= List of mergers in Nagasaki Prefecture =

Here is a list of mergers in Nagasaki Prefecture, Japan since the Heisei era.

== Mergers from April 1, 1999 to Present ==
- On March 1, 2004 - the towns of Izuhara, Mitsushima and Toyotama (all from Shimoagata District), and the towns of Kamiagata, Kamitsushima and Mine (all from Kamiagata District) were merged to create the city of Tsushima. Shimoagata District and Kamiagata District were dissolved as a result of this merger.
- On March 1, 2004 - the towns of Ashibe, Gonoura, Ishida and Katsumoto (all from Iki District) were merged to create the city of Iki. Iki District was dissolved as a result of this merger.
- On August 1, 2004 - the city of Fukue was merged with the towns of Kishiku, Miiraku, Naru, Tamanoura and Tomie (all from Minamimatsuura District) to create the city of Gotō.
- On August 1, 2004 - the towns of Arikawa, Kamigotō, Narao, Shin'uonome and Wakamatsu (all from Minamimatsuura District) were merged to create the town of Shinkamigotō.
- On January 4, 2005 - the towns of Iōjima, Kōyagi, Nomozaki, Sanwa, Sotome and Takashima (all from Nishisonogi District), were merged into the expanded city of Nagasaki.
- On March 1, 2005 - the old city of Isahaya absorbed the town of Tarami (from Nishisonogi District), and the towns of Iimori, Konagai, Moriyama and Takaki (all from Kitatakaki District) to create the new and expanded city of Isahaya. Kitatakaki District was dissolved as a result of this merger.
- On April 1, 2005 - the former town of Saikai absorbed the towns of Ōseto, Ōshima, Sakito and Seihi (all from Nishisonogi District) to create the city of Saikai.
- On April 1, 2005 - the towns of Sechibaru and Yoshii (both from Kitamatsuura District) were merged into the expanded city of Sasebo.
- On October 1, 2005 - the old city of Hirado absorbed the towns of Ikitsuki and Tabira, and the village of Ōshima (all from Kitamatsuura District) to create the new and expanded city of Hirado. With this merger, all villages in Nagasaki Prefecture have been dissolved.
- On October 11, 2005 - the towns of Aino, Azuma, Chijiwa, Kunimi, Minamikushiyama, Mizuho and Obama (all from Minamitakaki District) were merged to create the city of Unzen.
- On January 1, 2006 - the town of Ariake (from Minamitakaki District) was merged into the expanded city of Shimabara.
- On January 1, 2006 - the old city of Matsuura absorbed the towns of Fukushima and Takashima (both from Kitamatsuura District) to create the new and expanded city of Matsuura.
- On January 4, 2006 - the town of Kinkai (from Nishisonogi District) was merged into the expanded city of Nagasaki.
- On March 31, 2006 - the towns of Kosaza and Uku (both from Kitamatsuura District) were merged into the expanded city of Sasebo.
- On March 31, 2006 - the towns of Arie, Fukae, Futsu, Kazusa, Kitaarima, Kuchinotsu, Minamiarima and Nishiarie (all from Minamitakaki District) were merged to create the city of Minamishimabara. Minamitakaki District was dissolved as a result of this merger.
- On March 31, 2010 - the towns of Emukae and Shikamachi (both from Kitamatsuura District) was merged into the expanded city of Sasebo.
