= Japan National Route 57 =

National highway in Japan

National Route 57
- 国道57号

Route information
- Length: 326.7 km (203.0 mi)
- Existed: 1 April 1963–present
- History: Was Routes 214, 215 and 216 before 1963

Major junctions
- West end: National Route 34 in Nagasaki
- East end: National Route 10 in Ōita

Location
- Country: Japan

Highway system
- National highways of Japan; Expressways of Japan
← National Route 56	→ National Route 58

National Route 57 (国道57号, Kokudō Gojūnana-gō) is a national highway of Japan connecting Ōita and Nagasaki in Japan.

== Route description ==
- Length: 326.7 km (203.0 mi)
- Origin: Ōita, Ōita (junction with Route 10 and terminates at Route 210)
- Terminus: Nagasaki, Nagasaki (terminates at Route 34 and Route 202)
- Major cities: Oita, Taketa, Kumamoto, Uki, Shimabara, Isahaya, Nagasaki

A section of National Route 57 in the city of Taketa in Ōita Prefecture is a musical road.

== History ==
- 1953-05-18 - Second Class National Highway 214 (from Isahaya to Shimabara), Second Class National Highway 215 (from Shimabara to Uto) and Second Class National Highway 216 (from Kumamoto to Oita)
- 1963-04-01 - Joined Second Class National Highways 214, 215 and 216 to form First Class National Highway 57 (from Oita to Nagasaki)
- 1965-04-01 - General National Highway 57 (from Oita to Nagasaki)

== Overlapping sections ==
- From Oita (Omichi Entrance intersection) to Bungo-ono Inukai Bypass junction: Route 10
- From Oita (Funai Bridge North intersection) to Oita (Miyazaki intersection): Route 210
- From Taketa (Aiai-Shichiri intersection) to Taketa (Aiai-Hira intersection): Route 442
- From Aso Ichinomiya-machi Sakanashi (Sakanashi intersection) to Aso Kurokawa (Uchinomaki Onsen Entrance intersection): Route 265
- From Minamiaso (Aso Bridge intersection) to Ōzu (Muro intersection): Route 325
- From Minami-ku, Kumamoto (Chikami-machi intersection) to Uto (Matsuwara intersection): Route 3
- From Uki Misumi-machi Misumiura (Gokyō Entrance intersection) to Uki Misumi-machi Misumiura (Misumi Port intersection): Route 266
- From Shimabara Minato-machi (Shimabara Gaikō intersection) to Shimabara Shinwa-machi (Unzen Higashi Tozanguchi intersection): Route 251
- From Unzen Obama-cho Obama to Unzen Obama-cho Minamikisashi: Route 389
- From Unzen Obama-cho Marina (Unzen Nishi Tozanguchi intersection) to Unzen Aino-machi Otsu (Aino Tenbōdai-mae intersection): Route 251
- From Unzen Aino-machi (Aino intersection) to Isahaya: Route 251
- From Isahaya (Obunakoshi-machi intersection) to Isahaya Tarami-chō Geya (Kikitsu Station East Entrance intersection): Route 207
- From Isahaya (Obunakoshi Tunnel intersection) to Nagasaki (Kenchōmae intersection): Route 34
- From Nagasaki (Yagami-machi intersection) to Nagasaki (Kenchōmae intersection): Route 251

== Municipalities passed through ==
- Oita Prefecture
  - Oita - Bungo-ono - Taketa
- Kumamoto Prefecture
  - Aso - Minamiaso - Ōzu - Kikuyo - Kumamoto - Uto - Uki
- Nagasaki Prefecture
  - Shimabara - Minamishimabara - Unzen - Isahaya - Nagasaki
