= Kanzarashi =

Japanese dessert

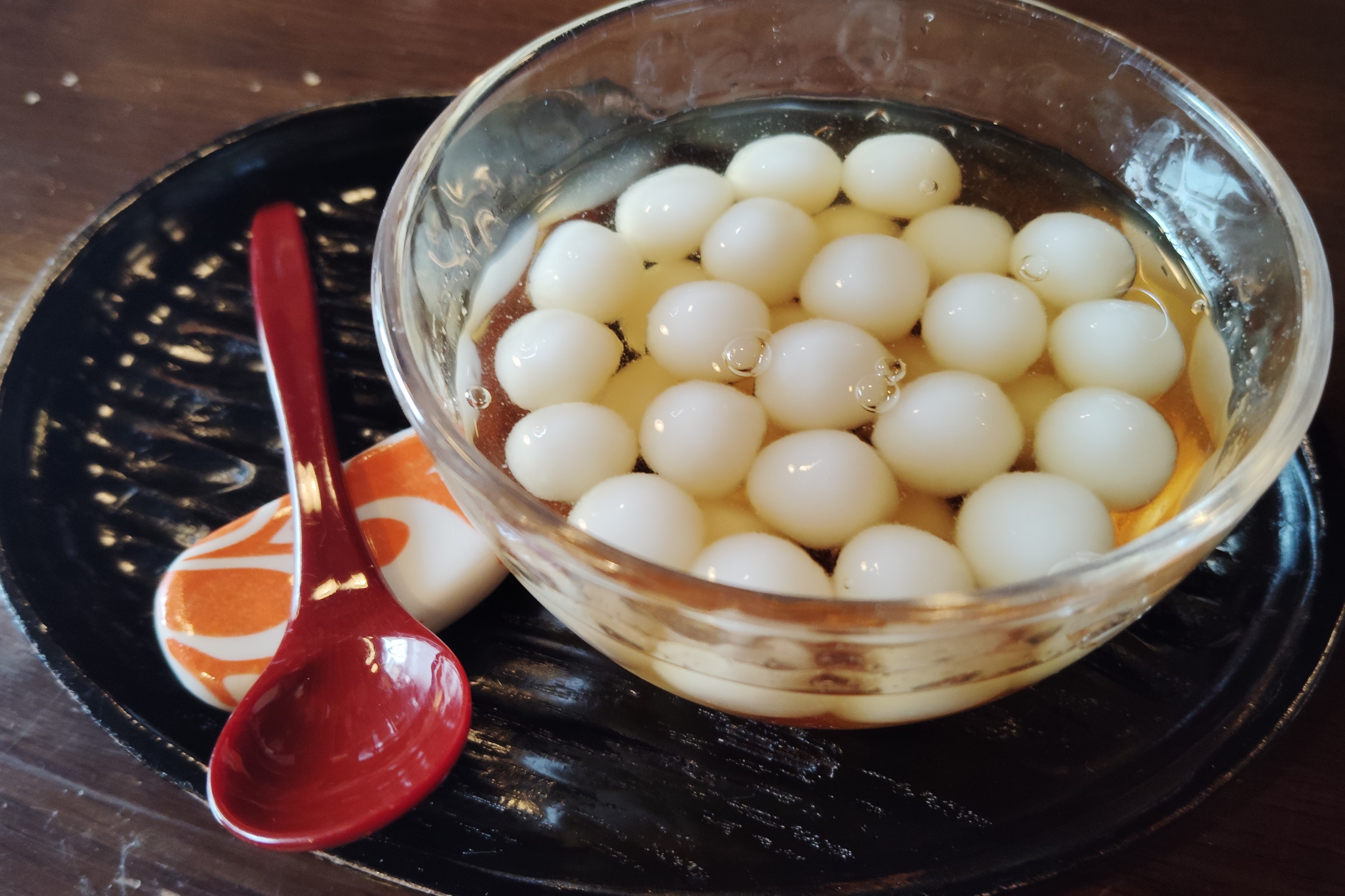
- Kanzarashi
- Alternative names: 寒ざらし, かんざらし
- Course: Dessert / Sweet
- Place of origin: Japan
- Region or state: Shimabara Peninsula, Nagasaki Prefecture
- Serving temperature: Cold (often chilled in spring water)
- Main ingredients: Glutinous rice flour (shiratamako), water, sugar or honey syrup

Kanzarashi (寒ざらし, かんざらし) is a traditional Japanese chilled sweet from the Shimabara Peninsula (centered around Shimabara City) in Nagasaki Prefecture. It consists of small dumplings made from glutinous-rice flour (shiratamako), cooled in natural spring water, and served with a syrup made from sugar or honey.

== History and origin ==
The origin of Kanzarashi is tied to the socioeconomic and environmental conditions historically present in Shimabara. In earlier times, many ordinary households were unable to consume whole rice because the bulk of the harvest was surrendered as tax. Instead, they subsisted on broken or surplus rice. This rice was milled into flour (traditionally shiratamako), which offered greater longevity and ease of storage.

However, rice-flour deteriorated quickly during the region's hot summers. As a preservation strategy, residents began forming small dumplings from the rice flour, cooking them, and then immersing them in cold spring water, where the cool, potable groundwater slowed spoilage and allowed storage.

According to local accounts, following the 1792 seismic events (the Shimabara–Unzen earthquake and associated landslide/tsunami), crustal deformation led to new underground fissures from which clear, cool water began to flow from dozens of sources. This created a reliable supply of spring water. Locals leveraged this resource for cooling and preservation.

Concurrently, Shimabara was known for its sugar production, making sugar (or honey) accessible, albeit originally a luxury. Gradually, the rice-flour dumplings preserved in spring water began to be served sweetened with syrup. Over time, Kanzarashi shifted from a subsistence-based foodstuff to a seasonal summer treat, used for hospitality and refreshment.

== Preparation and serving ==
To prepare Kanzarashi, glutinous-rice flour (traditionally shiratamako or equivalent) is first combined with water and kneaded until the dough becomes soft and pliable. Small pieces of dough are shaped into bite-sized dumplings and then boiled in water until they float. Once cooked, the dumplings are transferred immediately into cold water which cools them rapidly and firms their texture. After cooling, the dumplings are served chilled in a bowl and topped with a light syrup made from sugar or honey, sometimes with a subtle addition of salt or light soy sauce depending on the recipe. Because the dumplings themselves are relatively mild in flavor, the character of Kanzarashi depends largely on the syrup used. As a result, different households or shops may produce considerable variation in sweetness, aroma, and overall taste.

== Cultural and regional significance ==
Today, many shops in Shimabara continue to serve Kanzarashi, and some even offer hands-on “making experience” for tourists, allowing visitors to make the dish.

== Variations ==
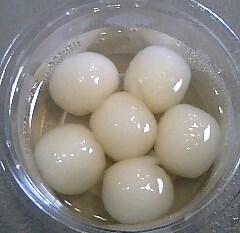
Kanzarashi

Although the basic ingredients of Kanzarashi remain the same, the final taste and presentation may vary considerably. The syrup used to sweeten it can vary. Some recipes employ plain sugar syrup, others use honey, and some add a subtle touch of salt or light soy sauce, resulting in distinct flavor nuances. In modern cafés and shops, serving styles can differ.
