= Nagasaki Prefecture =

Prefecture of Japan

Nagasaki Prefecture 長崎県
- Prefecture

Japanese transcription(s)
  - Japanese: 長崎県
  - Rōmaji: Nagasaki-ken
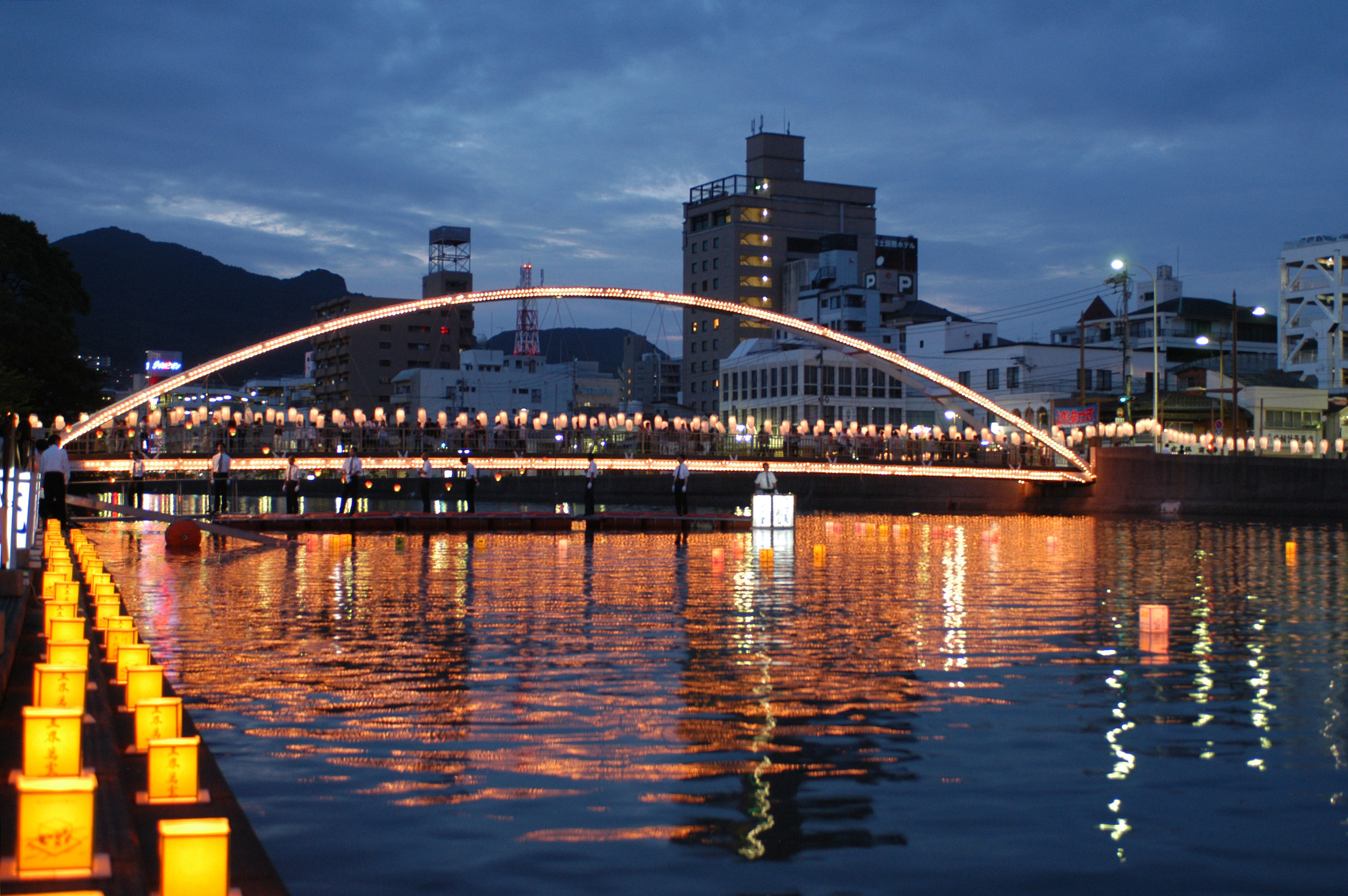
- Obon Festival with tōrō nagashi lantern release on the Albuquerque Bridge over the Sasebo River, Sasebo City, Nagasaki Prefecture

- Flag Symbol
- Anthem: Minami no kaze
- Coordinates: 32°45′00″N 129°52′03″E
- Country: Japan
- Region: Kyushu
- Island: Kyushu
- Capital: Nagasaki
- Subdivisions: Districts: 4, Municipalities: 21

Government
  - Governor: Ken Hirata since 2 March 2026

Area
  - Total: 4,130.88 km^{2} (1,594.94 sq mi)
  - Rank: 27th

Population (February 1, 2025)
  - Total: 1,246,481
  - Rank: 30th
  - Density: 302/km^{2} (780/sq mi)
  - Dialects: Nagasaki・Tsushima

GDP
  - Total: JP¥4,654 billion US$34.4 billion (2022)
- ISO 3166 code: JP-42
- Website: www.pref.nagasaki.jp/en
- Symbols of Japan
- Bird: Mandarin duck (Aix galericulata)
- Flower: Unzentsutsuji (Rhododendron serpyllifolium)
- Tree: Sawara (Chamaecyparis pisifera)

Nagasaki Prefecture (長崎県, Nagasaki-ken (Note: Japanese pronunciation: [nä̀.ɡä́.sä̀.k̟ʲì, -sä́.kʲi̥.kè̞ɴ̀, -ŋä́-])) is a prefecture of Japan, mainly located on the island of Kyūshū, although it also includes a number of islands off Kyūshū's northwest coast - including Tsushima and Iki. Nagasaki Prefecture has a population of 1,246,481 (1 February 2025) and has a geographic area of 4,130 km^{2} (1,594 sq mi). Nagasaki Prefecture borders Saga Prefecture to the northeast.

Nagasaki is the capital and largest city of Nagasaki Prefecture, with other major cities including Sasebo, Isahaya, and Ōmura. Nagasaki Prefecture is located in western Kyūshū with a territory consisting of many mainland peninsulas centered around Ōmura Bay, as well as islands and archipelagos including Tsushima and Iki in the Korea Strait and the Gotō Islands in the East China Sea. Nagasaki Prefecture is known for its century-long trading history with the Europeans and as the sole place of direct trade and exchange between Japan and the outside world during the Sakoku period. Nagasaki Prefecture is home to several of the Hidden Christian Sites in the Nagasaki Region which have been declared a UNESCO World Heritage Site.

== History ==
Nagasaki Prefecture was created by merging of the western half of the former province of Hizen with the island provinces of Tsushima and Iki. Facing China and Korea, the region around Hirado was a traditional center for traders and pirates.

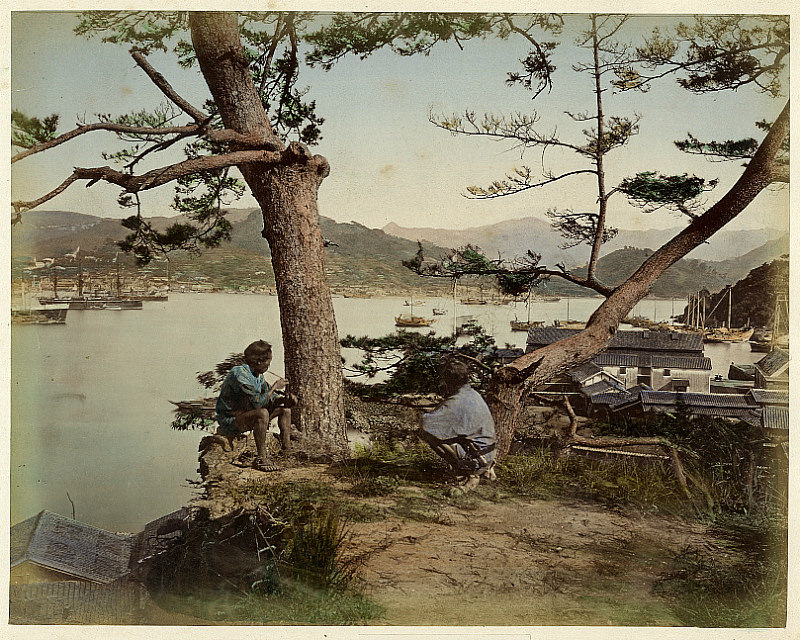
Kuichi Uchida's image of Nagasaki in 1872

During the 16th century, Catholic missionaries and traders from Portugal arrived and became active in Hirado and Nagasaki, which became a major center for foreign trade. After being given free rein in Oda Nobunaga's period, the missionaries were forced out little by little, until finally, in the Tokugawa era, Christianity was banned under the Sakoku national isolation policy: Japanese foreign trade was restricted to Chinese and Dutch traders based at Dejima in Nagasaki. However, Kirishitan (Japanese Christian) worship continued underground. These Kakure Kirishitan (hidden Christians) were tried at every step, forced to step on fumi-e ("trample pictures", images of the Virgin Mary and saints) to prove that they were non-Christian. With the banishment of all Catholic missionaries, traders from Catholic countries were also forced out of the country. Along with them, their children, half Japanese and half European, were forced to leave. The majority was sent to Jagatara (Jakarta) and are still remembered by the locals as the people who wrote the poignant letters which were smuggled across the sea to their homeland.

Today, Nagasaki has prominent Catholic churches, and the Hidden Christian Sites in the Nagasaki Region, have been included on the UNESCO World Heritage List.

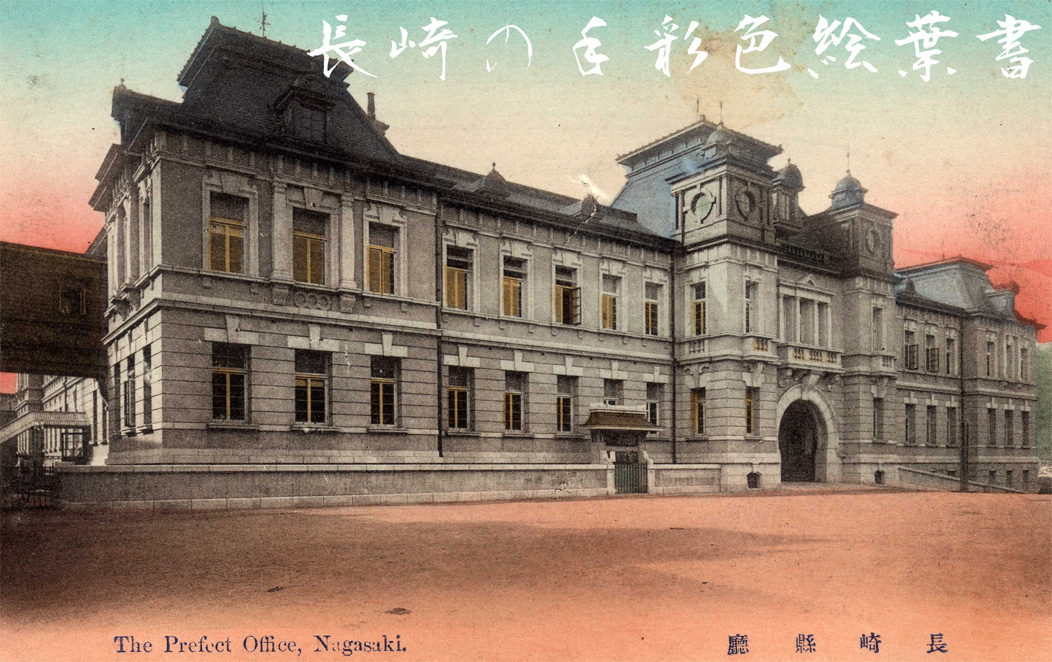
Nagasaki Prefect Office, Meiji Period

During the Meiji Restoration, Nagasaki and Sasebo became major ports for foreign trade, and eventually major military bases and shipbuilding centers for the Imperial Japanese Navy and the Mitsubishi Heavy Industries up to World War II. On August 9, 1945, the United States dropped an atomic bomb on Nagasaki, which destroyed all buildings in a 1.6-kilometre (1.0 mi) radius from the point of impact and extensively damaged other parts of the city. Roughly 39,000 people were killed, including 27,778 Japanese munitions workers, 2,000 Korean forced workers, and 150 Japanese soldiers. About 68–80% of the industrial production was destroyed to the point it would not recover for months or at least a year.

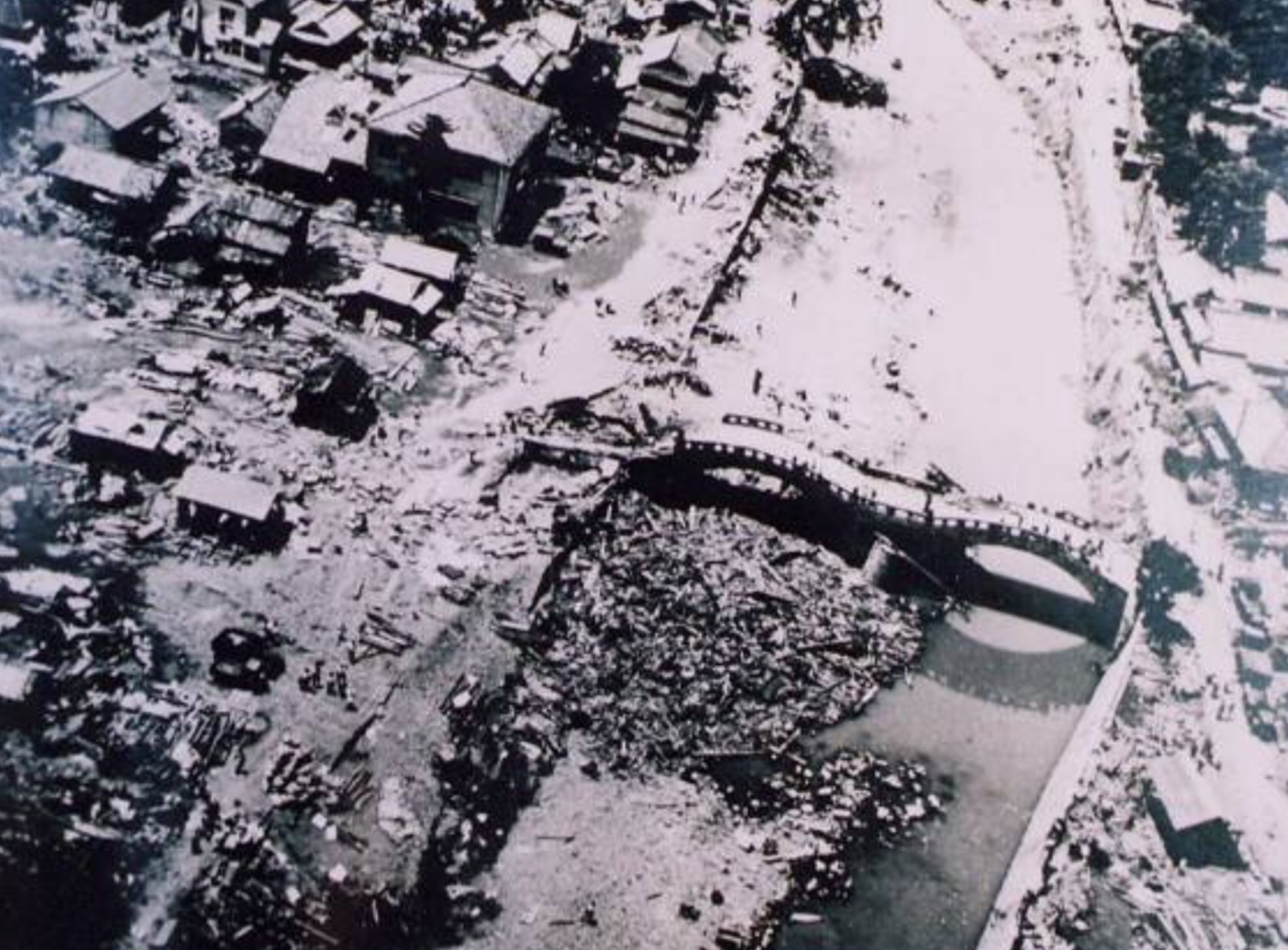
An overview of 1957 Isahaya floods

Nagasaki Prefecture contains many areas prone to heavy rain and subsequent landslide damage. In July 1957, mainly in the Isahaya area, damage from heavy rains, flooding and landslides lead to a death toll of 586, with 136 people missing and 3,860 injured. In July 1982, typhoon damage in the Nagasaki area lead to 299 fatalities, according to a report by the Japanese government.

== Geography ==
Nagasaki borders Saga Prefecture on the east, and is otherwise surrounded by water, including Ariake Bay, the Tsushima Straits (far from Busan and South Gyeongsang Province, South Korea), and the East China Sea. It also includes a large number of islands such as Tsushima, Iki and Goto. Most of the prefecture is near the coast and there are a number of ports such as Nagasaki and a United States Navy base at Sasebo.

As of 1 April 2014, 18% of the total land area of the prefecture was designated as Natural Parks, namely the Saikai and Unzen-Amakusa National Parks; Genkai and Iki-Tsushima Quasi-National Parks; and Hokushō, Nishi Sonogi Hantō, Nomo Hantō, Ōmurawan, Shimabara Hantō, and Taradake Prefectural Natural Parks.

=== Cities ===
Map of Nagasaki Prefecture City Town

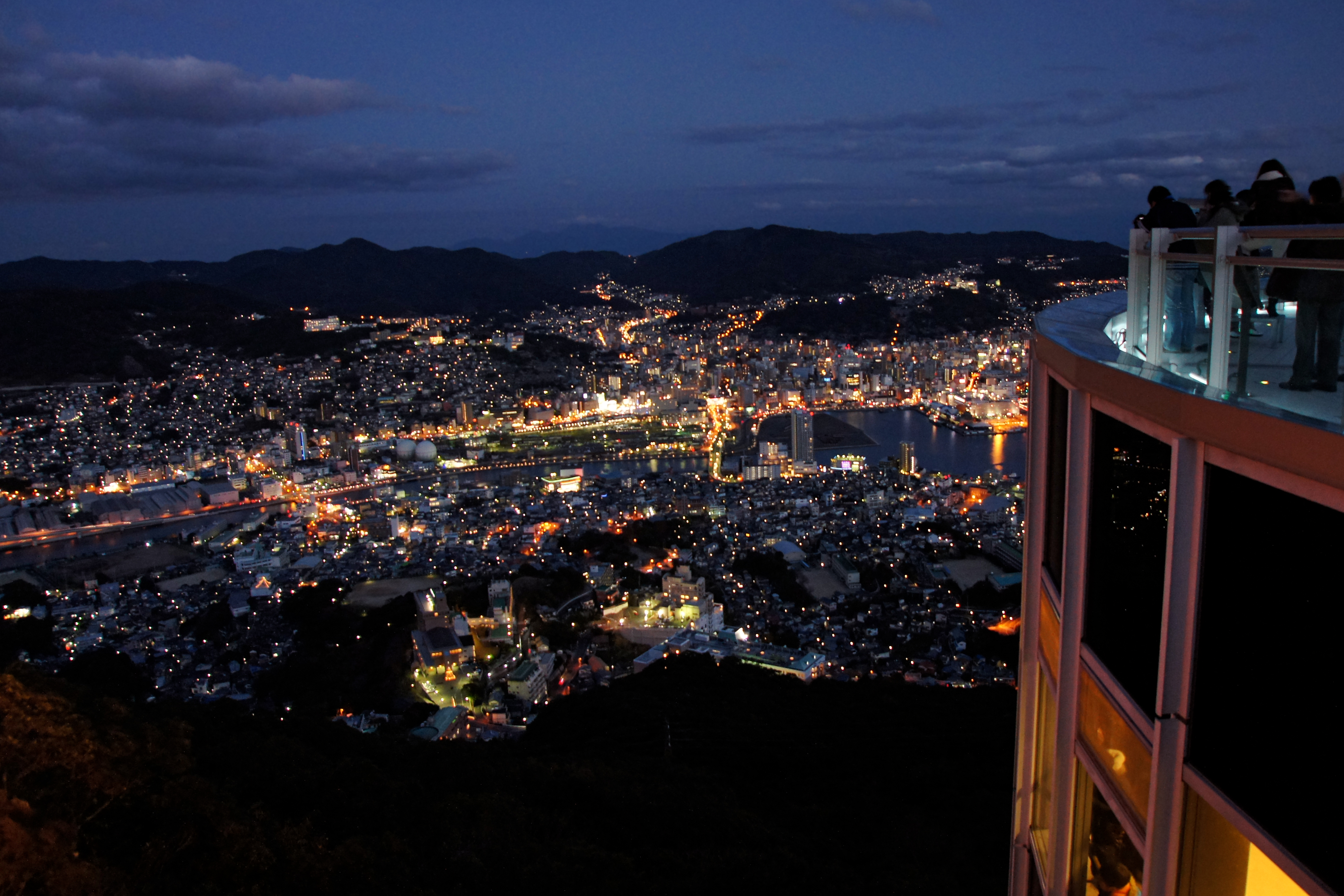
Night view of Nagasaki City

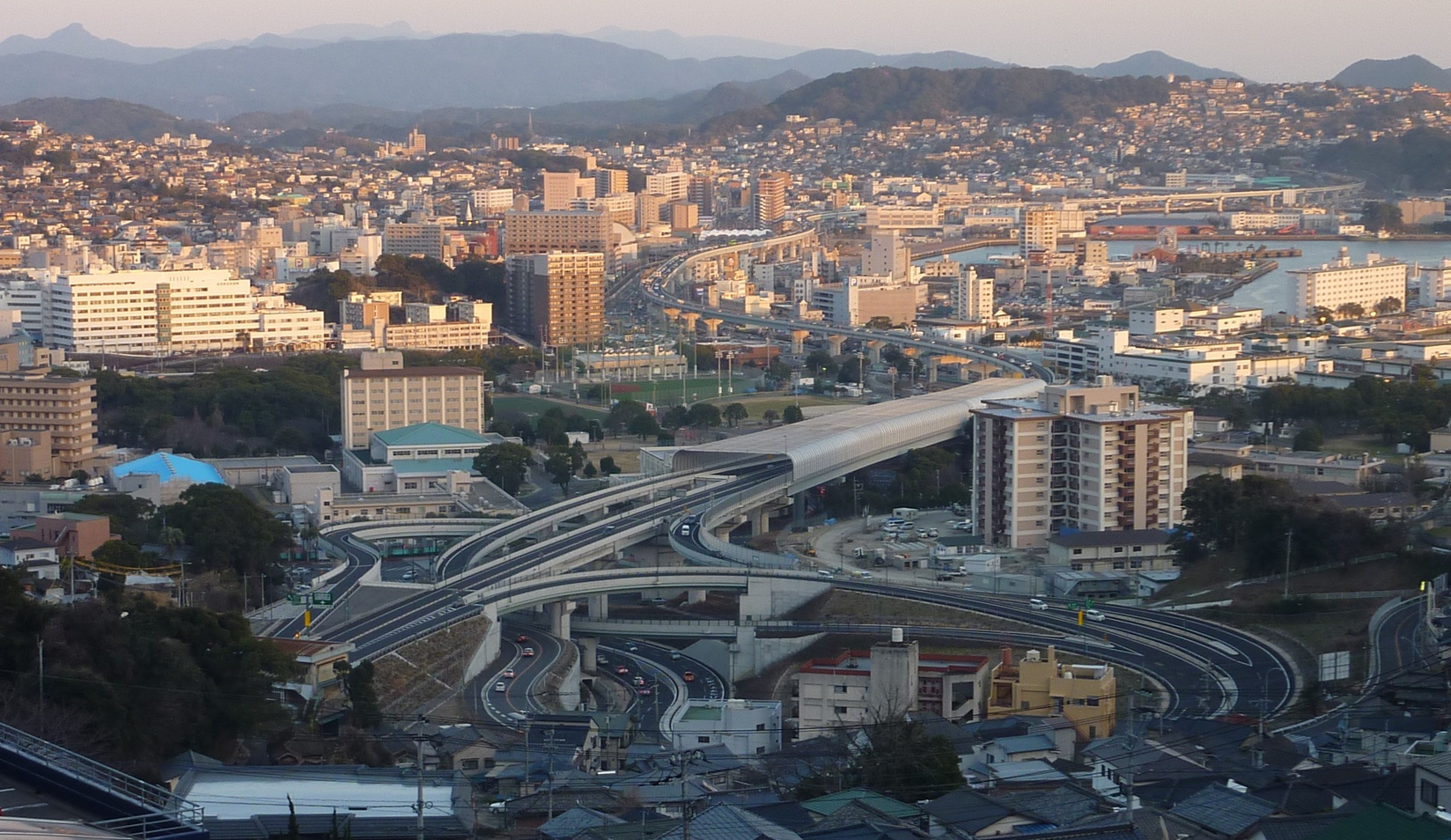
Sasebo

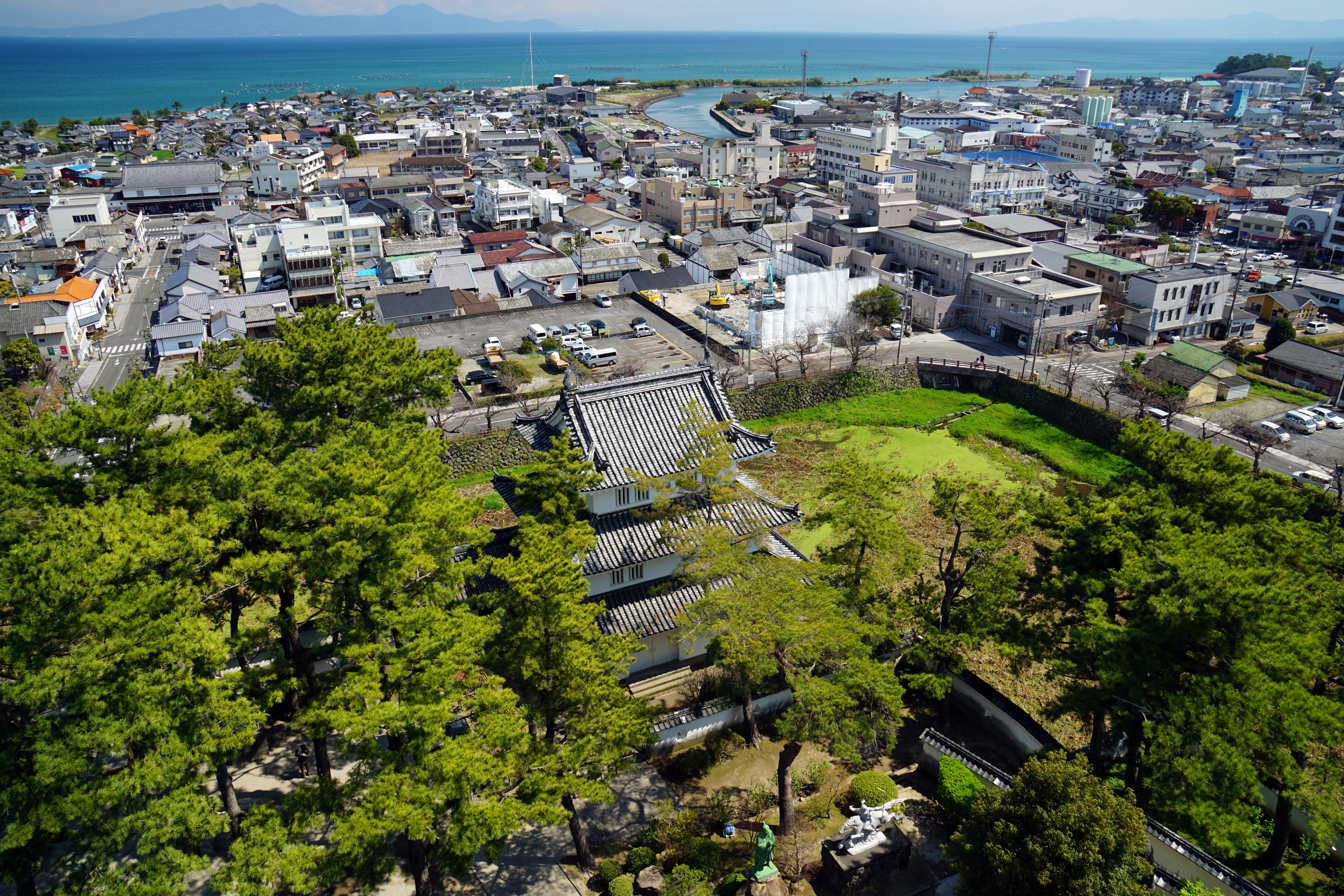
Shimabara

Thirteen cities are located in Nagasaki Prefecture:

Name		Area (km^{2})	Population	Map
Rōmaji	Kanji	Area (km^{2})	Population	Map
Gotō	五島市	420.81	37,775	
Hirado	平戸市	235.63	31,192	
Iki	壱岐市	138.57	28,008	
Isahaya	諫早市	341.79	135,546	
Matsuura	松浦市	130.37	23,566	
Minamishimabara	南島原市	169.89	45,465	
Nagasaki (capital)	長崎市	240.71	407,624	
Ōmura	大村市	126.34	95,146	
Saikai	西海市	242.01	28,815	
Sasebo	佐世保市	426.06	247,739	
Shimabara	島原市	82.77	44,936	
Tsushima	対馬市	708.61	31,550	
Unzen	雲仙市	206.92	42,457	

=== Districts ===
These are the towns and villages of each district:

Name		Area (km^{2})	Population	District	Type	Map
Rōmaji	Kanji	Area (km^{2})	Population	District	Type	Map
Hasami	波佐見町	56	14,940	Higashisonogi District	Town	
Higashisonogi	東彼杵町	74.29	8,175	Higashisonogi District	Town	
Kawatana	川棚町	74.25	9,219	Higashisonogi District	Town	
Nagayo	長与町	28.81	42,570	Nishisonogi District	Town	
Ojika	小値賀町	25.46	2,588	Kitamatsuura District	Town	
Saza	佐々町	32.3	13,825	Kitamatsuura District	Town	
Shin-Kamigotō	新上五島町	213.98	19,886	Minami-Matsuura District	Town	
Togitsu	時津町	20.73	30,084	Nishisonogi District	Town	

=== Mergers ===
The following municipalities have been dissolved since the year 2000.

- Kitamatsuura District:
  - Emukae, Fukushima, Ikitsuki, Kosaza, Ōshima, Sechibaru, Shikamachi, Tabira, Takashima, Uku, Yoshii
- Minamimatsuura District:
  - Arikawa, Kamigotō, Kishiku, Miiraku, Narao, Naru, Shin'uonome, Tamanoura, Tomie, Wakamatsu
- Nishisonogi District:
  - Iōjima, Kinkai, Kōyagi, Nomozaki, Ōseto, Ōshima, Saikai, Sakito, Sanwa, Seihi, Sotome, Takashima, Tarami
- Kitatakaki District:
  - Iimori, Konagai, Moriyama, Takaki
- Minamitakaki District:
  - Aino, Ariake, Arie, Azuma, Chidiwa, Fukae, Futsu, Kazusa, Kitaarima, Kuchinotsu, Kunimi, Minamiarima, Minamikushiyama, Mizuho, Nishiarie, Obama
- Kamiagata District:
  - Kamiagata, Kamitsushima, Mine
- Shimoagata District:
  - Izuhara, Mitsushima, Toyotama
- Iki District:
  - Ashibe, Gonoura, Ishida, Katsumoto

== Culture ==
=== Religion ===
Religious denominations in the Nagasaki Prefecture (1996)
1. Pure Land Buddhism (19.5%)
2. Zen Buddhism (3.60%)
3. Tendai or Shingon Buddhism (4.90%)
4. Soka Gakkai (3.00%)
5. Nichiren Buddhism (5.10%)
6. Other Buddhist schools (3.00%)
7. Christianity (5.10%)
8. Shinto sects (2.00%)
9. Folk Shinto or no religion (53.8%)

Nagasaki is the most Christianized area in Japan with Roman Catholic missions having been established there as early as the 16th century. Shusaku Endo's novel Silence draws from the oral history of the local Christian (Kirishitan) communities, both Kakure Kirishitan and Hanare Kirishitan.

As of 2002, there are 68,617 Catholics in Nagasaki Prefecture, accounting for 4.52 percent of the population of the prefecture.

=== Sports ===
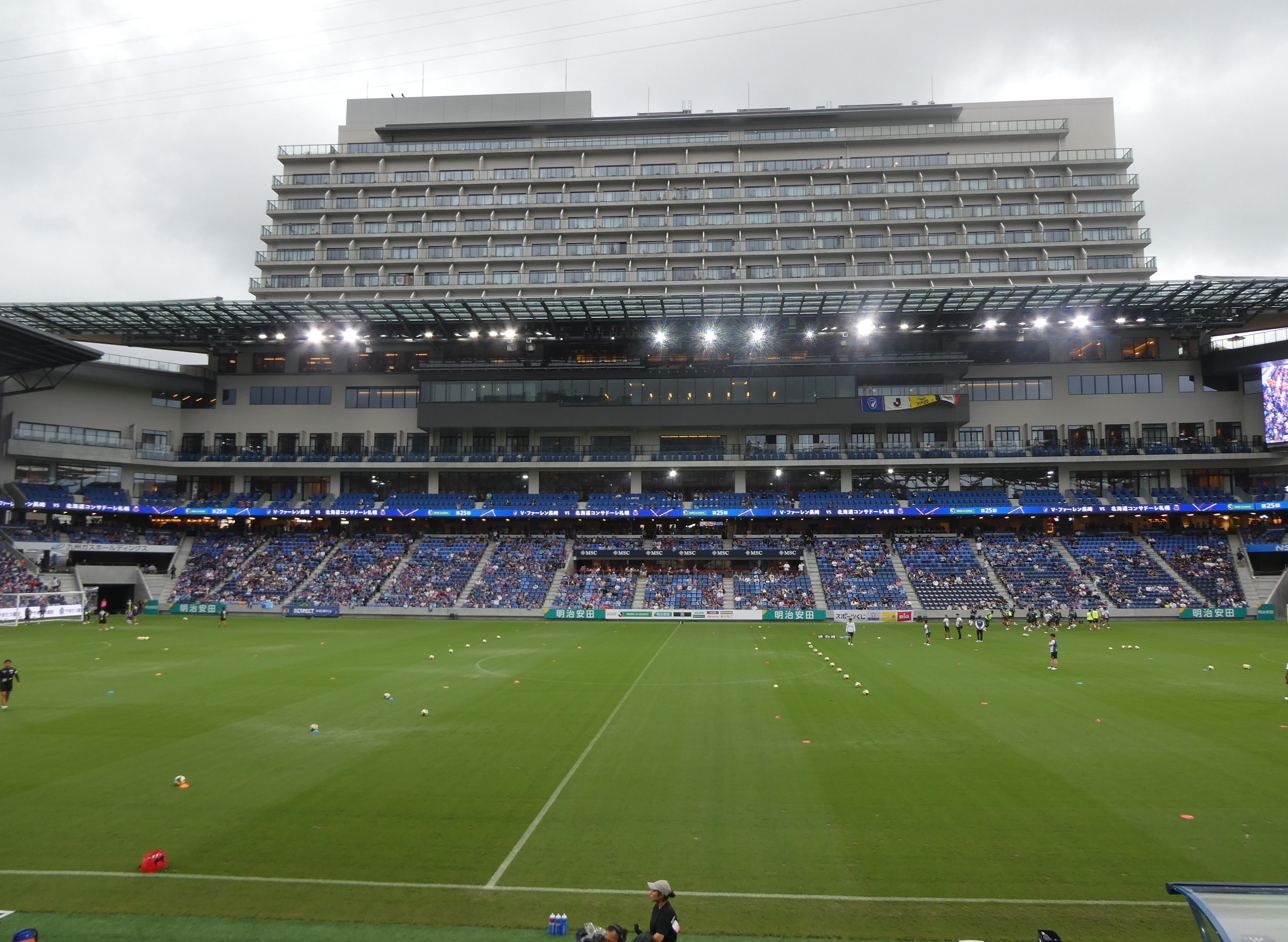
Nagasaki Peace Football Stadium in Nagasaki City.

The city has one football team, V-Varen Nagasaki, which plays in the J2 League.

The Nagasaki Saints of the former Shikoku-Kyūshū Island League made Nagasaki Prefecture their home prior to their dissolving.

== Visitor attractions ==
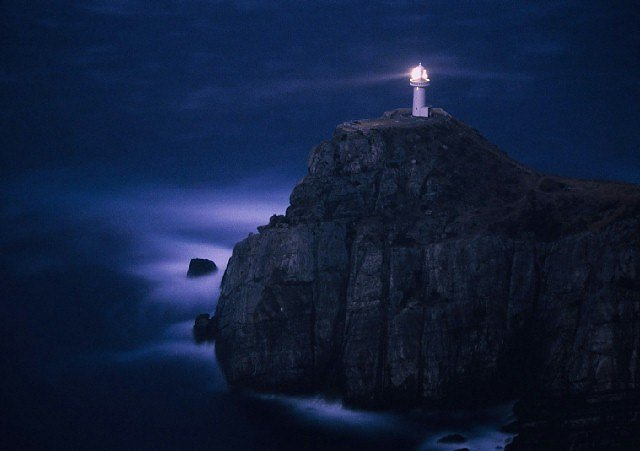
View of Osezaki Lighthouse on Fukue Island

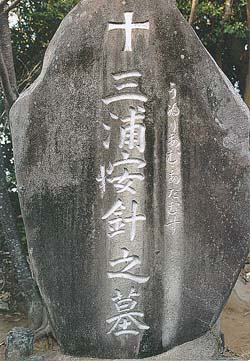
Grave of William Adams in Hirado inscribed with his Japanese title Miura Anjin (三浦按針)

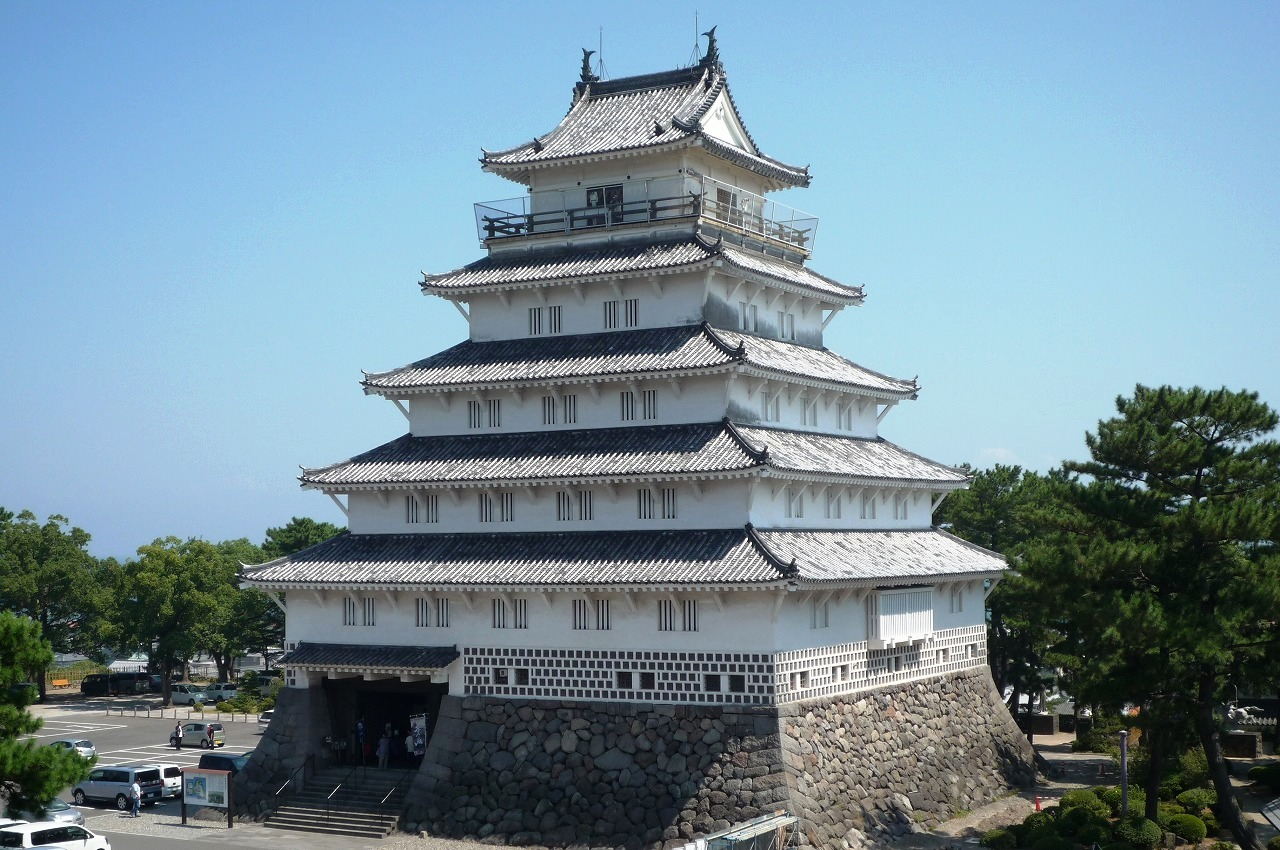
Shimabara Castle

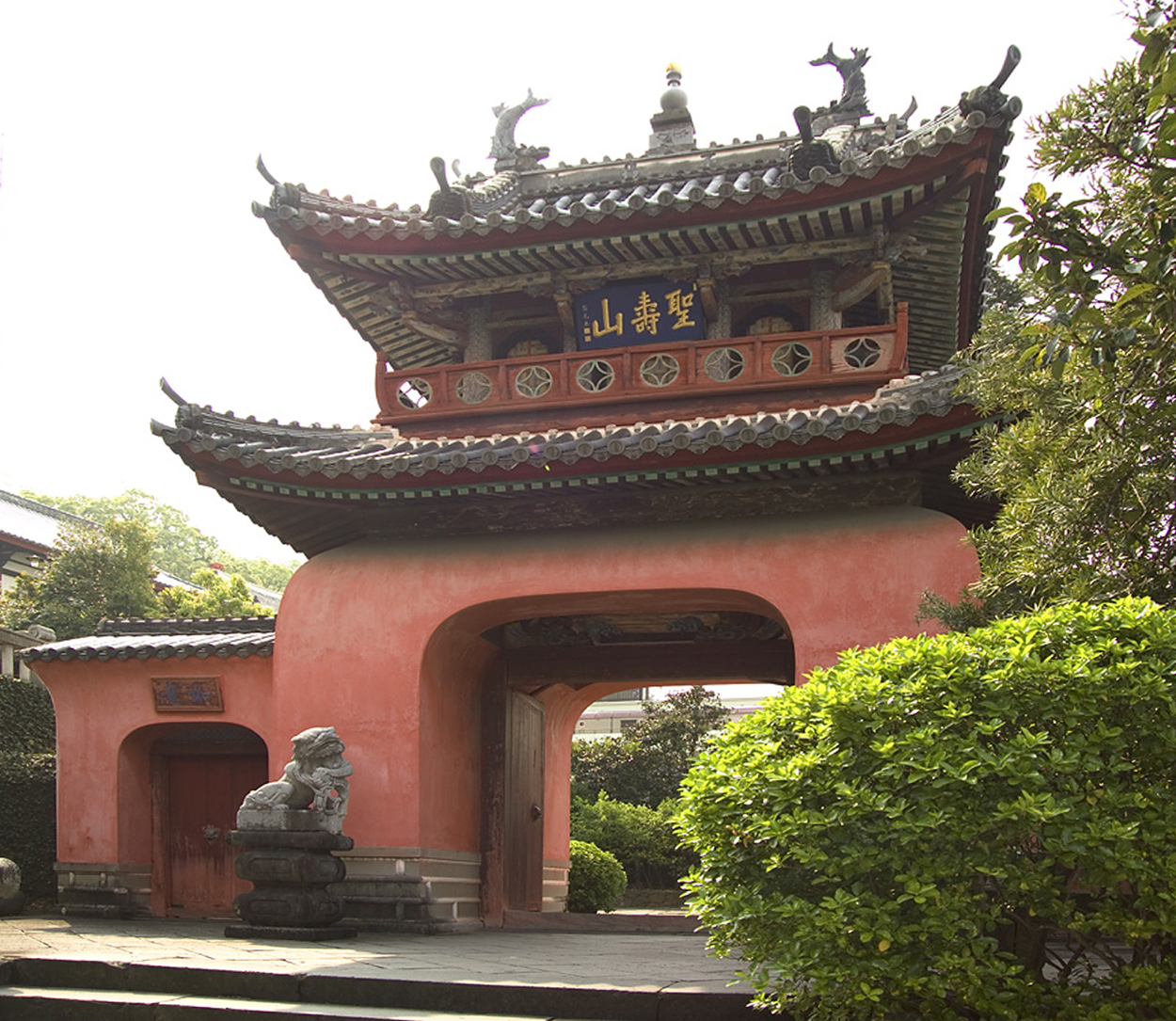
Sōfuku-ji Ōbaku Zen temple in Nagasaki

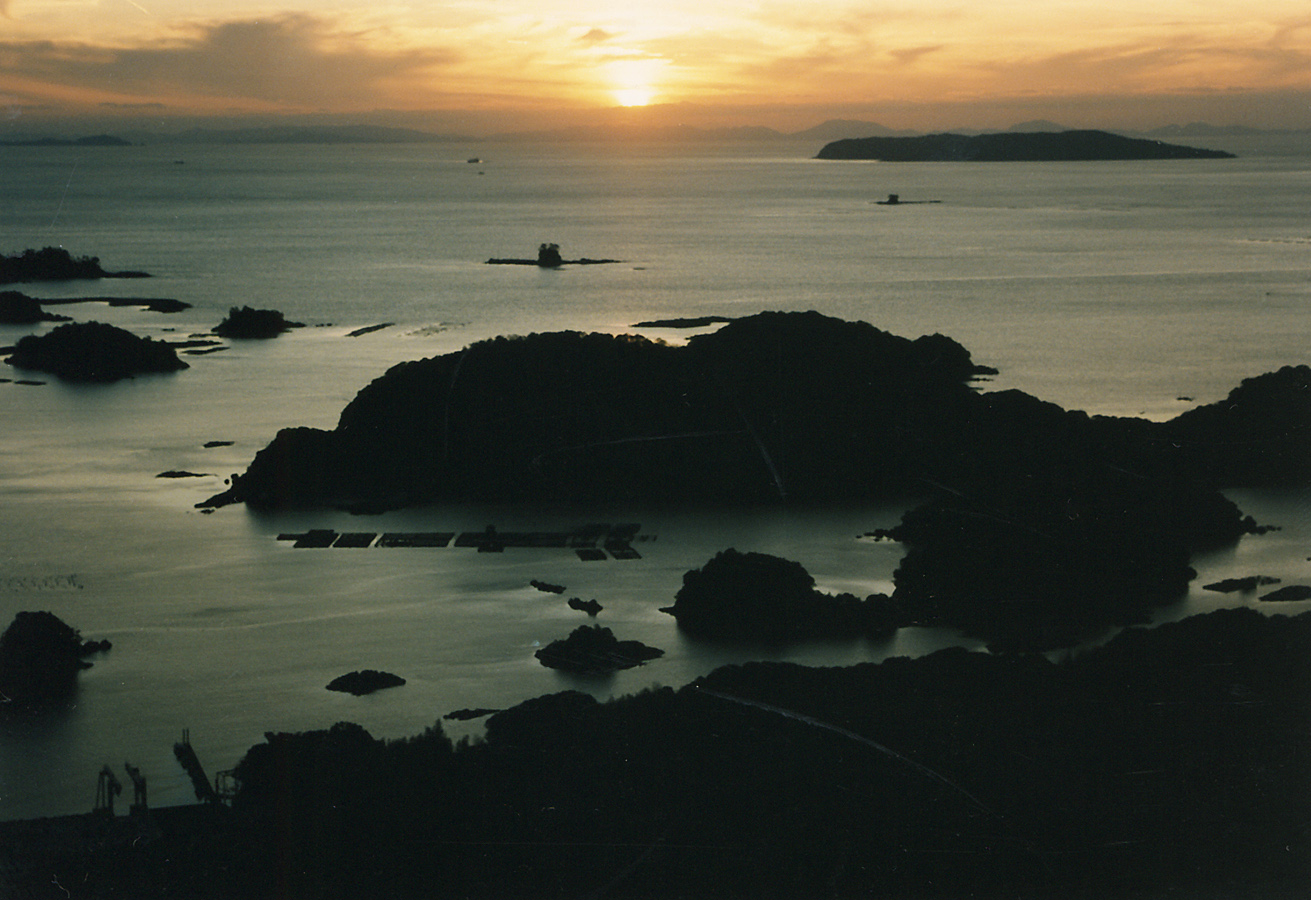
Kujūku Islands in Sasebo

- Nagasaki (capital city)
  - Confucius Shrine, Nagasaki
  - Glover Garden
  - Hashima Island
  - Kofukuji
  - Mount Inasa
  - Nagasaki Shinchi Chinatown
  - Ōura Church
  - Sōfuku-ji
  - Suwa Shrine
  - Urakami Cathedral
- Hirado
  - Hirado Castle
  - Sakikata Park
- Sasebo
  - Huis Ten Bosch
  - Kujūku Islands
  - Tenkaihō Takayuki
- Saikai
  - Nagasaki Bio Park
- Shimabara Peninsula
  - Mount Unzen
  - Shimabara Castle

== Transportation ==
=== Rail ===
- JR Kyushu
  - Nagasaki Main Line
  - Nishi Kyushu Shinkansen
  - Omura Line
  - Sasebo Line
- Matsuura Railway
  - Nishi-Kyūshū Line
- Shimabara Railway

=== Tram ===
- Nagasaki Electric Tramway

=== Roads ===
==== Expressways and toll roads ====
- Kawahira Toll Road
- Kunimi Toll Road
- Nagasaki Dejima Road
- Nagasaki Expressway
- Nishi-Kyūshū Expressway

==== National highways ====
- Route 34
- Route 35
- Route 57
- Route 202
- Route 204
- Route 205
- Route 206
- Route 207
- Route 251
- Route 324
- Route 382
- Route 383
- Route 384
- Route 389
- Route 444
- Route 498
- Route 499

=== Ports ===
- Fukue Port
- Gonoura Port of Iki Island
- Hirado Port
- Izuhara Port of Tsushima
- Matsuura Port
- Nagasaki Port
- Sasebo Port
- Shimabara Port

=== Airports ===
- Iki Airport
- Fukue Airport
- Nagasaki Airport
- Tsushima Airport

== Politics ==
The current governor of Nagasaki is Ken Hirata who defeated incumbent Kengo Oishi in 2026. Oishi, a doctor, was 39 years old when he took office, and the youngest sitting prefectural governor in Japan. Hōdō Nakamura, a three-term governor, was first elected in 2010 to succeed Genjirō Kaneko and was previously a vice-governor.

The Nagasaki Prefectural Assembly has a regular membership of 46, elected in 16 electoral districts in unified regional elections (last round: 2011). As of April 2014, the LDP-led caucus has 23 members, the DPJ-SDP-led caucus 17.

In the National Diet, Nagasaki is represented by four directly elected members of the House of Representatives and two (one per ordinary election) of the House of Councillors. After the most recent national elections of 2010, 2012 and 2013, Nagasaki sends an all-LDP delegation to the Diet (excluding members who lost election in Nagasaki districts, but were elected to the proportional representation segment of the House of Representatives in the Kyūshū block).

== General references ==
- Nussbaum, Louis-Frédéric and Käthe Roth (2005). Japan Encyclopedia. Cambridge: Harvard University Press. ISBN 978-0-674-01753-5; OCLC 58053128
