= Minamishimabara =

Minamishimabara 南島原市
- City
- Minamishimabara
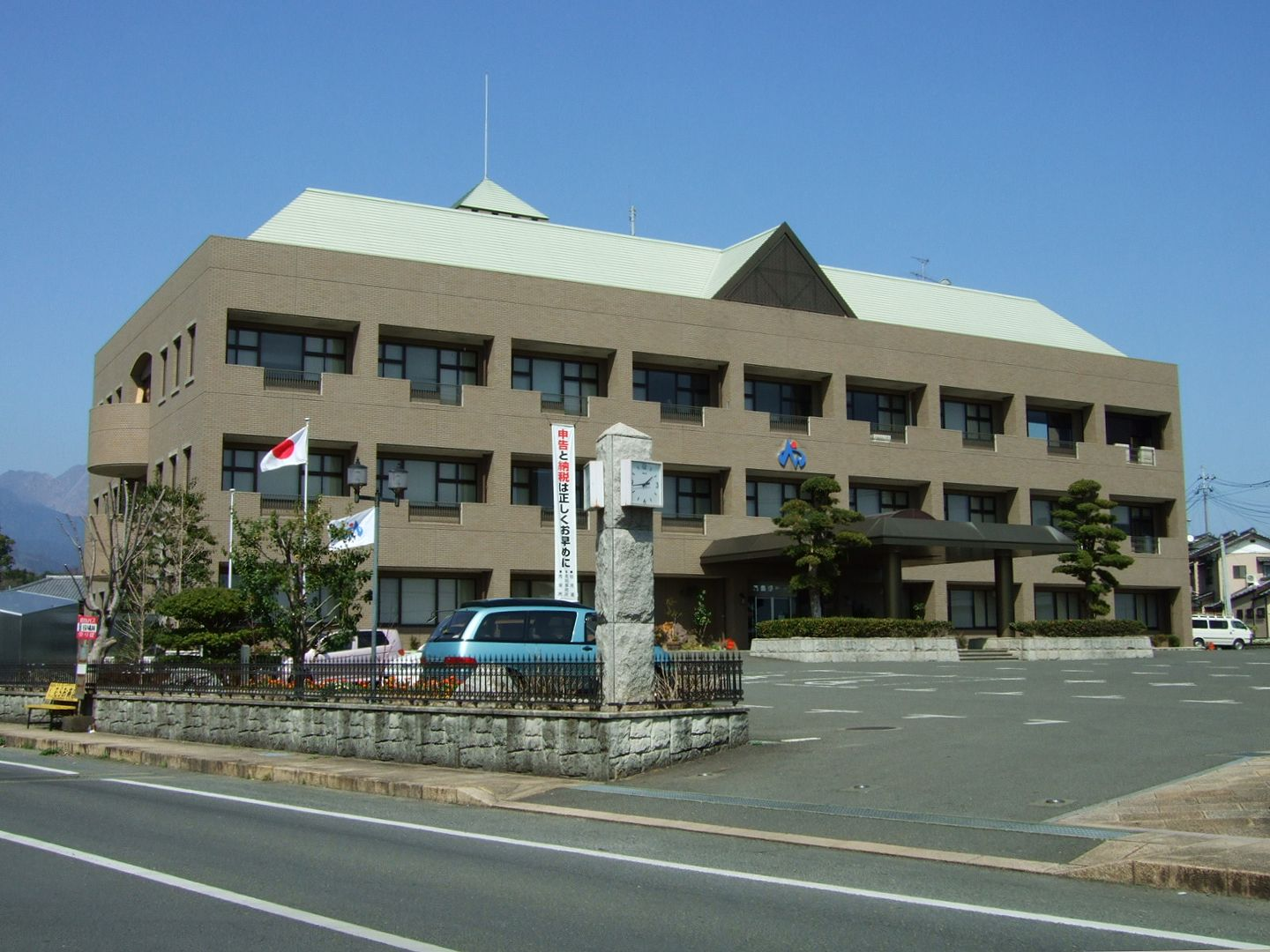
- Minamishimabara City Hall

- Flag Emblem
- Interactive map of Minamishimabara
- Location in Japan
- Coordinates: 32°39′35″N 130°17′52″E
- Country: Japan
- Region: Kyushu
- Prefecture: Nagasaki
- Eight towns merged and city settled: March 31, 2006

Government
  - Mayor: Taketoshi Aikawa（相川武利） - from June 2022

Area
  - Total: 170.13 km^{2} (65.69 sq mi)

Population (June 30, 2024)
  - Total: 41,028
  - Density: 241.16/km^{2} (624.59/sq mi)
- Time zone: UTC+09:00 (JST)
- City hall address: 96-2 Satobo, Nishiarie-cho, Minamishimabara City, Nagasaki-ken 859-2211
- Climate: Cfa
- Website: Official website
- Symbols
- Flower: Sunflower
- Tree: Ficus superba

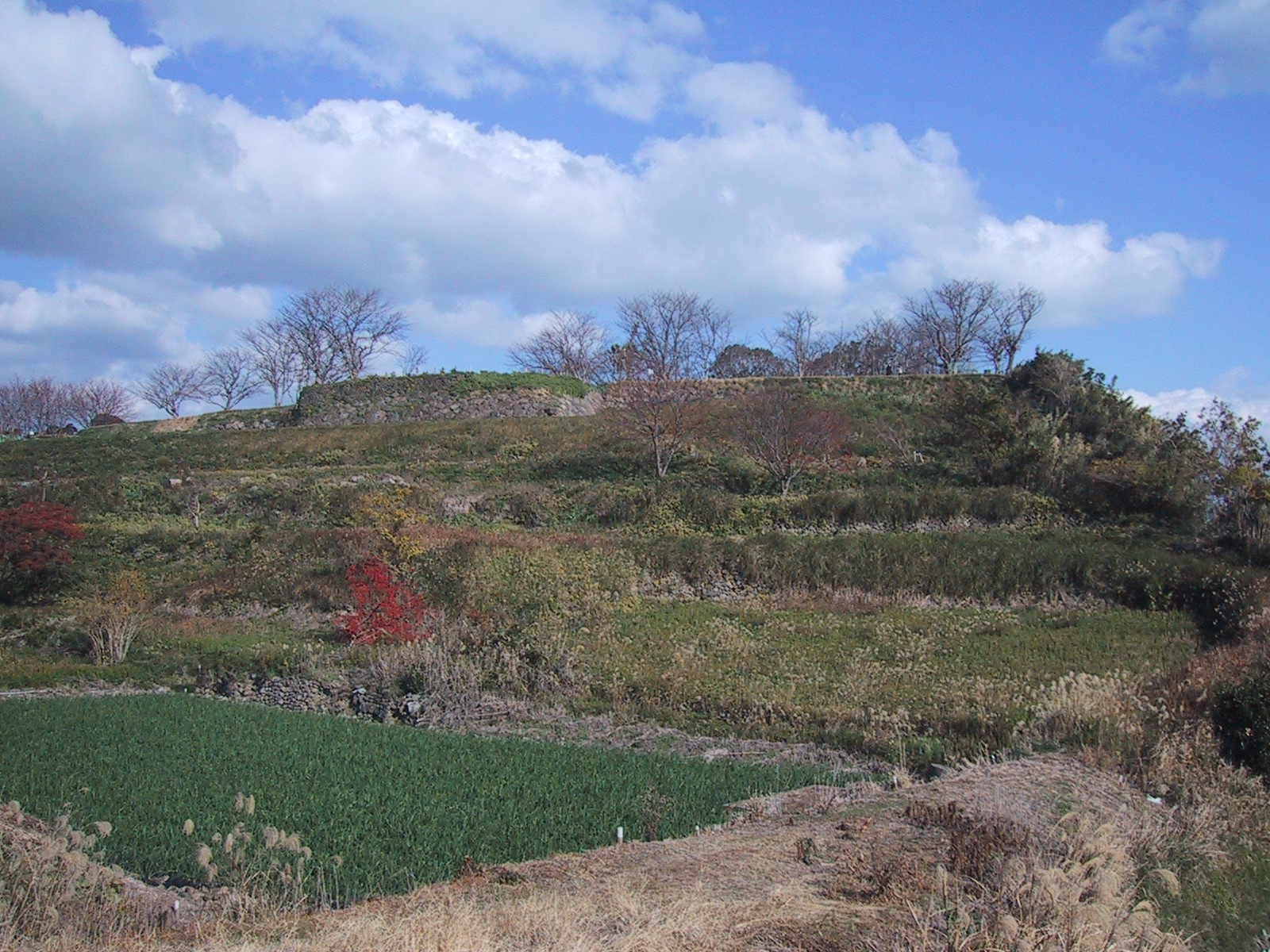
Ruins of Hara Castle

Minamishimabara (Japanese: 南島原市, Hepburn: Minami-Shimabara-shi) lit. "South Shimabara City" is a city in Nagasaki Prefecture, Japan. As of 30 June 2024, the city had an estimated population of 41,028 in 18378 households, and a population density of 240 people per km^{2}. The total area of the city is 170.13 km^{2} (65.69 sq mi).

== Geography ==
Minamishimabara is located about 60 km southeast of Nagasaki City (by land), and covers the area from the southeastern to southern tip of the Shimabara Peninsula. It borders Unzen City to the northwest and Shimabara City to the northeast. The western part of the city faces the Amakusa Sea, and the eastern and southern parts face the Ariake Sea (Shimabara Bay), and the urban areas are concentrated in this area. The northern part of the city limits is in the center of the Shimabara Peninsula, and is a mountainous area that constitutes a part of Mount Unzen.

=== Neighbouring municipalities ===
Nagasaki

- Shimabara
- Unzen

=== Climate ===
Minamishimabara has a humid subtropical climate (Köppen:Cfa) with hot summers and cool winters. The average annual temperature in Minamishimabara is 17.3 °C (63.1 °F). The average annual rainfall is 1,813.9 mm (71.41 in) with June as the wettest month. The temperatures are highest on average in August, at around 27.9 °C (82.2 °F), and lowest in January, at around 7.2 °C (45.0 °F). Its record high is 38.8 °C (101.8 °F), reached on 7 August 2009, and its record low is −6.2 °C (20.8 °F), reached on 25 January 2016.

Climate data for Kuchinotsu, Minamishimabara (1991−2020 normals, extremes 1976−present)
Month	Jan	Feb	Mar	Apr	May	Jun	Jul	Aug	Sep	Oct	Nov	Dec	Year
Record high °C (°F)	21.0 (69.8)	21.8 (71.2)	24.7 (76.5)	28.2 (82.8)	31.4 (88.5)	36.9 (98.4)	37.0 (98.6)	38.8 (101.8)	37.8 (100.0)	32.8 (91.0)	26.4 (79.5)	24.4 (75.9)	38.8 (101.8)
Mean daily maximum °C (°F)	10.9 (51.6)	12.2 (54.0)	15.5 (59.9)	20.1 (68.2)	24.2 (75.6)	26.9 (80.4)	30.7 (87.3)	32.3 (90.1)	29.3 (84.7)	24.5 (76.1)	18.8 (65.8)	13.3 (55.9)	21.6 (70.8)
Daily mean °C (°F)	7.2 (45.0)	8.0 (46.4)	11.1 (52.0)	15.4 (59.7)	19.5 (67.1)	22.9 (73.2)	26.8 (80.2)	27.9 (82.2)	24.9 (76.8)	19.8 (67.6)	14.4 (57.9)	9.3 (48.7)	17.3 (63.1)
Mean daily minimum °C (°F)	3.2 (37.8)	3.7 (38.7)	6.6 (43.9)	10.9 (51.6)	15.4 (59.7)	19.8 (67.6)	23.9 (75.0)	24.6 (76.3)	21.3 (70.3)	15.7 (60.3)	10.3 (50.5)	5.2 (41.4)	13.4 (56.1)
Record low °C (°F)	−6.2 (20.8)	−5.2 (22.6)	−3.1 (26.4)	0.6 (33.1)	7.8 (46.0)	12.1 (53.8)	17.4 (63.3)	18.5 (65.3)	11.8 (53.2)	5.1 (41.2)	0.7 (33.3)	−3.0 (26.6)	−6.2 (20.8)
Average precipitation mm (inches)	60.9 (2.40)	79.0 (3.11)	114.8 (4.52)	132.6 (5.22)	151.6 (5.97)	366.9 (14.44)	304.6 (11.99)	180.7 (7.11)	175.1 (6.89)	88.8 (3.50)	89.6 (3.53)	69.3 (2.73)	1,813.9 (71.41)
Average precipitation days (≥ 1.0 mm)	7.7	8.4	10.3	9.7	9.1	14.0	10.4	9.1	9.1	6.7	8.4	7.8	110.7
Mean monthly sunshine hours	133.4	147.8	178.9	191.5	199.4	134.5	195.2	232.7	188.9	194.2	157.7	142.5	2,099.6
Source: Japan Meteorological Agency

== Demographics ==
Per Japanese census data, the population of Minamishimabara in 2020 is 42,330 people. Minamishimabara has been conducting censuses since 1920. Minamishimabara's population peaked in 1945 and has since declined; the city's population in 2020 is only 50% of its 1945 population.

Historical population

Year	Pop.	±%
1920	67,412	—
1925	67,300	−0.2%
1930	69,473	+3.2%
1935	69,807	+0.5%
1940	68,034	−2.5%
1945	91,255	+34.1%
1950	88,327	−3.2%
1955	83,931	−5.0%
1960	79,549	−5.2%
1965	74,734	−6.1%
1970	69,861	−6.5%

Year	Pop.	±%
1975	67,759	−3.0%
1980	66,556	−1.8%
1985	65,575	−1.5%
1990	62,828	−4.2%
1995	58,898	−6.3%
2000	57,045	−3.1%
2005	54,045	−5.3%
2010	50,377	−6.8%
2015	46,535	−7.6%
2020	42,330	−9.0%

Minamishimabara population statistics

== History ==
The area of Minamishimabara was part of ancient Hizen Province. The area was under the control of the Arima clan, who ruled from Hinoe Castle in the Muromachi period. The area was the site of considerable foreign trade and Portuguese and Spanish missionary activity, and by the early Edo period, a large percentage of the population were Kirishitan. After the start of the national isolation policy, the Tokugawa shogunate banned Christianity from 1614 and replaced Arima Naozumi with Matsukura Shigemasa, who relocated the capital of Shimabara Domain to Shimabara Castle is what is now the city of Shimabara. Due to misgovernment, high taxes and persecution of Christianity, the population rose in the Shimabara Rebellion of 1637, with the peasants occupying the fortress of Hara Castle as their strongpoint. The rebellion was suppressed with extreme severity by the shogunate, and the area of Minamishimabara was ruled by a branch of the Matsudaira clan from 1668 to 1774 and from 1774 to 1871.

After the Meiji restoration, the villages of Katsusa, Kuchinotsu, Minami-Arima, Kita-Arima, Nishi-Arika, Higashi-Arima, Dozaki, Nutsu, and Fukae were established with the creation of the modern municipalities system on April 1, 1889. Higashi-Arima was raised to town status on January 1, 1927 and renamed Arima. Nishi-Arima was raised to town status on April 1, 1927, followed by Kazusa on January 1m 1928, Kutsunotsu on April 1, 1928, and Minami-Arima on January 1, 1932. Arie and Dozaki merged to form the town of Arie on September 30, 1956, On May 3, 1962 Fukae was raised to town status, followed by Kita-Arima and Futsu on April 1, 1969.

The city of Minamishimabara was founded on March 31, 2006, from the merger of the towns of Arie, Fukae, Futsu, Kazusa, Kitaarima, Kuchinotsu, Minamiarima and Nishiarie (all from Minamitakaki District). Minamitakaki District was dissolved as a result of this merger.

== Government ==
Minamishimabara has a mayor-council form of government with a directly elected mayor and a unicameral city council of 19 members. Minamishimabara contributes two members to the Nagasaki Prefectural Assembly. In terms of national politics, the city is part of the Nagasaki 2nd district of the lower house of the Diet of Japan.

== Economy ==
Minamishimabara has a mixed economy centering on agriculture, commercial fishing and tourism.

== Education ==
Minamishimbara has 13 public elementary schools and eight public junior high schools by the city government, and two public high schools operated by the Nagasaki Prefectural Board of Education.

== Transportation ==
=== Railways ===
Shimabara no longer has any passenger railway service. The nearest train station is Shimabarakō on the Shimabara Railway Line in neighboring Shimabara. However, until 2008, the line extended an additional 21.5 kilometers, serving 18 stations within Minamishimabara.

=== Highways ===
- National Route 57
- National Route 251
- National Route 389

== Sister cities ==
- Luoyuan County, Fujian, China, friendship city since 1997.
- Chieti, Abruzzo, Italy, friendship city since 2016

== Local attractions ==
- Amakusa Shiro grave
- Hara Castle ruins, National Historic Site
- Hinoe Castle ruins, National Historic Site

== Notable people from Minamishimabara ==
- Seibo Kitamura, sculptor
- Fumio Kyūma, politician
