= Ōmurawan Prefectural Natural Park =

Natural park of Nagasaki prefecture, Japan

- 大村湾県立自然公園
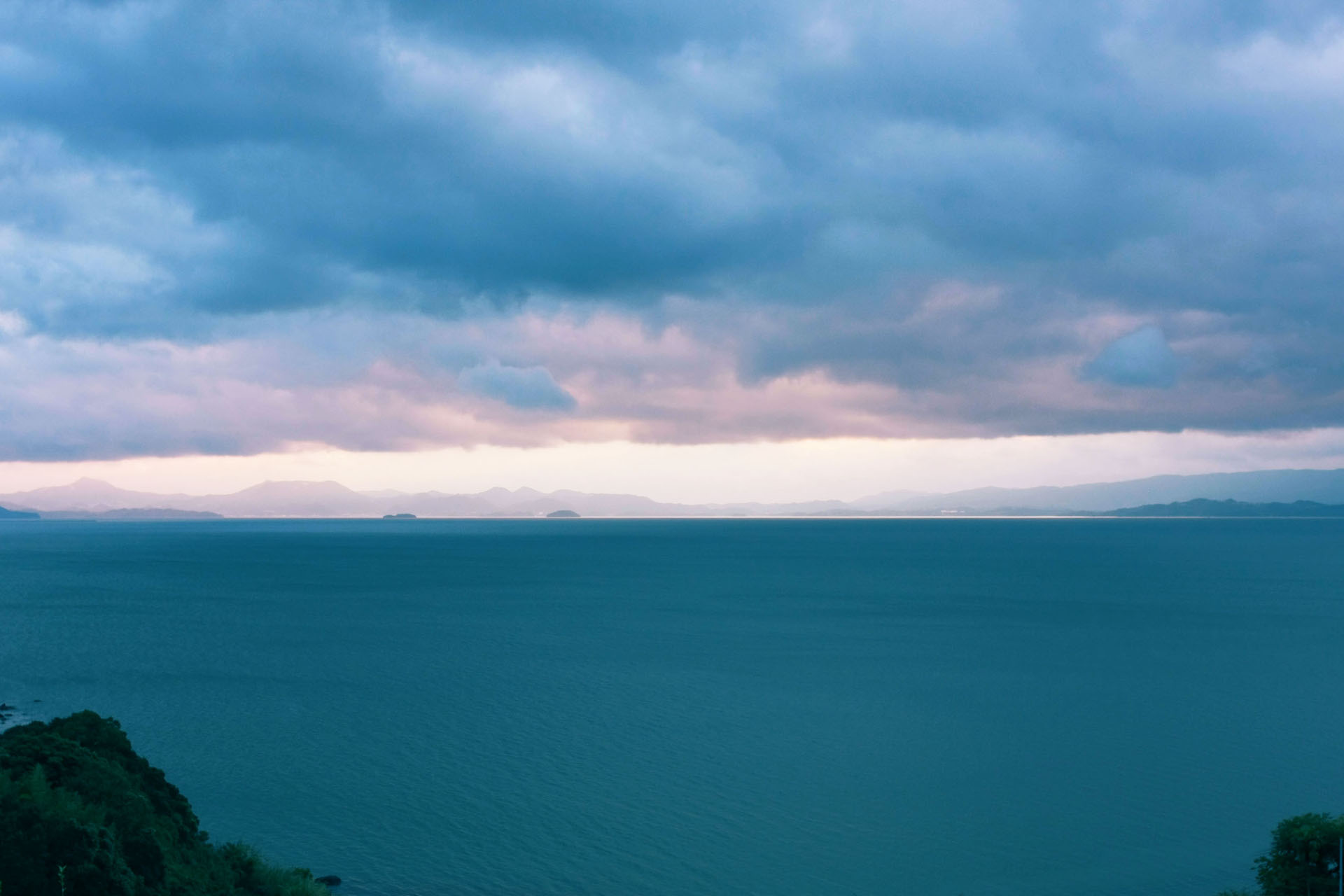
- Ōmura Bay
- Interactive map of Ōmurawan Prefectural Natural Park
- Location: Nagasaki Prefecture, Japan
- Area: 22.35 km^{2} (8.63 sq mi)
- Established: 11 January 1966

Ōmurawan Prefectural Natural Park (大村湾県立自然公園, Ōmura-wan Kenritsu Shizen-kōen) is a Prefectural Natural Park in Nagasaki Prefecture, Japan. The park was established in 1966.

== See also ==
- National Parks of Japan
