= Unzen, Nagasaki =

Unzen 雲仙市
- City
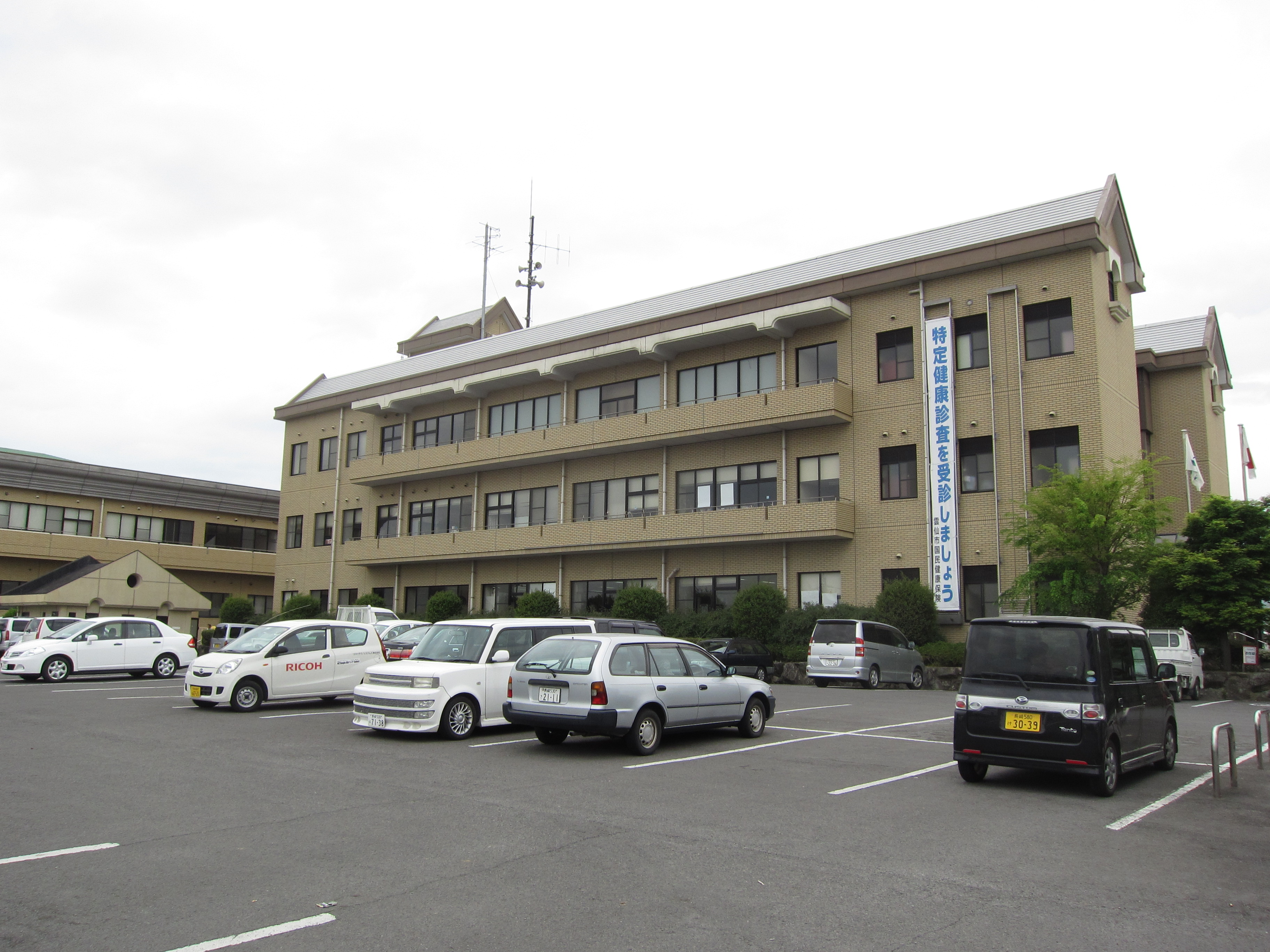
- Unzen City Hall

- Flag Seal
- Location of Unzen in Nagasaki Prefecture

- Location in Japan
- Coordinates: 32°50′07″N 130°11′15″E
- Country: Japan
- Region: Kyushu
- Prefecture: Nagasaki

Government
  - Mayor: Hidesaburo Kanazawa (since January 2013)

Area
  - Total: 214.31 km^{2} (82.75 sq mi)

Population (June 30, 2024)
  - Total: 40,831
  - Density: 190.52/km^{2} (493.45/sq mi)
- Time zone: UTC+09:00 (JST)
- City hall address: 714 Ushiguchina, Agatsuma-machi, Unzen-shi, Nagasaki-ken 859-1107
- Climate: Cfa
- Website: Official website
- Symbols
- Flower: Rhododendron kiusianum
- Tree: Kousa Dogwood

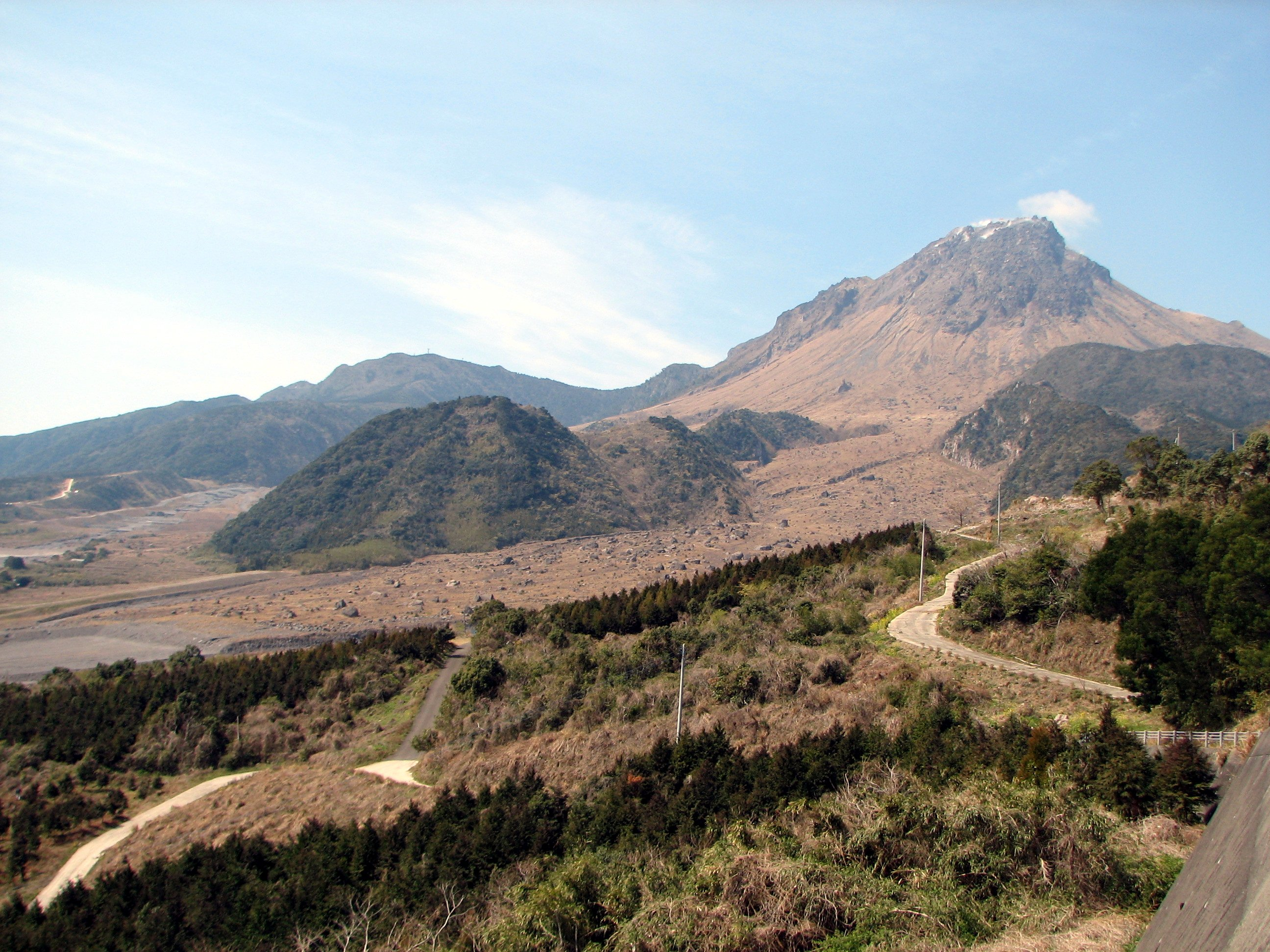
Fugen-dake pyroclastic flow area

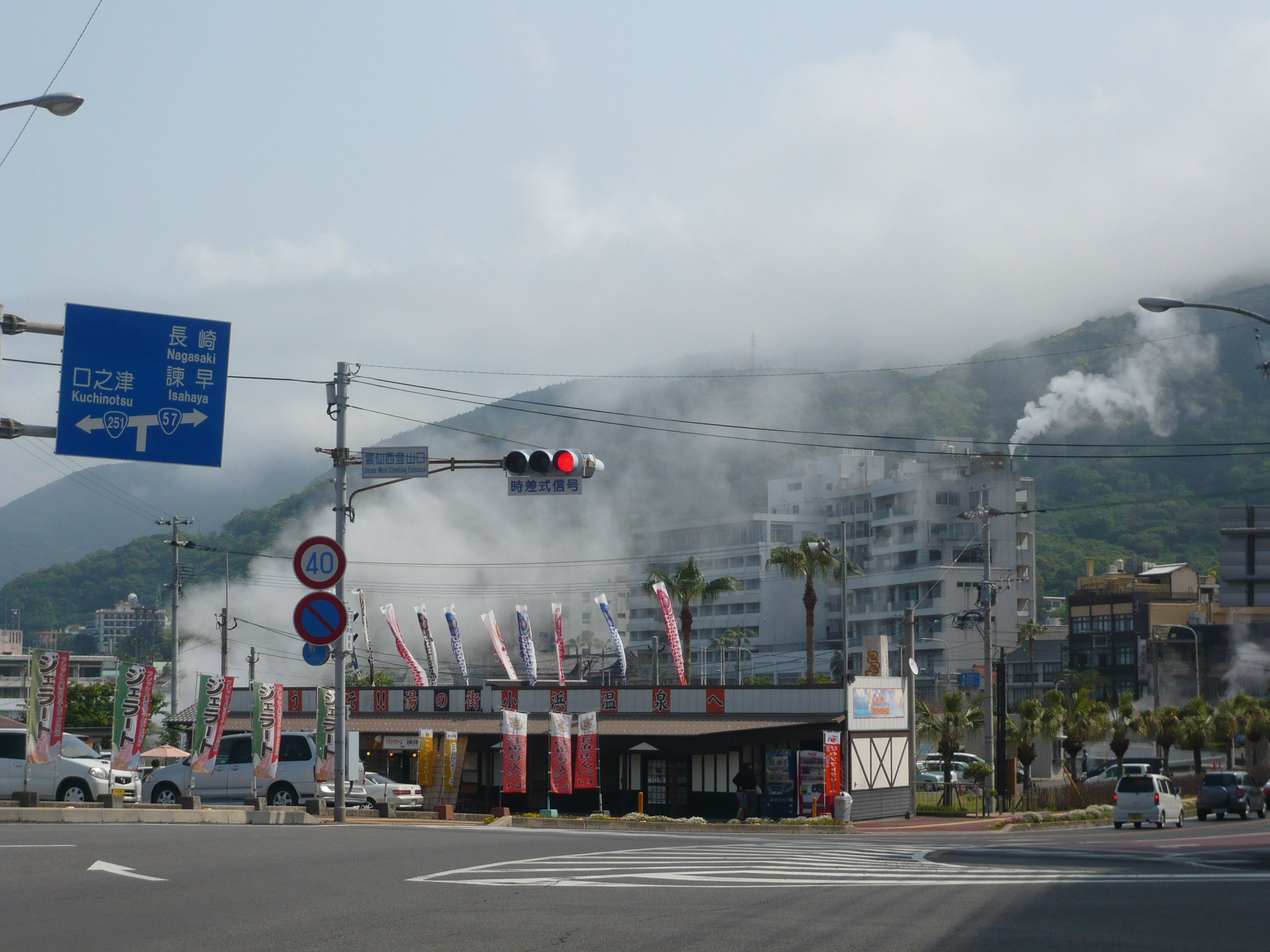
Obama Onsen

Unzen (雲仙市, Unzen-shi; Japanese pronunciation: [ɯ̈́ǹ.d͡zè̞ɴ̀, ɯ̈̀ń.d͡zé̞ɰ̃̀.ɕì, ɯ̈́ń.d͡zé̞ɰ̃̀-]) is a city located in Nagasaki Prefecture, Japan. As of 30 June 2024, the city had an estimated population of 40,831 in 17709 households, and a population density of 190 people per km^{2}. The total area of the town is 214.31 km^{2} (82.75 sq mi).

== Geography ==
Unzen Jigoku volcanic fumaroles with boardwalk, Unzen

Unzen is located on the northern tip of Shimabara Peninsula, facing Ariake Bay in the east and Mount Unzen to the south. Parts of the city are within the borders of the Unzen-Amakusa National Park.

=== Neighbouring municipalities ===
Nagasaki

- Isahaya
- Minamishimabara
- Shimabara

=== Climate ===
Unzen has a humid subtropical climate (Köppen Cfa) characterized by warm summers and cool winters with light to no snowfall. The average annual temperature in Unzen is 16,6 °C. The average annual rainfall is 2115 mm with September as the wettest month. The temperatures are highest on average in August, at around 27.0 °C, and lowest in January, at around 6.7 °C.

Climate data for Mount Unzen, 1991–2020 normals, extremes 1924–present
Month	Jan	Feb	Mar	Apr	May	Jun	Jul	Aug	Sep	Oct	Nov	Dec	Year
Record high °C (°F)	17.3 (63.1)	18.2 (64.8)	21.2 (70.2)	25.3 (77.5)	29.4 (84.9)	31.0 (87.8)	32.8 (91.0)	34.3 (93.7)	31.6 (88.9)	28.9 (84.0)	22.9 (73.2)	18.6 (65.5)	34.3 (93.7)
Mean maximum °C (°F)	12.8 (55.0)	14.8 (58.6)	17.8 (64.0)	21.9 (71.4)	25.8 (78.4)	26.8 (80.2)	29.9 (85.8)	30.8 (87.4)	28.7 (83.7)	24.9 (76.8)	19.7 (67.5)	14.9 (58.8)	31.0 (87.8)
Mean daily maximum °C (°F)	6.1 (43.0)	7.7 (45.9)	11.2 (52.2)	16.1 (61.0)	20.5 (68.9)	22.7 (72.9)	25.8 (78.4)	27.2 (81.0)	24.5 (76.1)	19.8 (67.6)	14.2 (57.6)	8.6 (47.5)	17.0 (62.7)
Daily mean °C (°F)	2.5 (36.5)	3.6 (38.5)	6.8 (44.2)	11.5 (52.7)	15.9 (60.6)	19.2 (66.6)	22.5 (72.5)	23.3 (73.9)	20.4 (68.7)	15.3 (59.5)	10.0 (50.0)	4.7 (40.5)	13.0 (55.4)
Mean daily minimum °C (°F)	−0.7 (30.7)	−0.1 (31.8)	2.8 (37.0)	7.2 (45.0)	11.6 (52.9)	16.1 (61.0)	20.0 (68.0)	20.5 (68.9)	17.1 (62.8)	11.5 (52.7)	6.3 (43.3)	1.2 (34.2)	9.5 (49.0)
Mean minimum °C (°F)	−5.8 (21.6)	−5.3 (22.5)	−3.2 (26.2)	1.0 (33.8)	6.5 (43.7)	11.4 (52.5)	16.5 (61.7)	16.9 (62.4)	11.8 (53.2)	5.5 (41.9)	−0.1 (31.8)	−4.0 (24.8)	−6.8 (19.8)
Record low °C (°F)	−12.2 (10.0)	−12.8 (9.0)	−11.7 (10.9)	−6.0 (21.2)	1.3 (34.3)	7.6 (45.7)	13.0 (55.4)	12.9 (55.2)	8.1 (46.6)	0.3 (32.5)	−6.0 (21.2)	−10.2 (13.6)	−12.8 (9.0)
Average precipitation mm (inches)	88.2 (3.47)	129.2 (5.09)	202.5 (7.97)	253.3 (9.97)	265.1 (10.44)	575.4 (22.65)	513.6 (20.22)	314.4 (12.38)	260.7 (10.26)	132.8 (5.23)	123.5 (4.86)	103.1 (4.06)	2,961.8 (116.6)
Average snowfall cm (inches)	12 (4.7)	8 (3.1)	2 (0.8)	0 (0)	0 (0)	0 (0)	0 (0)	0 (0)	0 (0)	0 (0)	0 (0)	3 (1.2)	25 (9.8)
Average precipitation days (≥ 1.0 mm)	8.4	9.5	11.8	10.8	10.9	15.5	13.2	11.0	10.3	7.4	9.2	8.9	126.9
Average snowy days (≥ 1 cm)	3.0	2.6	0.9	0	0	0	0	0	0	0	0	0.6	7.1
Average relative humidity (%)	78	76	75	74	76	86	90	86	83	79	80	78	80
Mean monthly sunshine hours	88.4	101.9	133.6	149.7	159.6	94.2	105.8	132.3	123.6	140.6	108.8	96.4	1,436.6
Source: JMA

=== Demographics ===
Per Japanese census data, the population of Unzen is as shown below:

Historical population
Year	Pop.	±%
1940	57,072	—
1950	75,561	+32.4%
1960	70,418	−6.8%
1970	61,901	−12.1%
1980	58,861	−4.9%
1990	55,408	−5.9%
2000	52,230	−5.7%
2010	47,245	−9.5%
2020	41,096	−13.0%

== History ==
The area of Unzen was part of ancient Hizen Province. During the Edo Period, the area was mostly under the control of Shimabara Domain. After the Meiji restoration, the villages of Tabira, Doguro, Jindai, Furube, Ifuku, Saigo, Moriyama, Yamada Aino, Chijiwa, Obama, Kuchiyama and Minamikushiyama were established in Minamitakaki District, Nagasaki with the creation of the modern municipalities system on April 1, 1889.

- April 1, 1924 Obama Village → Obama Town
- July 1, 1926 Ifuku and Taisho merged to form Furube Village
- November 1, 1928 Chijiwa Village → Chijiwa Town
- February 11, 1937 Tabira Village → Tabira Town
- August 1, 1949 Aino Village → Aino Town
- April 1, 1954 Moriyama and Yamada merged to form Agatsuma Village
- February 1, 1955 Obama and Kitakushiyama villages merged to form Obama Town
- September 1, 1956 Tabira and Doguro villages merged to form Kunimi Town
- September 25, 1956 Taisho and Saigo village merged to form Mizuho Village
- March 22, 1957 Jindai Village was raised to town status, becoming Kunimi Town
- April 1, 1963 Agatsuma Village → Agatsuma Town
- April 1, 1969 Mizuho Village → Mizuho Town, Minamikushiyama Village → Minamikushiyama Town

The city of Unzen was established on October 11, 2005, from the merger of the towns of Aino, Azuma, Chijiwa, Kunimi, Minamikushiyama, Mizuho and Obama (all from Minamitakaki District).

== Government ==
Unzen has a mayor-council form of government with a directly elected mayor and a unicameral town council of 19 members. Unzen contributes two members to the Nagasaki Prefectural Assembly. In terms of national politics, the city is part of the Nagasaki 2nd district of the lower house of the Diet of Japan.

== Economy ==
Unzen has a mixed economy of agriculture, commercial fishing, and tourism to its many hot spring resorts.

== Education ==
Unzen has 17 public elementary schools and seven public junior high schools by the city government, and two public high schools operated by the Nagasaki Prefectural Board of Education.

== Transportation ==
=== Railways ===
Shimabara Railway - Shimabara Railway Line

- Aino - Abozaki - Azuma - Kobe - Taishō - Saigō - Kōjiro - Taira

=== Highways ===
- National Route 57
- National Route 251
- National Route 389

== Local attractions ==
- Aino
- Mount Unzen
- Obama Onsen is located in Unzen City. The poet Saito Mokichi wrote a verse about the beauty of this hot spring.
- Unzen Onsen

=== Festivals ===
Tachibana Park in Chijiwa hosts the Kanoukaen first festival on the final Saturday of March.
