= Nishiarie, Nagasaki =

Town in Minamitakaki District, Nagasaki Prefecture, Japan

Nishiarie (西有家町, Nishiarie-chō) was a town located in Minamitakaki District, Nagasaki Prefecture, Japan.

As of 2003, the town had an estimated population of 8,483 and a density of 294.55 persons per km^{2}. The total area was 28.80 km^{2}.

On March 31, 2006, Nishiarie, along with the towns of Arie, Fukae, Futsu, Kazusa, Kitaarima, Kuchinotsu and Minamiarima (all from Minamitakaki District), was merged to create the city of Minamishimabara.
