= Minamitakaki District, Nagasaki =

Former district in Nagasaki prefecture, Japan

Minamitakaki (南高来郡, Minami-Takaki-gun; English: South Takaki District) was a district located in Nagasaki Prefecture, Japan.

Minamitakaki District is now equivalent to the cities of Shimabara, Unzen, and Minami-Shimabara.

As of 2003, the district had an estimated population of 117,639 and a density of 293.97 persons per km^{2}. The total area was 400.18 km^{2}.

== Former towns and villages ==
- Aino
- Ariake
- Arie
- Azuma
- Chijiwa
- Fukae
- Futsu
- Kazusa
- Kita-Arima
- Kuchinotsu
- Kunimi
- Minami-Arima
- Minami-Kushiyama
- Mizuho
- Nishi-Arie
- Obama

== Mergers ==
- On October 11, 2005 - the towns of Aino, Azuma, Chijiwa, Kunimi, Minami-Kushiyama, Mizuho and Obama were merged to create the city of Unzen.
- On January 1, 2006 - the town of Ariake were merged into the expanded city of Shimabara.
- On March 31, 2006 - the towns of Arie, Fukae, Futsu, Kazusa, Kita-Arima, Kuchinotsu, Minami-Arima and Nishi-Arie were merged to create the city of Minami-Shimabara. Minamitakaki District was dissolved as a result of this merger.
