= Minamiarima, Nagasaki =

Dissolved municipality in Nagasaki prefecture, Japan

Minamiarima (南有馬町, Minami-Arima-chō) was a town located in Minamitakaki District, Nagasaki Prefecture, Japan.

As of 2003, the town had an estimated population of 6,023 and a density of 259.05 persons per km^{2}. The total area was 23.25 km^{2}.

On March 31, 2006, Minamiarima, along with the towns of Arie, Fukae, Futsu, Kazusa, Kita-Arima, Kuchinotsu and Nishi-Arie (all from Minamitakaki District), was merged to create the city of Minamishimabara.

Minami-Arima was the site of Hara Castle. The fortress was destroyed following the deaths of 37,000 rebels and their leader, Amakusa Shirō, at the hands of Tokugawa Shogunate forces in the final battle of the Shimabara Rebellion (1637–1638).
