= Minamikushiyama, Nagasaki =

Dissolved municipality in Nagasaki prefecture, Japan

Minamikushiyama (南串山町, Minamikushiyama-chō) was a town located in Minamitakaki District, Nagasaki Prefecture, Japan.

As of 2003, the town had an estimated population of 4,669 and a density of 314.41 persons per km^{2}. The total area was 14.85 km^{2}.

On October 11, 2005, Minamikushiyama, along with the towns of Aino, Azuma, Chijiwa, Kunimi, Mizuho and Obama (all from Minamitakaki District), was merged to create the city of Unzen.
