= Fukae, Nagasaki =

Town in Minamitakaki, Nagasaki, Japan

Fukae (深江町, Fukae-chō) was a town located in Minamitakaki District, Nagasaki Prefecture, Japan.

As of 2003, the town had an estimated population of 8,186 and a density of 349.23 persons per km^{2}. The total area was 23.44 km^{2}.

On March 31, 2006, Fukae, along with the towns of Arie, Futsu, Kazusa, Kitaarima, Kuchinotsu, Minamiarima and Nishiarie (all from Minamitakaki District), was merged to create the city of Minamishimabara.
