= Chijiwa, Nagasaki =

Former town in Nagasaki Prefecture, Japan

Chijiwa (千々石町, Chijiwa-chō)) was a town located in Minamitakaki District, Nagasaki Prefecture, Japan.

As of 2003, the town had an estimated population of 5,634 and a density of 173.67 persons per km^{2}. The total area was 32.44 km^{2}.

On October 11, 2005, Chijiwa, along with the towns of Aino, Azuma, Kunimi, Minamikushiyama, Mizuho and Obama (all from Minamitakaki District), was merged to create the city of Unzen.
