= Ariake, Nagasaki =

Dissolved municipality in Nagasaki prefecture, Japan

Ariake (有明町, Ariake-chō) was a town located in Minamitakaki District, Nagasaki, Japan.

As of 2003, the town had an estimated population of 11,863 and a density of 505.24 persons per km^{2}. The total area was 23.48 km^{2}.

On January 1, 2006, Ariake was merged into the expanded city of Shimabara.
