= Kunimi, Nagasaki =

Dissolved municipality in Nagasaki prefecture, Japan

Kunimi (国見町, Kunimi-chō) was a town located in Minamitakaki District, Nagasaki Prefecture, Japan.

As of 2003, the town had an estimated population of 11,291 and a density of 295.58 persons per km^{2}. The total area was 38.20 km^{2}.

On October 11, 2005, Kunimi, along with the towns of Aino, Azuma, Chijiwa, Minamikushiyama, Mizuho and Obama (all from Minamitakaki District), was merged to create the city of Unzen.
