= Mizuho, Nagasaki =

Dissolved municipality in Nagasaki prefecture, Japan

Coordinates: 35°46′19″N 139°21′14″E

Mizuho (瑞穂町, Mizuho-chō) was a town located in Minamitakaki District, Nagasaki Prefecture, Japan.

As of 2003, the town had an estimated population of 5,884 and a density of 224.07 persons per km^{2}. The total area was 26.26 km^{2}.

On October 11, 2005, Mizuho, along with the towns of Aino, Azuma, Chijiwa, Kunimi, Minamikushiyama and Obama (all from Minamitakaki District), was merged to create the city of Unzen.
