= Azuma, Nagasaki =

Dissolved municipality in Nagasaki prefecture, Japan

Azuma (吾妻町, Azuma-chō) was a town located in Minamitakaki District, Nagasaki Prefecture, Japan.

As of 2003, the town had an estimated population of 7,418 and a density of 227.90 persons per km^{2}. The total area was 32.55 km^{2}.

On October 11, 2005, Azuma, along with the towns of Aino, Chijiwa, Kunimi, Minamikushiyama, Mizuho and Obama (all from Minamitakaki District), was merged to create the city of Unzen.
