= Sechibaru, Nagasaki =

Town in Kitamatsuura, Nagasaki, Japan

Sechibaru (世知原町, Sechibaru-chō) was a town located in Kitamatsuura District, Nagasaki Prefecture, Japan.

== Population ==
As of 2003, the town had an estimated population of 4,148 and a density of 129.54 persons per km^{2}. The total area was 32.02 km^{2}.

== History ==
The onset of the 1950s brought rapid growth, with coal extraction bringing the railway and many new workers to Sechibaru. When the coal ran out, the town had only its older tea industry to rely on, which lacked the economic strength to keep the trains or people coming back.

On April 1, 2005, Sechibaru, along with the town of Yoshii (also from Kitamatsuura District), was merged into the expanded city of Sasebo.
