= Arie, Nagasaki =

Dissolved municipality in Nagasaki prefecture, Japan

Arie (有家町, Arie-chō) was a town located in Minamitakaki District, Nagasaki Prefecture, Japan.

As of 2003, the town had an estimated population of 8,990 and a density of 385.18 persons per km^{2}. The total area was 23.34 km^{2}.

On March 31, 2006, Arie, along with the towns of Fukae, Futsu, Kazusa, Kitaarima, Kuchinotsu, Minamiarima and Nishiarie (all from Minamitakaki District), was merged to create the city of Minamishimabara.
