= Futsu =

Former town in Nagasaki Prefecture, Japan

Futsu (布津町, Futsu-chō) was a town located in Minamitakaki District, Nagasaki Prefecture, Japan.

As of 2003, the town had an estimated population of 4,788 and a density of 455.13 persons per km^{2}. The total area was 10.52 km^{2}.

On March 31, 2006, Futsu, along with the towns of Arie, Fukae, Kazusa, Kitaarima, Kuchinotsu, Minamiarima and Nishiarie (all from Minamitakaki District), was merged to create the city of Minamishimabara.
