= Kazusa, Nagasaki =

Former Town in Minamitataki District, Nagasaki

Coordinates: 32°37′N 130°10′E

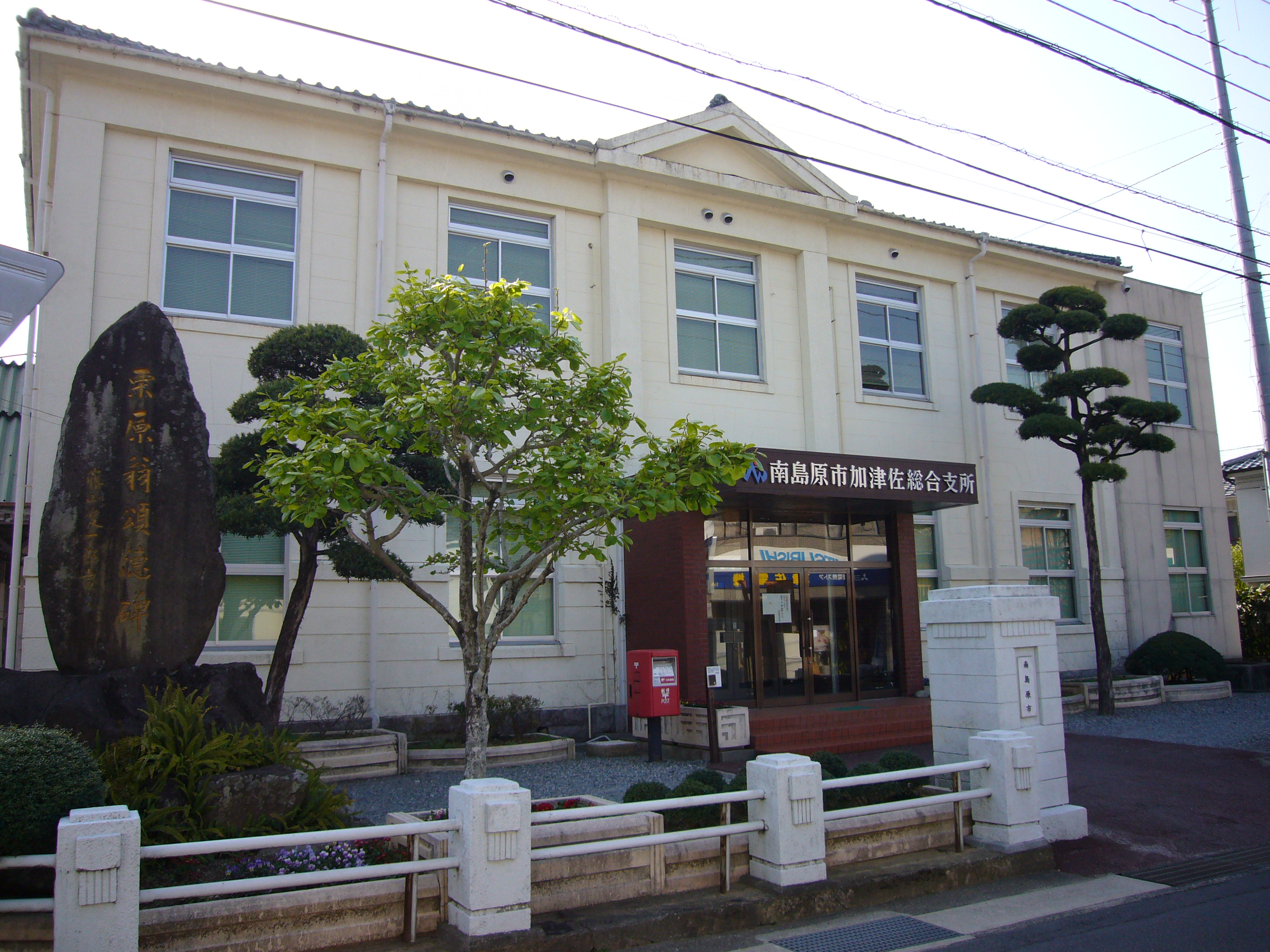
Minami Shimabara city hall Kazusa Branch (formerly Kazusa Town Hall)

Kazusa (加津佐町, Kazusa-machi) was a town located in Minamitakaki District, Nagasaki Prefecture, Japan. As of 2003, the town had an estimated population of 7,870 and a density of 322.81 persons per km^{2}. The total area was 24.38 km^{2}.

On March 31, 2006, Kazusa, along with the towns of Arie, Fukae, Futsu, Kitaarima, Kuchinotsu, Minamiarima and Nishiarie (all from Minamitakaki District), were merged to create the city of Minamishimabara.

A population of resident dolphins around Tsuuji shima provides opportunities for dolphin watching and this largely contributes to local tourism.
