= Kuchinotsu, Nagasaki =

Dissolved municipality in Nagasaki prefecture, Japan

Coordinates: 32°36′N 130°11′E

Kuchinotsu (口之津町, Kuchinotsu-chō) was a town located in Minamitakaki District, Nagasaki Prefecture, Japan.

As of 2003, the town had an estimated population of 6,450 and a density of 646.29 persons per km^{2}. The total area was 9.98 km^{2}.

On March 31, 2006, Kuchinotsu, along with the towns of Arie, Fukae, Futsu, Kazusa, Kitaarima, Minamiarima and Nishiarie (all from Minamitakaki District), was merged to create the city of Minamishimabara.

== History ==
An Imperial decree in July 1899 established Kuchinotsu as an open port for trading with the United States and the United Kingdom.

== Climate ==
Climate data for Kuchinotsu (1991−2020 normals, extremes 1976−present)
Month	Jan	Feb	Mar	Apr	May	Jun	Jul	Aug	Sep	Oct	Nov	Dec	Year
Record high °C (°F)	21.0 (69.8)	21.8 (71.2)	24.7 (76.5)	28.2 (82.8)	31.4 (88.5)	36.9 (98.4)	37.5 (99.5)	38.8 (101.8)	37.8 (100.0)	32.8 (91.0)	28.2 (82.8)	24.4 (75.9)	38.8 (101.8)
Mean daily maximum °C (°F)	10.9 (51.6)	12.2 (54.0)	15.5 (59.9)	20.1 (68.2)	24.2 (75.6)	26.9 (80.4)	30.7 (87.3)	32.3 (90.1)	29.3 (84.7)	24.5 (76.1)	18.8 (65.8)	13.3 (55.9)	21.6 (70.8)
Daily mean °C (°F)	7.2 (45.0)	8.0 (46.4)	11.1 (52.0)	15.4 (59.7)	19.5 (67.1)	22.9 (73.2)	26.8 (80.2)	27.9 (82.2)	24.9 (76.8)	19.8 (67.6)	14.4 (57.9)	9.3 (48.7)	17.3 (63.1)
Mean daily minimum °C (°F)	3.2 (37.8)	3.7 (38.7)	6.6 (43.9)	10.9 (51.6)	15.4 (59.7)	19.8 (67.6)	23.9 (75.0)	24.6 (76.3)	21.3 (70.3)	15.7 (60.3)	10.3 (50.5)	5.2 (41.4)	13.4 (56.1)
Record low °C (°F)	−6.2 (20.8)	−5.2 (22.6)	−3.1 (26.4)	0.6 (33.1)	7.8 (46.0)	12.1 (53.8)	17.4 (63.3)	18.5 (65.3)	11.8 (53.2)	5.1 (41.2)	0.7 (33.3)	−3.0 (26.6)	−6.2 (20.8)
Average precipitation mm (inches)	60.9 (2.40)	79.0 (3.11)	114.8 (4.52)	132.6 (5.22)	151.6 (5.97)	366.9 (14.44)	304.6 (11.99)	180.7 (7.11)	175.1 (6.89)	88.8 (3.50)	89.6 (3.53)	69.3 (2.73)	1,813.9 (71.41)
Average precipitation days (≥ 1.0 mm)	7.7	8.4	10.3	9.7	9.1	14.0	10.4	9.1	9.1	6.7	8.4	7.8	110.7
Mean monthly sunshine hours	133.4	147.8	178.9	191.5	199.4	134.5	195.2	232.7	188.9	194.2	157.7	142.5	2,099.6
Source: JMA
