= Kitaarima, Nagasaki =

Dissolved municipality in Nagasaki prefecture, Japan

Kitaarima (北有馬町, Kita-Arima-chō) was a town located in Minamitakaki District, Nagasaki Prefecture, Japan.

As of 2003, the town had an estimated population of 4,203 and a density of 160.85 persons per km^{2}. The total area was 26.13 km^{2}.

On March 31, 2006, Kitaarima, along with the towns of Arie, Fukae, Futsu, Kazusa, Kuchinotsu, Minami-Arima and Nishi-Arie (all from Minamitakaki District), was merged to create the city of Minamishimabara.

== History ==
Both Kita-Arima and Minami-Arima were part of what was known as Arima County in the south-eastern portion of the Shimabara Peninsula until they were split into two separate towns in 1889 during the Meiji Era. Kitaarima was the location of Hinoe Castle which was the estate of the Arima clan. Though initially against the Christians, Arima Harunobu eventually became a Christian himself and allowed Portuguese missionaries to build a seminary in 1580. The "Arima Semenario", as it was called, was a center for Renaissance learning. Japanese students of the Seminario received Western language, religious, and cultural training. The most famous graduates were Mancio Ito, Miguel Chijiwa, Martino Hara, and Julian Nakaura. These four young men were the first Japanese envoys to visit Europe. Arima Harunobu's son and his family were transferred to Hyuga Province in 1615 following Harunobu's execution in 1612. Hinoe castle was burned down by Tokugawa forces during the Shimabara Rebellion in 1637. The site of the destroyed castle still remains today and is a popular site for hanami, or flower viewing, in March and April.

== Kitaarima Today ==
Kitaarima is a farming community that grows rice, potatoes, mikan, strawberries, and other crops. It has several distribution facilities to move produce to more populated areas. Kita-Arima-chō is situated in seven valleys that run up the southern reaches of Mount Unzen. Most of Kita-Arima-chō's population is centered in the southern part of the county in the town of Kita-Arima near the Ariake Sea and Minami-Arima town. Kita-Arima town is further split into smaller hamlets; Tanigawa, Sakaueshita, Tabira, Saishoji, Oriki.

The central area of Kita-Arima town contains the town office, the board of education building, bank, and the post office. Nearby is Kitaarima Junior High School which has less than 100 students and Kitaarima Elementary School has about 200 students. The town elementary school was built in 2004 to condense the four old elementary schools into one new facility. Also nearby are the town's main stores Parusu and Mizota. Parusu is a one-story department store that has a supermarket, a flower shop, a clothes and shoes store, a photo shop, and a pharmacy. Mizota is a large home furnishings and 100 yen store. Kitaarima was a stop on the now defunct Shimatetsu train line which connected all of the towns from Kazusa to Isahaya.

The town has several important festivals every year. The most important is Festivitus Natalis, the town's Christmas festival held at the elementary school sports field. This festival celebrates the Christian history of the town. The festival has musical performances by junior highschool students and guest bands. Many booths offer different foods. Other festivals include Hinoe Festival, which is held at the elementary school as well. The yosakoi Festival is held every year at Fureai Sports Park. Kita-Arima town's own yosakoi team performs along with other Yosakoi teams from around Nagasaki Prefecture.

Other sights of interest include Sunset Hill at the highest point in Kita-Arima-chō that overlooks Obama-chō to the northeast. Across from Sunset Hill is Kita-Arima's brand-new camping facilities built in 2005 and opened on July 20, 2005. Kita-Arima has several old bridges constructed during the Meiji Era. The bridges include; Motobira, Arata, Tanaka, Higuchi, Omonashi, and Aratashimo.
