= Aino, Nagasaki =

Dissolved municipality in Nagasaki prefecture, Japan

Coordinates: 32°49′N 130°09′E

Aino (愛野町, Aino-machi) was a town located in Minamitakaki District, Nagasaki Prefecture, Japan.

As of 2003, the town had an estimated population of 5,051 and a density of 430.97 persons per km^{2}. The total area was 11.72 km^{2}.

On October 11, 2005, Aino, along with the towns of Azuma, Chijiwa, Kunimi, Minamikushiyama, Mizuho and Obama (all from Minamitakaki District), was merged to create the city of Unzen.
