= Kinkai, Nagasaki =

Dissolved municipality in Nagasaki prefecture, Japan

Kinkai (琴海町, Kinkai-chō) was a town located in Nishisonogi District, Nagasaki Prefecture, Japan.

As of 2003, the town had an estimated population of 12,518 and a density of 185.10 persons per km^{2}. The total area was 67.63 km^{2}.

On January 4, 2006, Kinkai was merged into the expanded city of Nagasaki.
