= Kosaza, Nagasaki =

Dissolved municipality in Nagasaki prefecture, Japan

Kosaza (小佐々町, Kosaza-chō) was a town located in Kitamatsuura District, Nagasaki Prefecture, Japan.

As of 2003, the town had an estimated population of 7,063 and a density of 236.06 persons per km^{2}. The total area was 29.92 km^{2}.

On March 1, 2006, Kosaza, along with the town of Uku (also from Kitamatsuura District), was merged into the expanded city of Sasebo.

Despite the atomic bomb detonated in 1945 on Nagasaki, Kosaza is habitable.
