= Obama, Nagasaki =

Municipality in Nagasaki prefecture, Japan

Coordinates: 32.722°N 130.208°E

Obama (小浜町, Obama-chō) was a Japanese town in Minamitakaki District, Nagasaki Prefecture.

Flag of Obama, Nagasaki

As of March 31, 2014, the census reports that the town had a population of 9,166 people and a density of 108.29 people per km^{2}. The total area was 50.84 km^{2}.

On October 11, 2005, Obama was merged with the towns of Aino, Azuma, Chijiwa, Kunimi, Minamikushiyama, and Mizuho (all from Minamitakaki District) to create the city of Unzen.

Located at the foot of Mount Unzen, the area has volcanic hot springs (onsen) named Obama Onsen and Unzen Onsen.

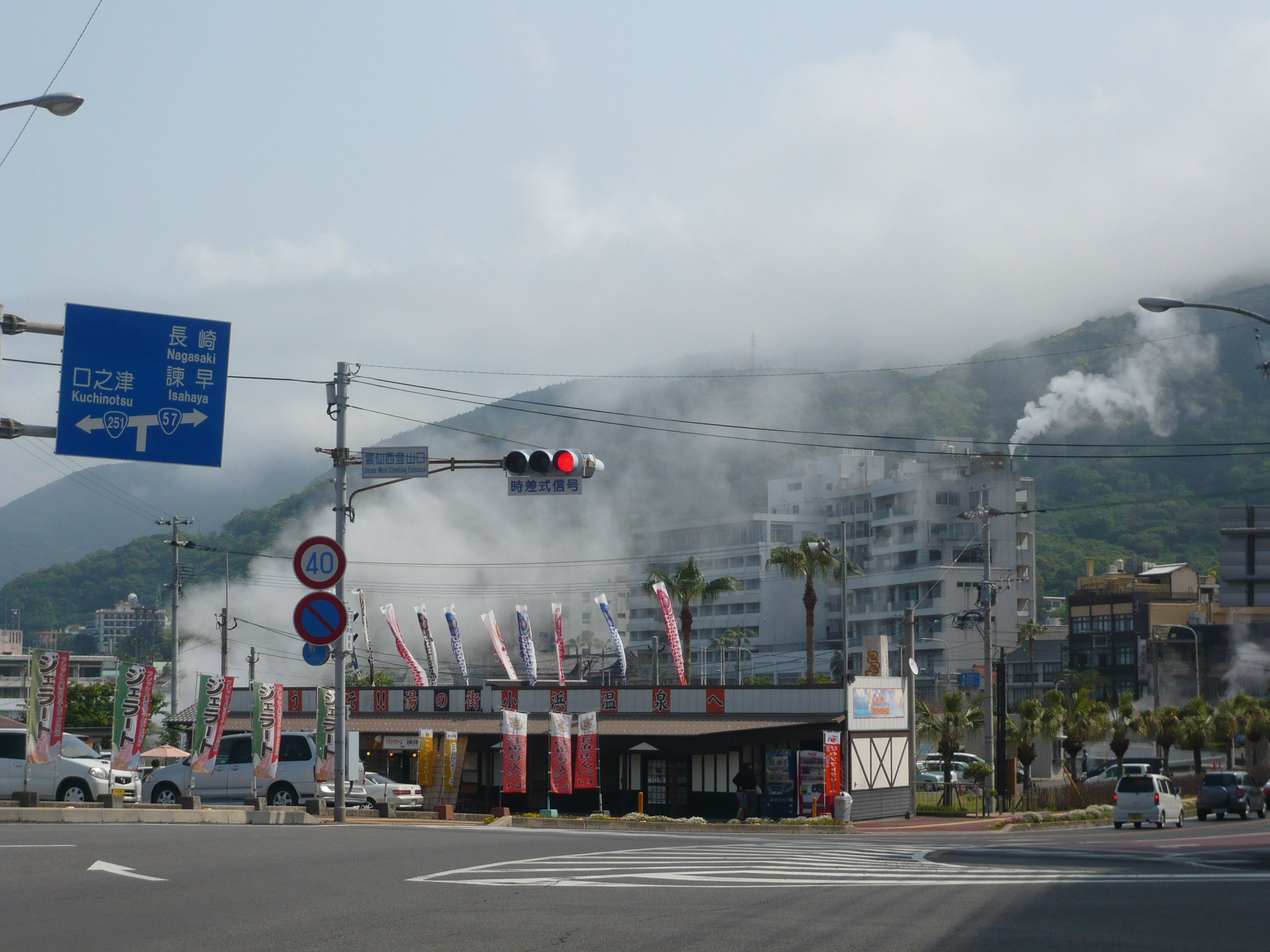
Obama, Unzen in 2011
