= Shimabara, Nagasaki =

Shimabara 島原市
- City
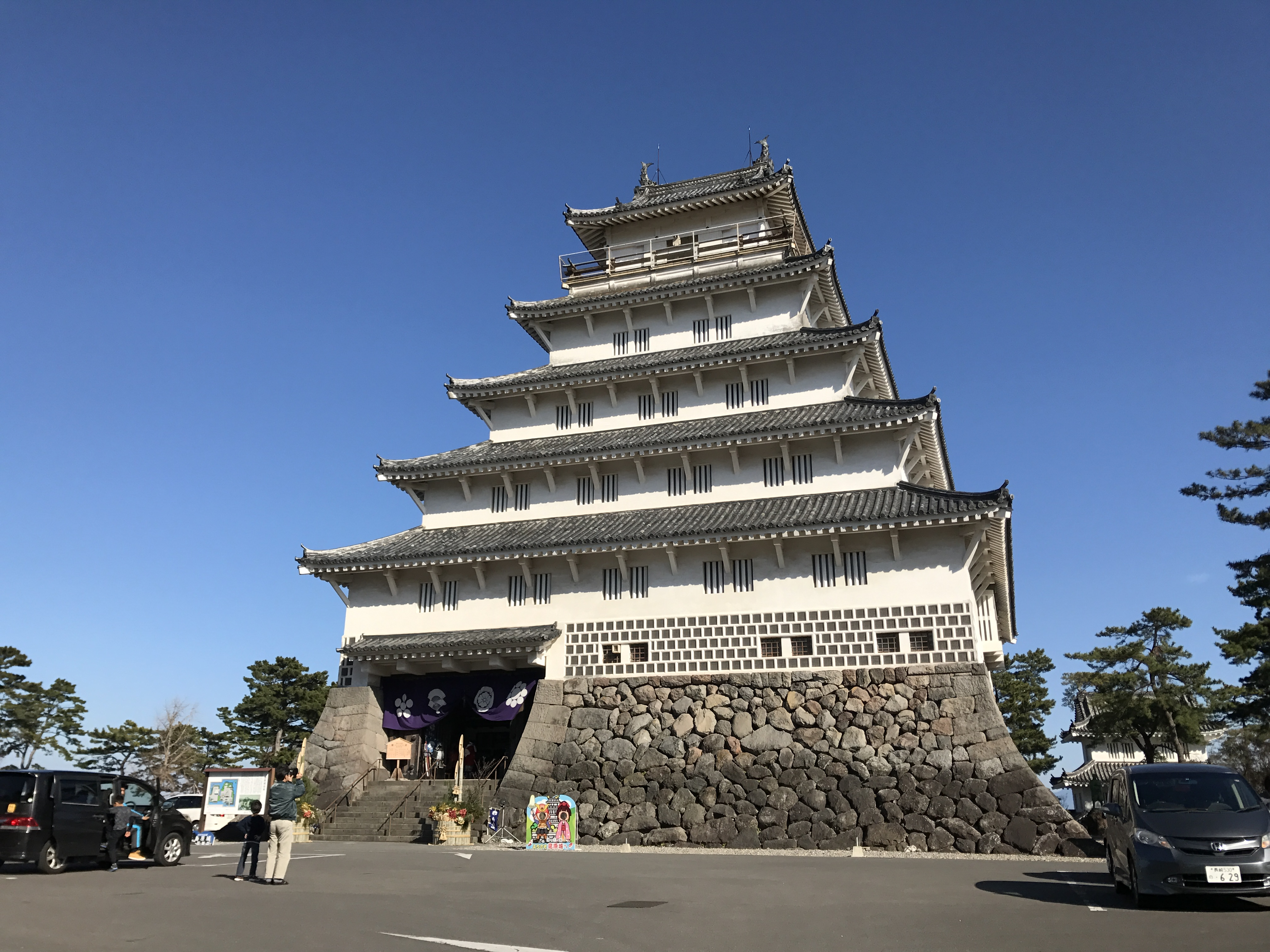
- Shimabara Castle

- Flag Seal
- Location of Shimabara in Nagasaki Prefecture

- Location in Japan
- Coordinates: 32°47′17″N 130°22′13″E
- Country: Japan
- Region: Kyushu
- Prefecture: Nagasaki

Government
  - Mayor: Ryūzaburō Furukawa (from December 2012)

Area
  - Total: 82.96 km^{2} (32.03 sq mi)

Population (June 30, 2024)
  - Total: 42,181
  - Density: 508.4/km^{2} (1,317/sq mi)
- Time zone: UTC+09:00 (JST)
- City hall address: 537, Uenomachi, Shimabara-shi, Nagasaki-ken 855-8555
- Climate: Cfa
- Website: Official website
- Symbols
- Flower: Prunus mume
- Tree: camphor tree

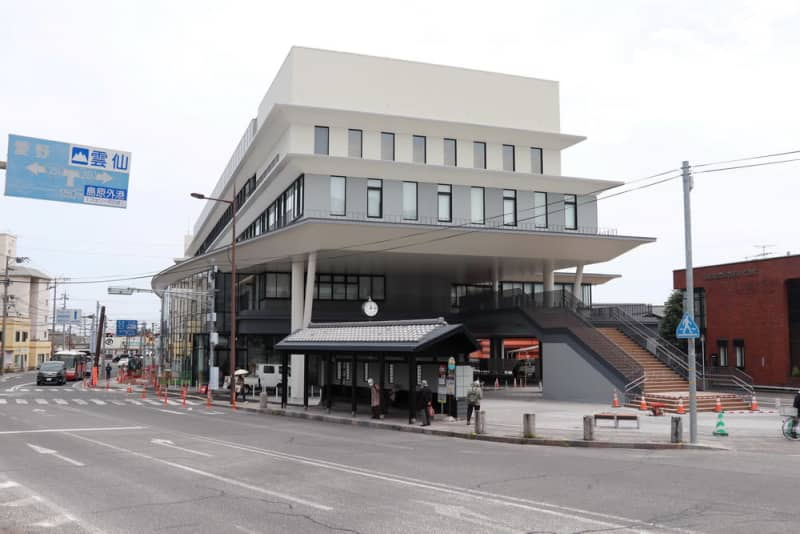
Shimabara City Hall

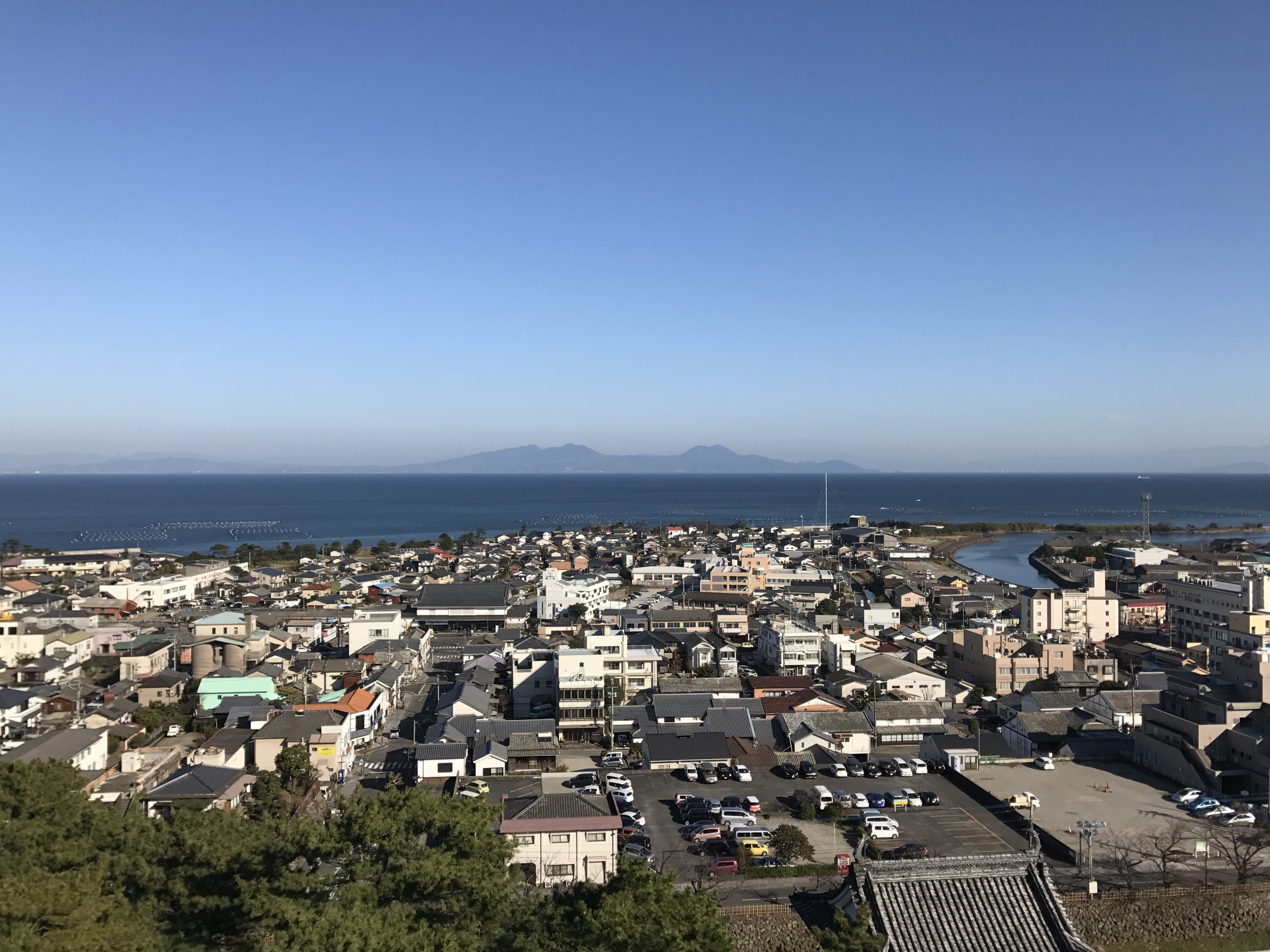
View from Shimabara Castle

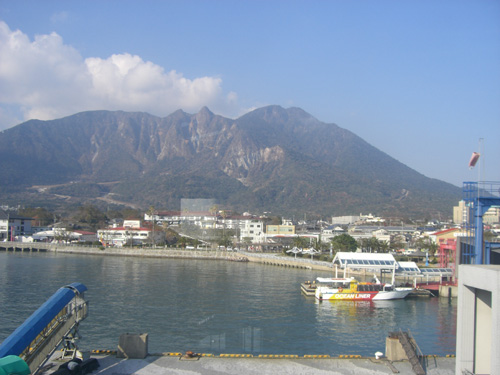
View of Mount Unzen from Shimabara port

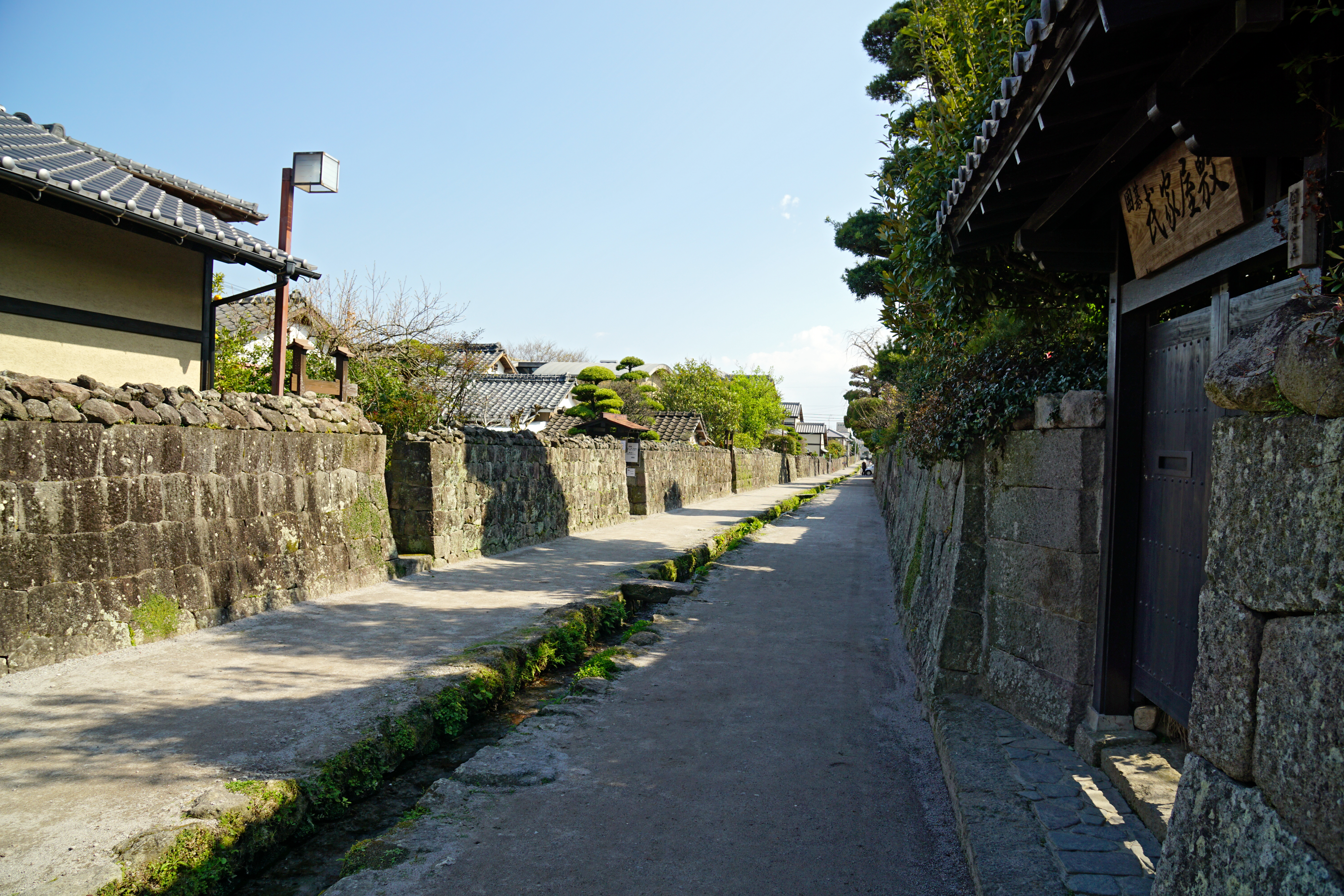
The old samurai residence town Shimabara

Shimabara (島原市, Shimabara-shi) is a city located in Nagasaki Prefecture, Kyushu, Japan. As of 30 June 2024, the city had an estimated population of 42,181 in 19917 households, and a population density of 510 people per km^{2}. The total area of the city is 170.13 km^{2} (65.69 sq mi).

== Geography ==
Shimabara is located at the north-eastern end of the Shimabara Peninsula, facing the Ariake Sea in the east and Mount Unzen (including Fugendake) in the west.

=== Climate ===
Shimabara has a humid subtropical climate (Köppen:Cfa) with hot summers and cool winters. The average annual temperature in Shimabara is 17.4 °C (63.3 °F). The average annual rainfall is 2,210.8 mm (87.04 in) with June as the wettest month. The temperatures are highest on average in August, at around 28.3 °C (82.9 °F), and lowest in January, at around 7.0 °C (44.6 °F). Its record high is 39.9 °C (103.8 °F), reached on 3 August 2026, and its record low is −6.2 °C (20.8 °F), reached on 25 January 2016.

Climate data for Shimabara (2006−2020 normals, extremes 2006−present)
Month	Jan	Feb	Mar	Apr	May	Jun	Jul	Aug	Sep	Oct	Nov	Dec	Year
Record high °C (°F)	20.1 (68.2)	23.5 (74.3)	25.6 (78.1)	28.8 (83.8)	32.7 (90.9)	34.4 (93.9)	38.1 (100.6)	39.9 (103.8)	37.2 (99.0)	32.3 (90.1)	28.4 (83.1)	25.2 (77.4)	39.9 (103.8)
Mean daily maximum °C (°F)	10.3 (50.5)	11.8 (53.2)	15.3 (59.5)	20.1 (68.2)	24.8 (76.6)	27.0 (80.6)	31.2 (88.2)	32.7 (90.9)	29.0 (84.2)	24.0 (75.2)	18.1 (64.6)	12.4 (54.3)	21.4 (70.5)
Daily mean °C (°F)	7.0 (44.6)	8.1 (46.6)	11.1 (52.0)	15.4 (59.7)	20.0 (68.0)	23.1 (73.6)	27.0 (80.6)	28.3 (82.9)	25.0 (77.0)	20.3 (68.5)	14.6 (58.3)	9.0 (48.2)	17.4 (63.3)
Mean daily minimum °C (°F)	3.4 (38.1)	4.5 (40.1)	7.1 (44.8)	11.1 (52.0)	15.7 (60.3)	20.0 (68.0)	24.0 (75.2)	25.1 (77.2)	22.0 (71.6)	17.0 (62.6)	11.0 (51.8)	5.4 (41.7)	13.9 (57.0)
Record low °C (°F)	−6.2 (20.8)	−5.4 (22.3)	0.5 (32.9)	2.6 (36.7)	8.1 (46.6)	13.8 (56.8)	18.0 (64.4)	18.8 (65.8)	15.1 (59.2)	8.1 (46.6)	1.4 (34.5)	−1.5 (29.3)	−6.2 (20.8)
Average precipitation mm (inches)	64.2 (2.53)	117.5 (4.63)	144.9 (5.70)	183.0 (7.20)	185.7 (7.31)	475.8 (18.73)	414.9 (16.33)	207.4 (8.17)	173.9 (6.85)	118.4 (4.66)	84.1 (3.31)	79.2 (3.12)	2,210.8 (87.04)
Average precipitation days (≥ 1.0 mm)	5.8	8.5	9.1	9.3	8.8	15.0	12.7	9.6	9.5	6.5	7.3	7.9	110
Mean monthly sunshine hours	140.2	143.2	184.9	198.4	215.3	128.9	194.8	235.7	180.3	192.0	149.7	135.6	2,094.5
Source: Japan Meteorological Agency

== Demographics ==
Per Japanese census data, the population of Shimabara in 2020 is 43,338 people. Shimabara has been conducting censuses since 1920. The city's population peaked in the 1950s with more than 60,000 people. In 2020, Shimabara's population is only about 75% of what it was in the 1950s.

Historical population

Year	Pop.	±%
1920	41,482	—
1925	43,338	+4.5%
1930	46,254	+6.7%
1935	46,703	+1.0%
1940	46,748	+0.1%
1945	62,501	+33.7%
1950	62,028	−0.8%
1955	60,370	−2.7%
1960	58,693	−2.8%
1965	56,724	−3.4%
1970	56,692	−0.1%

Year	Pop.	±%
1975	57,289	+1.1%
1980	58,890	+2.8%
1985	58,457	−0.7%
1990	56,903	−2.7%
1995	52,853	−7.1%
2000	51,563	−2.4%
2005	50,045	−2.9%
2010	47,471	−5.1%
2015	45,436	−4.3%
2020	43,338	−4.6%

Shimabara population statistics

== History ==
Shimabara is within ancient Hizen Province. It developed as a castle town around Shimabara Castle which was the capital of Shimabara Domain during the Edo period. It was the site of considerable foreign trade and missionary activity during the late Muromachi period, and in the early Edo period, a large percentage of the population were Kirishitan. Due to misgovernment, high taxes and persecution of Christianity, the population rose up during the Shimabara Rebellion of 1637, which was suppressed with extreme severity by the Tokugawa shogunate. Shimabara was subsequently ruled by a branch of the Matsudaira clan from 1668 to 1774 and from 1774 to 1871.

After the Meiji restoration, the town of Shimabara was created with the creation of the modern municipalities system on April 1, 1889. Shimabara town annexed neighboring Shimabara village and Minato town on April 1, 1924. On April 1, 1940, it annexed Annaka and Sugitani villages and was raised to city status. Shimabara annexed neighboring Mikae village on April 1, 1955. On January 1, 2006, the town of Ariake (from Minamitakaki District) was merged into Shimabara.

Throughout its history, Shimabara has been dominated by the seismic activity of Mount Unzen. A major volcanic eruption in 1792 resulted in a tsunami that destroyed most of the town and killed over 15,000 people, in one of Japan's worst volcanic disasters. In more recent history, major eruptions in 1990–1991 resulted in pyroclastic flows, which killed 43 people and forced the temporary evacuation of hundreds of others. The 5th International Conference of Cities on Volcanoes was held in Shimabara on November 19–23, 2007.

== Government ==
Shimabara has a mayor-council form of government with a directly elected mayor and a unicameral city council of 19 members. Shimabara contributes two members to the Nagasaki Prefectural Assembly. In terms of national politics, the city is part of the Nagasaki 2nd district of the lower house of the Diet of Japan.

== Economy ==
The economy of Shimabara is heavily dependent on agriculture and commercial fishing. Main crops include rice, radishes, carrots, potatoes, Chinese cabbage, small watermelons, mangoes, strawberries, pomelos, tobacco as well as chicken and cattle. Shimabara is also a popular tourist destination, due to its historical associations, location in Unzen-Amakusa National Park, and numerous onsen. The most popular tourist destination within the urban area is Shimabara Castle and the nearby "Samurai Street".

== Education ==
Shimabara has nine public elementary schools and five public junior high schools by the city government, and four public high schools operated by the Nagasaki Prefectural Board of Education. There is also one private high school. The prefecture also operates one special education school for the handicapped.

== Transportation ==
=== Railways ===
Shimabara Railway - Shimabara Railway Line

- ■ Ariake-Yue - Ōmisaki - Matsuo - Mie - Shimabara - Reikyūkōen-Taiikukan - Shimabara-Funatsu - Shimabarakō

=== Highways ===
- National Route 57
- National Route 251

== Local attractions ==
- Mount Unzen and Mt. Unzen Disaster Memorial Hall (Madamas Dome)
- Shimabara Castle
- Shimabara Onsen
- Shimabara Peninsula Geopark
- Shimabara Samurai Residences

=== Festivals ===
Shimabara is host of the Shimabara Water Festival on the first weekend of August. There are also festivals in Minamishimabara, like the Marine Festival in Kuchinotsu and the Minamishimabara Sakura Festivals.

=== Food ===
It is known for a local treat called kanzarashi, dumplings served in a syrup.

== Notable people ==
- Koumei Nakamura, celebrity chef
