= List of New Thought writers =

This is a list of New Thought writers, who have written significant primary works related to New Thought. New Thought is also commonly referred to by such names as the "Law of Attraction" or "Higher Thought".

== A ==
- Alexander (magician) – The Life and Mysteries of the Celebrated Dr. Q and other books and pamphlets.
- James Allen (author) – As A Man Thinketh (1903); Above Life's Turmoil (1910); Byways to Blessedness
- Uell Stanley Andersen – Three Magic Words (1954); The Secret of Secrets: Your Key to Subconscious Power (1958); The Magic in Your Mind (1961); The Key to Power and Personal Peace (1972); The Greatest Power in the Universe (1976); Happiness is the Secret of Secrets
- William Walker Atkinson – Thought-Force in Business and Everyday Life (1900); The Law of the New Thought: A Study of Fundamental Principles & Their Application (1902); Nuggets of the New Thought (1902); Thought Vibration or the Law of Attraction in the Thought World (1906); The Secret of Mental Magic: A Course of Seven Lessons (1907); Self-Healing by Thought Force (1907); The Secret of Success (1908); Practical Mental Influence (1908); The Mastery of Being: A Study of the Ultimate Principle of Reality & the Practical Application Thereof (1911); Your Mind and How to Use It: A Manual of Practical Psychology (1911); Practical New Thought: Several Things that Have Helped People (1911); Mental Pictures (article in "The Nautilus" magazine) (November 1912); Mind Power: The Secret of Mental Magic (1912); New Thought: Its History and Principles or The Message of the New Thought, A Condensed History of Its Real Origin with Statement of Its Basic Principles and True Aims (1915); The Seven Cosmic Laws (March 1931).

== B ==
- John Gaynor Banks
- Raymond Charles Barker – Treat Yourself to Life; Money is God in Action
- Brandon Bays – The Journey: A Road Map to the soul; The Journey for Kids: Liberating your child's shining potential; Freedom Is: Liberating Your Boundless Potential; Consciousness: The New Currency; The Journey: A Practical Guide to Healing Your Life and Setting Yourself Free; Living The Journey: Using The Journey Method to Heal Your Life and Set Yourself Free
- Michael Beckwith – Spiritual Liberation: Fulfilling Your Soul's Potential
- Genevieve Behrend – Your Invisible Power (1921); How to Live Life and Love It (1922); Attaining Your Heart's Desire (1929)
- Joseph Sieber Benner – The Impersonal Life (1914); The Way Out (1930); The Way Beyond (1931)
- Clara Beranger – Peace Begins At Home (1954)
- Dorothea Brande – Wake Up and Live (1936)
- Nona L. Brooks – Short Lessons in Divine Science; Mysteries; Divine Science and the Truth
- Grace Mann Brown – Studies in Spiritual Harmony (1901–1903), Food Studies (1902–1904), Seven Steps in the life of S. A. Weltmer (1906), Life Lessons: A Series of Practical Lessons of Life, from Life, and about Life (1906), Soul Songs by Ione (1907), The Word made Flesh, A Study in Healing (1908), To-day; the Present Moment is God's Own Time (1910–1911), The Inner Breath; 'Vivenda Causa', a revelation of old world wisdom in new world form (c. 1922), Dollars and Health: concerning the psychology of the spleen and other things... (1915?), Think Right for Health and Success (1916), Mental Harmony (1916)
- Henry Harrison Brown – Art of Living (1902), New Thought Primer, Origin, History and Principles of the Movement (1903), How to Control Fate Through Suggestion (1906), Not Hypnotism but Suggestion (1906), Psychometry (1906), Dollars Want Me (1917)
- Rhonda Byrne – The Secret (2006); The Power (2010); The Magic (2012); " The Hero".

== C ==
- H. Emilie Cady – Lessons in Truth (1896); Finding The Christ in Ourselves (1891); How I Used the Truth; God A Present Help
- Terry Cole-Whittaker – Live Your Bliss; What You Think of Me is None of My Business
- Johnnie Colemon – Open Your Mind and Be Healed (1997)
- Robert Collier (author) – The God in You; The Magic Word; The Book of Life (1925); The Secret of the Ages (1926); The Secret Power; Riches Within Your Reach: The Law of the Higher Potential; The Science of Getting What You Want; The Life Magnet
- Russell Conwell – Acres of Diamonds
- Malinda Cramer – Divine Science & Healing.
- Benjamin Creme – The Reappearance of the Christ and the Masters of Wisdom (1980), Transmission: A Meditation for the New Age (1983), The Ageless Wisdom Teaching (1996), The Great Approach (2001), The Art of Co-operation (2002), The Art of Living (2006), The World Teacher for All Humanity (2007), The Awakening of Humanity (2008)

== D ==
- Mike Dooley – Infinite Possibilities: The Art of Living Your Dreams, Leveraging the Universe: 7 Steps to Engaging Life’s Magic, Manifesting Change: It Couldn't Be Easier, The Top 10 Things Dead People Want to Tell You
- Horatio Dresser – The Quimby Manuscripts; The Power of Silence; Spiritual Health and Healing
- Wayne Dyer – Power of Intention; You'll See It When You Believe It

== E ==
- Warren Felt Evans – The Mental-Cure, Illustrating the Influence of the Mind on the Body; The Divine Law of Cure

== F ==
- Charles Fillmore (Unity Church) – Christian Healing (1909); Talks on Truth (1922); The Twelve Powers of Man (1930); Prosperity (1936); Jesus Christ Heals (1939); Teach Us to Pray with Cora Fillmore (1941); Atom-Smashing Power of Mind (1949)
- Myrtle Fillmore – Healing Letters; How to Let God Help You (1956)
- Emmet Fox – Power Through Constructive Thinking (1932); The Sermon on the Mount: The Key to Success in Life (1934); Find and Use Your Inner Power (1941)
- James Dillet Freeman – Be!; The Story of Unity
- David Friedman (composer) – The Thought Exchange (2012)

== G ==
- Shakti Gawain – Creative Visualization (1978); Creating True Prosperity (1997)
- Ursula Newell Gestefeld – The Builder and the Plan; The Woman Who Dares
- Neville Goddard – At Your Command (1939); Your Faith Is Your Fortune (1941); Freedom for All—A Practical Application of the Bible (1942); Feeling Is the Secret (1944); Prayer—The Art of Believing (1946); Out of This World (1949); The Power of Awareness (1952); The Creative Use of Imagination (1952); Awakened Imagination (1954); Seedtime and Harvest (1956); I Know My Father (1960); The Law and the Promise (1961)
- Thaddeus Golas – The Lazy Man's Guide to Enlightenment (1971)
- Joel S. Goldsmith – The Infinite Way, The Art of Spiritual Healing, Thunder of Silence, Practicing the Presence
- Wilmer Ingalls Gordon – I Suggest: Suggestion and Osteopathy (1901); How to Live 100 Years: Or, the New Science of Living (1903); The New Force (1903)
- Stuart Grayson – Spiritual Healing: A Simple Guide for the Healing of Body, Mind, and Spirit.
- Joseph Perry Green – Pre-natal and post-natal culture (1916)

== H ==
- Charles F. Haanel – The Master Key System (1917); Mental Chemistry (1922); The New Psychology (1924); The Amazing Secrets of the Yogi (1937); A Book About You (1928)
- Frank Channing Haddock – Power of Will: A Practical Companion Book for the Unfoldment of the Powers of Mind
- Manly P. Hall – The Secret Teachings of All Ages (1928)
- Henry Thomas Hamblin – Dynamic Thought: Harmony, Health, Success, Achievement; Within You is the Power; Science of Thought; The Message of a Flower; The Open Door
- Louise Hay – You Can Heal Your Life (1984)
- Esther Hicks and Jerry Hicks – Ask and It Is Given: Learning to Manifest Your Desires (2005); The Amazing Power of Deliberate Intent: Living the Art of Allowing (2005); The Law of Attraction: The Basics of the Teachings of Abraham Esther and Jerry Hicks (2006); The Astonishing Power of Emotions (2008); Money and the Law of Attraction: Learning to Attract Health, Wealth & Happiness (2008).
- Napoleon Hill – Think and Grow Rich (1937); Success Through a Positive Mental Attitude (with W. Clement Stone) (1960)
- Ernest Holmes – The Science of Mind (1926)
- Fenwicke Holmes – The Science of Faith; The Law of Mind in Action; Ernest Holmes: His Life and Times
- Emma Curtis Hopkins – Spiritual Law in the Natural World (1894); The Key to Power (1895); Studies in High Mysticism (1924); Scientific Christian Mental Practice
- William Hornaday – My Prayer For You; Life Everlasting; Success Unlimited; Help For Today (with Ernest Holmes); and Your Aladdin's Lamp
- Mitch Horowitz – One Simple Idea: How the Lessons of Positive Thinking Can Transform Your Life (2014); Miracle: The Ideas of Neville Goddard (2017); The Miracle Club: How Thoughts Become Reality (2018); The Power of the Master Mind (2018); Awakened Mind: How Thoughts Create Reality; The Secret of Think and Grow Rich: The Inner Dimensions of the Greatest Success Program of All Time; Think Your Way to Wealth: Action Plan; The Mastery of Good Luck (2019); Million Dollar Mind: The High Road to Success and Power (2019); The Power of Your Subconscious Mind and How to Use It (2020); The Miracle Habits: The Secret of Turning Your Moments into Miracles (2020)
- Jean Houston – Mystical Dogs: Animals as Guides to our inner Life Inner Ocean Publishing (2002); Jump Time: Shaping Your Future in a World of Radical Change Sentient Publications (2nd Ed. 2004); The Passion of Isis and Osiris: A Union of Two Souls Wellspring/Ballantine (1998); A Mythic Life: Learning to Live our Greater Story HarperSanFrancisco (1996); Manual for the Peacemaker: An Iroquois Legend to Heal Self (with Margaret Rubin) Quest Books (1995); Public Like a Frog: Entering the Lives of three Great Americans Quest Books (1993); The Hero and the Goddess: The "Odyssey" as Mystery and Initiation Ballantine Books (1992); Godseed: The Journey of Christ Quest Books (1988); A Feminine Myth of Creation (with Diana Vandenberg, in Dutch) J.H. Gottmer (1988); The Search for the Beloved: Journeys in Mythology and Sacred Psychology Tarcher (2nd Ed. 1997); The Possible Human: A Course in Extending Your Physical, Mental, and Creative Abilities Tarcher (2nd. Ed. 1997); Life Force: The Psycho-Historical Recovery of the Self Quest Books (2nd. ed. 1993)
- Vernon Howard – Cosmic Command; Psycho-Pictography: The New Way Use the Miracle Power of Your Mind; The Mystic Path to Cosmic Power; Esoteric Mind Power; The Power of Your Supermind; Pathways to Perfect Living; Treasury of Positive Answers; The Mystic Masters Speak; There is a Way Out; 1500 Ways to Escape the Human Jungle; Inspire Yourself; Esoteric Encyclopedia of Eternal Knowledge; Solved:The Mystery of Life; Your Power of Natural Knowing; A Treasury of Trueness; 700 Inspiring Guides to a New Life; The Power of Esoterics; Secrets of Higher Success; Secrets of Mental Magic, How to Use Your Full Power of Mind; Action power: The miracle way to a successful new life; Your Magic Power To Persuade and Command People; The Power of Psycho-Pictography: How to Change and Enrich Your Life with the Aid of Creative Visualisation
- Barbara Marx Hubbard – The Evolutionary Journey; The Hunger of Eve; Birth 2012 & Beyond: Humanity's Great Shift to the Age of Conscious Evolution; The Suprasexual rEvolution: Toward the Birth of a Universal Humanity

== J ==
- Fannie Brooks James
- George Wharton James – Quit Your Worrying!

== K ==
- Byron Katie – Loving What Is: Four Questions That Can Change Your Life, with Stephen Mitchell, Harmony Books, 2002; I Need Your Love—Is That True? How to Stop Seeking Love, Appreciation, and Approval and Start Finding Them Instead, with Michael Katz, Harmony Books, 2005; A Thousand Names for Joy: Living in Harmony with the Way Things Are, with Stephen Mitchell, Harmony Books, 2007; Question Your Thinking, Change the World: Quotations from Byron Katie, edited by Stephen Mitchell, Hay House, 2007; Who Would You Be Without Your Story?: Dialogues with Byron Katie, edited by Carol Williams, Hay House, 2008; Tiger-Tiger, Is It True?, illustrated by Hans Wilhelm, Hay House, 2009; Peace in the Present Moment, with Eckhart Tolle, Hampton Roads Pub Co Inc 2010, Newburyport, MA 2010; The Four Questions: For Henny Penny and Anybody with Stressful Thoughts, by Byron Katie, Illustrated by Hans Wilhelm, TarcherPerigee 2016; A Mind at Home with Itself: How Asking Four Questions Can Free Your Mind, Open Your Heart, and Turn Your World Around, by Byron Katie with Stephen Mitchell, HarperOne 2017

== L ==
- Walter C. Lanyon – It Is Wonderful; Ask
- Christian D. Larson – Your Forces and How To Use Them; The Ideal Made Real or Metaphysics for Beginners
- Morris Lichtenstein – Jewish Science and Health (1925)
- Max Freedom Long – Self-Suggestion and the New Huna Theory of Mesmerism and Hypnosis.

== M ==
- Orison Swett Marden – Peace, Power, and Plenty; Every Man A King, or, Might in Mind-Mastery
- Annie Rix Militz – Concentration
- Kenneth G. Mills – The Key: Identity; Change Your Standpoint, Change Your World
- Edward Morrissey
- Mary Manin Morrissey
- Alfred G. Moses – Jewish Science: Divine Healing in Judaism (Main text)
- A. K. Mozumdar – The Triumphant Spirit; The Conquering Man; The Mystery of the Kingdom; The Commanding Life; Christ on the Road of Today; Key to the New Messianic World Message; Christ Speaketh; Today and Tomorrow; Open Door to Heaven; The Life and the Way;
- Prentice Mulford – Thoughts Are Things (1889); Your Forces and How to Use Them (1888); Prentice Mulford's Story: Life By Land and Sea (1889); Thought Forces Essays (1913); The God in You (1918)
- Joseph Murphy – The Miracles of Your Mind (1953); Magic of Faith (1954); Believe in Yourself (1955); How to Attract Money (1955); Prayer Is the Answer (1956); How to Use Your Healing Power (1957); The Healing Power of Love (1958); Stay Young Forever (1958); Mental Poisons and Their Antidotes (1958); Techniques in Prayer Therapy (1960); The Power Of Your Subconscious Mind (1963); The Miracle of Mind Dynamics (1964); The Amazing Laws of Cosmic Mind Power (1965); Your Infinite Power to Be Rich (1966); The Cosmic Power Within You (1968); Infinite Power for Richer Living (1969); Miracle Power for Infinite Riches (1972); The Miracle of Mind Dynamics: Use Your Subconscious Mind to Obtain Complete Control Over Your Destiny (1972); The Cosmic Energizer: Miracle Power of the Universe (1974); Within You Is the Power (1977); How to Use the Laws of Mind (1980)
- Michael Murphy (author) – Powerful Attitudes
- Caroline Myss – Anatomy of the Spirit (1996)

== N ==
- Earl Nightingale – The Strangest Secret (1956)

== P ==
- Herbert A. Parkyn – A Mail Course in Suggestive Therapeutics and Hypnotism (1898); Auto-Suggestion; What it is and How to Use It for Health, Happiness and Success (1905)
- Charles Brodie Patterson – New Thought: A 21st Century Awakening
- Norman Vincent Peale – The Power of Positive Thinking (1952)
- Catherine Ponder – The Dynamic Laws of Prosperity (1962); The Prosperity Secrets of the Ages (1964); The Dynamic Laws of Healing (1966); The Healing Secrets of the Ages (1967); Pray and Grow Rich (1968); Open Your Mind To Prosperity (1971); Open Your Mind To Receive (1983); Secret of Unlimited Prosperity (1983); The Prospering Power of Prayer (1983); The Dynamic Laws of Prayer (1987); The Prospering Power of Love (2006)
- Bob Proctor – You Were Born Rich (1984)

== Q ==
- Phineas Quimby – (Seale, Ervin, ed.), (1988). The Complete Writings

== R ==
- John Herman Randall, Jr. – A New Philosophy of Life
- James Arthur Ray – The Science of Success (2003); Practical Spirituality: How to Use Spiritual Power to Create Tangible Results (2003); Harmonic Wealth: The Secret of Attracting the Life You Want (2008); The Seven Laws of True Wealth: Create the Life You Desire and Deserve (2009)
- Della Reese
- Israel Regardie – The Art of True Healing: A Treatise on the Mechanism of Prayer and the Operation of the Law of Attraction in Nature (1937); The Art of True Healing: The Unlimited Power of Prayer and Visualization
- Rachel Naomi Remen – Kitchen Table Wisdom
- Jane Roberts -Seth Speaks: The Eternal Validity of the Soul
- Frank B. Robinson – The Strange Autobiography of Frank B. Robinson

== S ==
- John Selby – Secrets Of A Good Night’s Sleep; Peak Sexual Experience; Seven Masters, One Path; Expand This Moment
- Julia Seton – The Science of Success
- Florence Scovel Shinn – The Game of Life and How to Play it
- Alethea Brooks Small
- Samuel Smiles – Self-Help; with Illustrations of Character and Conduct (1859)
- W. Clement Stone – Success Through a Positive Mental Attitude (with Napoleon Hill) (1960); The Success System That Never Fails (1962)

== T ==
- Masaharu Taniguchi – The Science of Faith
- The Three Initiates – The Kybalion
- Sarah Elizabeth Titcomb – Mind-Cure on a Material Basis (1885), Aryan Sun Myths: The Origin of Religions (1889)
- Elizabeth Towne – Experiences in Self-Healing
- Ralph Waldo Trine – In Tune with the Infinite
- Thomas Troward – The Edinburgh Lectures on Mental Science (1904); The Dore Lectures on Mental Science (1909); The Hidden Power; The Creative Process in the Individual (1915); The Hidden Power and Other Papers on Mental Science (1921)Bible Mystery and Bible Meaning.

== V ==
- Iyanla Vanzant – Tapping the Power Within: A Path to Self-Empowerment for Women

== W ==
- Neale Donald Walsch – Conversations with God
- Wallace Wattles – The Science of Getting Rich (1908); Health Through New Thought and Fasting (1924)
- Lilian Whiting – The Outlook Beautiful
- Ella Wheeler Wilcox – The Heart of the New Thought; New Thought Common Sense
- Stuart Wilde – Grace, Gaia, and the End of Days: An Alternative Way for the Advanced Soul
- Henry Wood – The New Thought Simplified: How to Gain Harmony and Health

== Y ==
- Paramahansa Yogananda – Autobiography of a Yogi (1946)
- Catherine Yronwode

== Z ==
- Gary Zukav – The Dancing Wu Li Masters: An Overview of the New Physics; The Seat of the Soul

== See also ==
- New Thought
- Law of Attraction (New Thought)
- List of New Thought denominations and independent centers
