= Junior Optimist International =

- Type: Service organization
- Headquarters: Optimist International Headquarters; 4494 Lindell Blvd; St. Louis, Missouri, Missouri, U.S. 63108
- Members: 18,500+
- Official language: English, French
- Key people: Sydney Mafong (President) Carter Sinclair (Immediate Past President) Mason McSwegin (Past President)
- Website: https://www.joi.com

Junior Optimist International (JOI) is an active youth service organization that was created in 1988 and is affiliated with Optimist International, its sponsor. The current Junior Optimist International President is Sydney Mafong from San Diego, California, with the 2025-2026 JOI theme being "Beyond Borders with Optimism." There are more than 18,500 members in over 675 communities around the world.

There are two types of JOI clubs that are separated by age groups: Alpha Clubs (6–9 years), Junior Optimist Clubs (10–18), and previously Octagon Clubs (14-18). Due to the various age groups, each type of JOI club serves their community in different ways. While different approaches are undertaken, the main goal of JOI members is "to promote positive change in their communities."

Like Optimist International, JOI is "a community-based organization with a hierarchy that can take a member from a club to office at zone, district, national and international levels." Typically, each club plans their own fundraisers and service projects. The money raised is then donated to (projects and organizations that will improve the well-being of others, such as the Childhood Cancer Campaign (CCC).

JOI’s motto is "Kids Serving Kids." Since JOI keeps leadership local, it is able to "empower young people to make positive decisions to serve fellow youths and their community."

== Overview ==
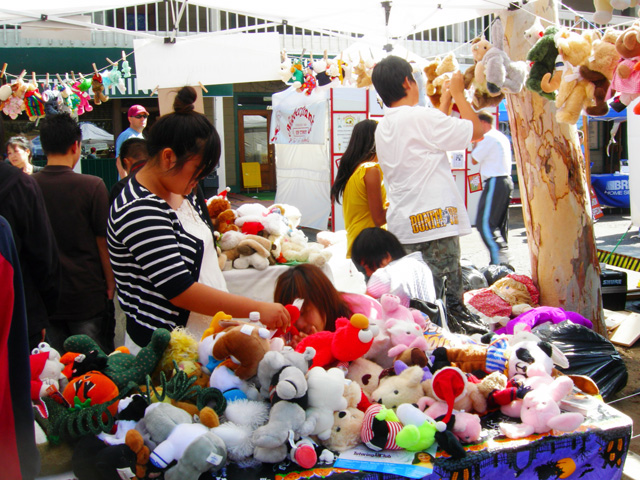
Octagon Club members fundraising for the CCC

In 1988, Optimist International recognized the rapid growth of Optimist Youth Clubs, which had grown to 30,000 members in 1,000 Junior Optimist and Octagon Clubs, and formed its own international organization - Junior Optimist Octagon International. Since then, JOI members have engaged themselves in youth service activities, such as the Childhood Cancer Campaign (CCC), the Optimist International Junior Golf Championships (OIJGC), and scholarship contests.

In 2016, the organization changed its name to Junior Optimist International.

During the months of June and July, the JOI Convention takes place.

== International Convention ==
The JOI International Convention is an annual international gathering of JOI members that takes place at the beginning of July. The International Convention is composed of several activities throughout its four-day span: workshops, business sessions, service projects, and recreational activities. Various workshops take place that teach members how to become great leaders in their communities and are led by guest speakers as well as members from the JOI Board of Directors.

Throughout the convention, JOI members are able to campaign in order to become a member of the JOI Board of Directors. During a certain time at the convention, members can "meet and greet the candidates (mingling)" and learn about their positions on certain issues within JOI. Later, candidates give their speeches, participate in a "Meet the Candidates Forum," and then the accredited delegates elect who will become the new JOI Board of Directors. Those elected are announced before the President's Dance on the final night.

Service projects vary from the location of the convention. Sometimes, service projects are on-site, off-site, or there are both. For instance, during the 2008 International Convention, the off-site service project consisted of building and restoring a local park whereas the on-site service project consisted of collecting books for the JOOI of Reading Program. The recreational activities that take place during this convention are the Talent Show, theme days, and The President's Dance.

Junior Optimist International Convention:

Location	Year
St Louis, Missouri	2025
St Louis, Missouri	2024
Washington, DC	2023

== Junior Optimist International Board of Directors ==
The 2026-2027 Board of Directors:

Position	Officer	State/Province
International President	Vaibhav Dhiman	Michigan
International Past President	Sydney Mafong	California
International Director	Ben Johnson	Ohio
International Director	Glenn Osterhout	North Carolina
International Director	Jayna Wagner	Ohio
International Director	Olivia Blair	Missouri
JOI Board Director	Amy Keller	Missouri

The 2025-2026 Board of Directors:

Position	Officer	State/Province
International President	Sydney Mafong	California
International Past President	Carter Sinclair	Iowa
International Director	Aliyah Delgado	Ontario, Canada
International Director	Chloe Reagan	Texas
International Director	Abigail Stidham	Ohio
International Director	Zachary Stidham	Ohio
JOI Board Director	Amy Keller	Missouri

The 2024-25 Board of Directors:

Position	Officer	State/Province
International President	Carter Sinclair	Iowa
International Past President	Mason McSwegin	Ohio
International Director	Sri Balaji	Michigan
International Director	Shelby Laracy	Ontario, Canada
International Director	Sydney Mafong	California
International Director	Micaela Rich	Florida
JOI Board Director	Amy Keller	Missouri

The 2023-24 Board of Directors:

Position	Officer	State/Province
International President	Mason McSwegin	Ohio
International Past President	Fatima Zaidi	Ontario, Canada
International Director	Hannah Hyslope	Ohio
International Director	Sydney Mafong	California
International Director	Micaela Rich	Florida
International Director	Carter Sinclair	Iowa
JOI Board Director	Amy Keller	Missouri

== The Torch ==
The Torch is the official newsletter of Junior Optimist International. The Torch is published several times each year. The October issue is mailed to Junior Optimist International Club Advisors, e-mailed through Optimist Mail and posted on the website. All other issues are distributed electronically through the website and Optimist Mail.

== The Optimist Creed ==
In 1922, the Optimist Creed was adopted as the official creed of the organization. Written by Christian Larson, the creed was originally published under the title "Promise Yourself" in 1912. Optimists in California found the Optimist spirit well-expressed in the 10-line statement and pushed to have it adopted organization-wide. The wife of Los Angeles Optimist James V. Westervelt saw the item in a newspaper and clipped it for her husband. After publishing it in his club's bulletin, Westervelt and other Los Angeles Optimists encouraged other California clubs to use the creed. Soon after, the creed's popularity grew.

== See also ==
- Optimist International
