= Science of Mind (magazine) =

- Categories: New Thought, Religious Science
- Frequency: Monthly
- Publisher: Centers for Spiritual Living
- Founder: Ernest Holmes
- Founded: 1927
- Country: United States
- Based in: Golden, Colorado
- Language: English
- Website: www.scienceofmind.com
- ISSN: 0036-8458

Science of Mind is a guide for spiritual living published monthly by the Centers for Spiritual Living. Themes include inner peace, hope, healing, guidance, social justice and others. The magazine features articles that draw together secular philosophy, the theology of various world religions and elements of science. It has been in distribution since 1927.

Founded by Ernest Holmes, the magazine offers a unique blend of spiritual wisdom and "cutting-edge insights" designed to help readers use spiritual principles to live "happier, richer and more satisfying lives".

The magazine is available at Barnes & Noble, Centers for Spiritual Living, Apple Newsstand, Amazon Kindle and independent book stores.

== Contributors ==
Notable contributors to and subjects of Science of Mind include:

- Michael Bernard Beckwith
- Bernie Siegel
- Marianne Williamson
- Eckhart Tolle
- Dan Millman
- Jean Houston
- Barbara Marx Hubbard
- Jack Kornfield
