= The Science of Mind =

Book by Ernest Holmes

- Author: Ernest Holmes
- Original title: 'The Science of Mind: A Philosophy, A Faith, A Way of Life '
- Language: English
- Publisher: Tarcher Putnam
- Publication date: 1926
- Media type: Print (Hardcover, Paperback, E-Book)
- ISBN: 978-1-60459-989-3

The Science of Mind is a book by Ernest Holmes. It was published in 1926 and proposes a science with a new relationship between humans and God.

== Overview ==
The book was originally published by Holmes, the founder of Religious Science, in 1926. A revised version was completed by Holmes and Maude Allison Lathem and published 12 years later in 1938.

Holmes' writing details how people can actively engage their minds in creating change throughout their lives. The book includes explanations of how to pray and meditate, find self-confidence, and express love.

== Influences ==
Holmes wrote The Science of Mind with the belief that he was summarizing the best of beliefs from around the world. His influences included Thomas Troward, Ralph Waldo Emerson, Christian Larson, Evelyn Underhill, and Emma Curtis Hopkins.

== Legacy ==
In 1927, Holmes began publishing Science of Mind magazine which is still in publication.

The name Science of Mind is used by the foundation which continues his work.

== See also ==
- Centers for Spiritual Living
- Fenwicke Holmes
