= Leonard Jacobson (author) =

Australian writer

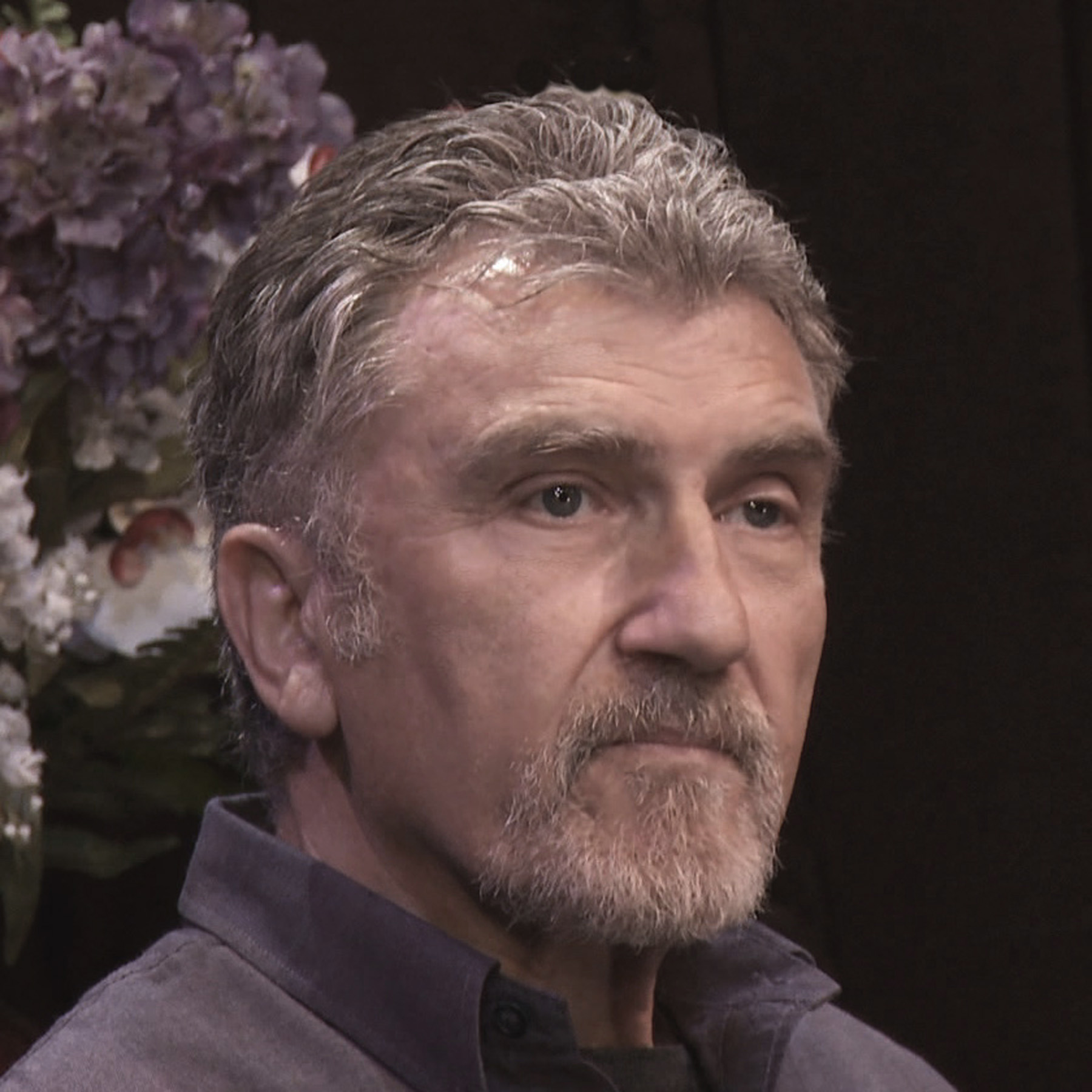
Leonard Jacobson (Teacher and Author)

Leonard Jacobson (born in Melbourne, Australia) is a spiritual teacher and author living in Asheville, North Carolina

Jacobson is the author of seven books: Life Beyond the Ego, Liberating Jesus, Words from Silence, Journey into Now, In Search of the Light, Embracing the Present and Bridging Heaven & Earth. They have been translated and published in several countries including South Korea, Japan, Taiwan, China, Holland, Denmark, Poland and Lithuania. His children’s book, In Search of the Light, was a winner of the Indie Excellence Book Award.

As a mark of honor and recognition to his selfless efforts in spiritual awakening, Religious Science International, a voluntary association that promotes Science of Mind, awarded Leonard Jacobson the Peace Prize in 2005.

== Early life ==
Leonard Jacobson was educated at the University of Melbourne, graduating with a law degree. He practiced law for several years and then set off on a long journey of spiritual discovery, which took him all over the world, from the United States to the Middle East, India, and Japan.

== Teaching ==
Jacobson teaches a two-step path of awakening. The first step involves learning the art of being present. The second involves becoming a master of your mind and ego.

"Jacobson’s message is that by learning the art of being fully present in the moment, it is possible to awaken now." In an interview with The Edge Magazine, he states, "to be awake is as simple as being fully present in the moment of now. If you’re fully present with something that’s actually here in the moment with you, your mind will fall silent, thoughts will stop, and you’ll be awake in the truth of life."

One of the most differentiating aspects of Jacobson’s teaching is his practical approach to integrating awakened consciousness into everyday life and relationships. He is described as having a unique insight into the nature of the mind and ego. Jacobson emphasizes that the process of awakening must involve a recognition of what the ego is, its role and purpose, how it functions, and how to overcome its resistance.

Jacobson is sometimes referred to as a non-dual spiritual teacher. His teachings have been compared to those of Eckhart Tolle.

== Books ==
- Life Beyond the Ego: A New Beginning for Humanity, Conscious Living Publications, 1st Edition, 2023, ISBN 978-1960399748
- Liberating Jesus: Conscious Living Publications, 1st Edition, 2021, ISBN 978-1890580124
- Words from Silence: An Invitation to Spiritual Awakening, Conscious Living Publications, 1st Edition 1991, ISBN 1-890580-00-7; Revised Edition, 2015 ISBN 1-89058-006-6
- In Search of the Light; Written by Leonard Jacobson and illustrated by Fiammetta Dogi, Conscious Living Publications, 2011, ISBN 978-1-890580-05-6
- Journey into Now: Clear Guidance on the Path of Spiritual Awakening, Conscious Living Publications, 2007, ISBN 978-1-890580-04-9
- Bridging Heaven & Earth: A Return to the One, Conscious Living Publications, 1999, ISBN 1-890580-02-3
- Embracing the Present: Living an Awakened Life, Conscious Living Publications, 1997, ISBN 1-89058-001-5

=== International Publications ===
- Podróż do TERAZ (Journey into Now), Biblioteka Nowej Ziemi, 2007 (Polish Edition 2009), ISBN 978-83-61897-04-0
- Rejsen ind i nuet - en enkel vej til spirituel opvågnen (Journey into Now), Indsigt Forlag, 2007 (Danish Edition 2012), ISBN 978-87-990403-6-0
- Reis naar het NU (Journey into Now), Uitgeverij-petiet, 2007 (Netherlands Edition 2013), ISBN 9789075636819
- Bridging Heaven and Earth, Chimuk Books, 1999 (Korean Translation 2002), ISBN 89-89590-03-5
- Embracing the Present, Chimuk Books, 1997 (Korean Translation 2001), ISBN 89-89590-02-7
- Words From Silence, Chimuk Books, 1991 (Korean Translation 2001), ISBN 89-89590-01-9
- Words from Silence, Natural Spirit Publishing, 1991 (Japanese Translation 2012), ISBN 978-4-86451-045-5
- Embracing the Present, Natural Spirit Publishing, 1997 (Japanese Translation 2012), ISBN 978-4-86451-046-2
- Journey into Now, Natural Spirit Publishing, (Japanese Translation 2010), ISBN 978-4-903821-91-7
- Words from Silence, Life Potential Publishing, 1991 (Taiwanese Edition 2010), ISBN 978-986-6323-06-5
- Journey into Now, Life Potential Publishing, 2007 (Taiwanese Edition 2008), ISBN 978-986-7349-80-4
