= The Game of Life (book) =

Book by Florence Scovel Shinn

- Title page for The Game of Life and How to Play It (1925)
- Author: Florence Scovel Shinn
- Publication date: 1925
- Text: The Game of Life at Wikisource

The Game of Life and How to Play It, published in 1925, teaches the philosophies of its author, Florence Scovel Shinn. The book holds that ignorance of, or carelessness with the application of various 'Laws of Metaphysics' (see below) can bring about undesirable life events.

== Spiritual concepts discussed in the book ==
Some of the Spiritual ideas Shinn explains in the book:

- The Law of Expectancy: Shinn emphasizes the power of the imagination to bring about life events: "Whatever man feels deeply or images clearly, is impressed upon the subconscious mind, and carried out in minutest detail."
- The power of words: "Jesus Christ taught that man's words played a leading part in the game of life. 'By your words ye are justified and by your words ye are condemned'." [Matthew 12:37]
- The Divine Pattern and Intuition: Shinn says that one must always ask for the "right" circumstance, or the "Divine selection," and not to ask for specifics.
- The Law of Substitution: According to Florence Scovel Shinn, sometimes our desires are misdirected: "Many people are in ignorance of their true destinies and are striving for things and situations which do not belong to them, and would only bring failure and dissatisfaction if attained."
- The Law of Karma: the Law of Karma is also known as the Law of Cause and Effect: "Whatsoever a man soweth that shall he also reap." This means that whatever man sends out in word or deed, will return to him; what he gives, he will receive.
- The Law of Non Resistance: The Law of Non Resistance may be considered a sensible corollary to the Law of Karma, i.e. do not react to a negative situation with more negativity, as that will bring back more harm down the track.
- The Law of Forgiveness: Though Karma is a powerful law, Shinn explains that the Law of Forgiveness or Grace is a higher law. "Christianity is founded upon the law of forgiveness - Christ has redeemed us from the curse of the Karmic law, and the Christ within each man is his Redeemer and Salvation from all inharmonious conditions."
- The Law of Use: Shinn explains that a gift is a better investment than a savings account. "Many people are in ignorance of the fact that gifts and things are investments, and that hoarding and saving invariably lead to loss."
- The Law of Love: Shinn quotes Jesus when she explains the importance of love. "Every man on this planet is taking his initiation in love. "A new commandment I give unto you, that ye love one another."

== Influences ==
Scovel Shinn's writing shares some common beliefs with Mary Baker Eddy, and there is some shared terminology. e.g. 'Infinite Spirit', 'Mortal Mind', 'Treatment', 'Demonstration' and 'Native Nothingness'. However her writing style is more familiar and less verbose than that of Mary Baker Eddy. As in Christian Science, Florence Scovel Shinn questions the reality of evil: "Jesus Christ said: "Resist not evil," for He knew in reality, there is no evil, therefore nothing to resist.

Also Scovel Shinn makes less of the illusion of matter, an argument that dominates Mary Baker Eddy's work Science and Health With Key to the Scriptures. Scovel Shinn's emphasis on the power of the spoken word may have been influenced by Emma Curtis Hopkins.

Florence Scovel's books are widely discussed and admired in Unity Churches around the globe.

== Books and writing ==
Unable to find a publisher for The Game of Life and How to Play It she published it herself in 1925. "Your Word is Your Wand" was published in 1928 and The Secret Door to Success was published in 1940 shortly before her death on October 17, 1940. The Power of the Spoken Word is a compendium of her notes, gathered by a student and published posthumously in 1945.

In 2014, "Your Word Is Your Wand" was released as an audiobook. The publisher was Hillary Hawkins Production LLC. The Game of Life and How To Play It audiobook was released in 2010 and again in 2015.
