= Raymond Charles Barker =

Raymond Charles Barker at Charter Ceremony, New Thought Long Island

Raymond Charles Barker (August 31, 1911 – January 26, 1988) was an author and leader of the New Thought spiritual movement, specifically in the Religious Science movement.

== Early life ==
Barker was born on August 31, 1911, in Rochester, New York to George Elbert Barker and Harriet Whitbeck Barker, Presbyterians who became interested in New Thought upon attending lectures about it. In 1916, both of his parents became actively involved with the Unity Church formed in Rochester that year, with Barker attending the Sunday school. During his teen years, Barker began assuming responsibilities at the church after school.

He became assistant minister of the Church of Universal Truth in Toledo, Ohio, then returned to the Rochester Unity Church, where he spoke Sundays and Wednesdays. In 1935, he began his formal studies one month each summer, from 1935 to 1938, at Unity Headquarters, Lee's Summit, Missouri. While still formally a student, he organized a Unity Church in Syracuse, New York. In June 1940, he was ordained at Unity School by Unity co-founder Charles Fillmore.

== Ministry ==
Later in 1940, Barker visited Los Angeles and met with Religious Science founder Ernest Holmes, who attracted Barker to Religious Science. In 1944, Barker accepted a co-ministry with Elizabeth Carrick-Cook at the San Francisco Institute of Religious Science.

He had first met Carrick-Cook at the 1940 International New Thought Alliance Congress that she and her Absolute Science Center hosted. It marked the beginning of a close friendship that introduced Barker to the teachings of the English metaphysician Frederick Lawrence Rawson, whose work in America had been continued by Carrick-Cook's late husband, Jay Williams Cook. Carrick-Cook merged her activity with Religious Science when Barker joined the newly formed Religious Science Institute in San Francisco.

Barker became President of the Religious Science Institute, and then resigned in 1945, at Holmes' request, to begin the formalization of a Religious Science ministry in New York City. On February 1, 1946, Barker founded the First Church of Religious Science in Manhattan. By 1949, services were being held at New York's town hall. Three years later, the new church acquired the building at 122 W. 55th St. In 1966, it moved from there to ownership of 14 East 48th St, around the corner from 5th Avenue. This space was too small to accommodate those attending Barker's meetings and classes, so arrangements were made in 1969 for the Church to hold its Sunday meetings at Alice Tully Hall in the Lincoln Center.

Barker also had a weekly program on New York City's metropolitan-area radio station WOR. Some of his students included future Religious Science leaders Stuart Grayson and Louise Hay. Barker was president of the International New Thought Alliance (1943–46) and Religious Science International (1954–57).

Dr. Barker was known for one of his books, God is Money, saying "Money is God in action, and it takes money to put God into action." Which was one of his founding tenants and he carried through his life.

== Retirement and death ==
Upon Dr. Barker's retirement from the ministry in 1979, he was succeeded by Stuart Grayson. Barker took up residence at Rancho Mirage, Calif., where he continued as a writer and guest speaker until his death on January 26, 1988. Memorial services were held for him at the New York and Palm Desert Churches of Religious Science. At the latter church, Robert Bitzer, founder of the Hollywood Church of Religious Science and one of the Religious Science movement's earliest workers and organizers, eulogized Dr. Barker as having done more for Religious Science than anyone since founder Ernest Holmes.

== Collected works ==
Title	ISBN	Year of Publication
Treat Yourself to Life	0875167004	1954
The Science of Successful Living	0875165362	1957
Power of Decision	0875166997	1968
365 Days of Richer Living: Daily Inspirations	0911336486	1973
Treat Yourself to Life (How to make your subconscious work for you)	0396035965	1976
Treatment: What It Is and How to Do It	0875165044	1985
Money is God in Action	0875165028	1985
How to Be Healthy, Wealthy, Happy	0875165788	1986
You Are Invisible	0875165761	1986
Spiritual Healing for Today	0875166075	1988
Collected Wisdom	1561700975	1994
Create the Life you Want:	0984304096	2013
The Science of Successful Living (Updated Edition)	0875168787	2014

== See also ==
- List of New Thought writers
- Religious Science
