= Global Religious Science Ministries =

Logo of the organization

Global Religious Science Ministries, or GRSM, is an organization representing the Religious Science denomination in the New Thought movement. Centers and churches in the United States, Canada, Central America, South America, Africa, Europe, India, Australia, and the Philippines are represented by the organization. It is headquartered in Arlington, Virginia.

== History ==
Dr. Robert Karle founded the Center for Creative Living and seminary in the Washington, D.C. area in 1977. In 1986 he started Global Religious Science Ministries for the purpose of credentialing Practitioners and Ministers of Religious Science/Science of Mind in the eastern United States, and specifically in the Washington, D.C. area. GRSM is a member of the International New Thought Alliance.

== Teaching and practice ==
RS/SOM teaches that all beings are expressions of and part of Infinite Intelligence, also known as Spirit, Christ Consciousness, or God. It teaches that, because God is all there is in the universe (not just present in Heaven, or in assigned deities, as believed by traditional teachings), Its power can be used by all humans to the extent that they recognize and align themselves with Its presence. Ernest Holmes said "God is not ... a person, but a Universal Presence ... already in our own soul, already operating through our own consciousness.”

The Introduction to "The Science of Mind" text describes "The Thing Itself" (God or Infinite Intelligence), "The Way It Works," "What It Does," and "How to Use It." Holmes taught that "Love rules through Law." (i.e. the Law of Mind or Cause and Effect) and "Love points the way and Law makes the way possible." The "Law of Cause and Effect" simply states that every action has a consequence — creative, destructive, or neutral. It can be described as Jesus Christ implied and what was also stated in parts of the Old Testament: you reap what you sow, the bread you cast upon the water comes back to you, and other expressions of that concept. The Law of Attraction is one aspect of that Law. It differs from the Hindu definition of karma in that it is not related to reincarnation and that it happens in this life. Personal responsibility is a major tenet of RS/SOM.

RS/SOM teaches that people can achieve more fulfilling lives through the practice called Spiritual Mind Treatment (Treatment), or Affirmative Prayer. Spiritual Mind Treatment is a step-by-step process, in which one states the desired outcome as if it has already happened. In that way, it differs from traditional prayer, since it does not ask an entity separate from itself to act. It declares human partnership with Infinite Intelligence to achieve success. Treatment is to be stated as personal (first person), positive, powerful (with feeling), and present (is happening right now). The goal is to gain clarity in thinking that guides action to be consistent with the desired outcome. The Treatment is believed to set off a new chain of causation in Mind that leads one to act according to the good for which one is treating. Spiritual Mind Treatment, as currently taught in RS/SOM centers, contains five steps: Recognition, Unification, Realization, Thanksgiving, and Release. Some adherents of RS/SOM also use supplemental meditation techniques, including "Visioning"

== Professional seminary ==
The Seminary is the educational component of GRSM. It offers classroom training and informal study groups. The Seminary includes all accredited full-time and part-time programs offered by its members. Most GRSM educational programs are part-time evening courses that follow an academic school year. The early courses in the series may be facilitated by practitioners or ministers. Practitioner and ministerial courses are led by ministers. Students enrolled in the doctorate program are assigned a sponsor.

== See also ==
- History of New Thought
