= Louise Hay =

American author (1926–2017)

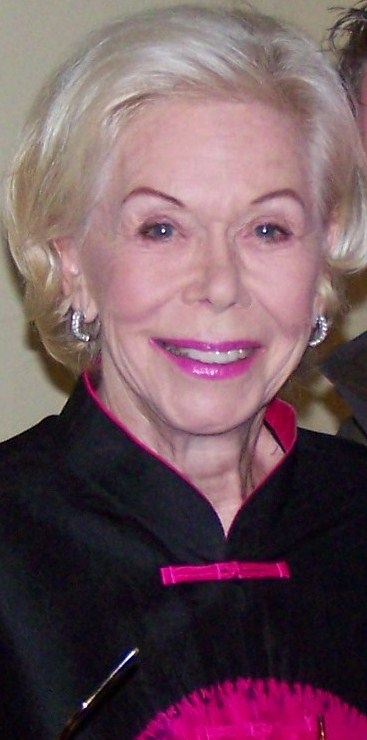
- Hay in 2008
- Born: Helen Vera Lunney; October 8, 1926; Los Angeles, California, U.S.
- Died: August 30, 2017 (aged 90); San Diego, California, U.S.
- Occupations: Author; publisher – Hay House; philanthropist – Hay Foundation; professional speaker
- Writing career
- Genres: Metaphysics, self-help, motivational
- Notable work: You Can Heal Your Life (1984)
- Website: www.louisehay.com

Louise Lynn Hay (October 8, 1926 – August 30, 2017) was an American motivational author and professional speaker. She authored several New Thought self-help books, including the 1984 book You Can Heal Your Life, and founded Hay House publishing.

== Early life ==
Hay was born Helen Vera Lunney in Los Angeles to Henry John Lunney (1901–1998) and Veronica Chwala (1894–1985), Hay recounted her life story in an interview with Mark Oppenheimer of The New York Times in May 2008.

In it, Hay stated that she was born in Los Angeles to a poor mother who remarried Louise's violent stepfather, Ernest Carl Wanzenreid (1903–1992), who physically abused her and her mother. When she was about five, she was raped by a neighbor. At 15, she dropped out of University High School in Los Angeles without a diploma, became pregnant and, on her 16th birthday, gave up her newborn baby girl for adoption.

She then moved to Chicago, where she worked in low-paying jobs. In 1950, she moved on again, to New York. At this point she changed her first name, and began a career as a fashion model. She achieved success, working for Bill Blass, Oleg Cassini, and Pauline Trigère. In 1954, she married the English businessman Andrew Hay (1928–2001); after 14 years of marriage, she felt devastated when he left her for another woman, Sharman Douglas (1928–1996).

== Career ==
Hay said that about this time she found the First Church of Religious Science on 48th Street, which taught her the transformative power of thought. Hay studied the New Thought works of "positive thinking" authors. One was Florence Scovel Shinn who believed that positive thinking could change people's material circumstances, and the other, Religious Science founder Ernest Holmes who taught that positive thinking could heal the body.

In the early 1970s Hay became a Religious Science practitioner. In this role she led people in spoken affirmations, which she believed would cure their illnesses, and became popular as a workshop leader. She also studied Transcendental Meditation with Maharishi Mahesh Yogi at Maharishi International University in Fairfield, Iowa.

Hay described how in 1977 or 1978 she was diagnosed with "incurable" cervical cancer, and how she came to the conclusion that by holding on to her resentment for her childhood abuse and rape she had contributed to its onset. She reported how she had refused conventional medical treatment, and began a regimen of forgiveness, coupled with therapy, nutrition, reflexology, and occasional colonic enemas. She said in the interview that she rid herself of the cancer by this method, but, while swearing to its truth, admitted that she had outlived every doctor who could confirm her story.

In 1976, Hay wrote and self-published her first book, Heal Your Body, which began as a small pamphlet containing a list of different bodily ailments and their "probable" metaphysical causes. This pamphlet was later enlarged and extended into her book You Can Heal Your Life, published in 1984. In February 2008, it was fourth on the New York Times paperback advice bestsellers list.

Around the same time she began "Hay Rides" by leading support groups for people living with HIV/AIDS. These grew from a few people in her living room to hundreds of men in a large hall in West Hollywood, California. Her work with AIDS patients drew fame and she was invited to appear on The Oprah Winfrey Show and The Phil Donahue Show in the same week, in March 1988. Following this, You Can Heal Your Life immediately landed on The New York Times bestseller list. More than 50 million copies sold around the world in over 30 languages and it also has been made into a movie. You Can Heal Your Life is also included in the book 50 Self-Help Classics for being significant in its field. It is often described as a part of the New Age movement.

Hay wrote that it has "... sold more than thirty-five million copies". It was announced in 2011 that You Can Heal your Life had reached 40 million sales. See page 225 of her book (December 2008 printing).

== Publishing house ==
In 1984, Hay established the Hay House publishing firm. In 1988 Reid Tracy joined the company as an accountant and would eventually become its CEO. The business flourished and attracted various writers. As of 2015 Hay House is the primary publisher of books and audio books by over 130 authors, including Deepak Chopra, as well as many books by Wayne Dyer. Hay House also publishes the teachings of "Abraham" as channeled through Esther Hicks.

== Legacy ==
In addition to running her publishing company, Hay ran a charitable organization called the Hay Foundation, which she founded in 1985. Its mission is to build futures and support organizations that enhance the quality of life for people, animals, and the environment.

In 2008, a movie about Louise Hay's life was released, titled You Can Heal Your Life. In Hay's own words on the film's official Web site: "This movie is the story of my life, my teachings, and how I've applied the principles of my teachings to my own life." The movie also features notable speakers and authors in the field of personal development including Gregg Braden, Wayne Dyer, Gay Hendricks, Esther and Jerry Hicks, and Doreen Virtue; it was directed by Emmy Award-winning director Michael A. Goorjian.

In the same year Louise Hay won a Minerva Award at The Women's Conference.

In September 2011, Hay and Cheryl Richardson released their book You Can Create An Exceptional Life.

The 2021 documentary film Another Hayride, built entirely from archival footage and narrated by writer/minister David Ault, explores how Louise drew hundreds of gay men with AIDS by teaching them self-love in 1980s Los Angeles.

== Criticism ==
Hay was best known for her 1984 book You Can Heal Your Life. In this book, Hay attributed various illnesses and medical conditions to psychological causes, or "mental patterns" including lack of self-love, fear, and guilt. For instance, Acne was due to “not accepting the self. Dislike of the self.”

In the mid-1980s, Hay became a prominent figure in the early HIV/AIDS crisis in the United States, offering support to people with HIV/AIDS. Hay began hosting support groups for people living with HIV/AIDS, mostly gay men, in West Hollywood in 1985. These meetings, known as "Hay Rides," eventually brought together more than 800 people at a time.

Hay has been accused of "brutal dismissal of actual people with AIDS" and profiting off of the sick by ruling out physiological factors that may be responsible for diseases and lending weight purely to mental causes that she perceives is the origin of diseases."

In the documentary Doors Opening: A Positive Approach to AIDS, Hay speaks about AIDS “remissions” and of not relying on medical care, saying, "You know, we’re not limited by the medical opinion. It depends whether we choose to do that or not.” Hay says, “I think it’s a terrible shame that at the moment the medical community is telling everyone that they have to die. Because it’s just not true, we know that’s not true. There are plenty of boys that are doing very well. You know, we can either buy into the fear or we cannot buy into the fear.”

American writer, activist, and AIDS historian Sarah Schulman wrote that Hay "made a lot of money exploiting desperate people with AIDS" as Hay’s publishing company, Hay House, made a reported $100 million in 2007 alone.

Peter Fitzgerald, an activist and filmmaker who witnessed Hay during this period said, “I understand that she provided hope at very dark times to a great many people, I also know all too well that her clay feet were deeply mired in the guilt of being an AIDS profiteer, a disloyal friend and purveyor of false hope.” Fitzgerald labelled Hay a "spiritual fraud" who "had let me and a great many of my people down.”

Beryl Satter, a history professor at Rutgers University with expertise in early New Age movements, says “What’s horrible about [touting benefits of relaxation and meditation] is if it prevents you from actually getting medical help, and that it so drastically turns the attention on your inner self and not the world around you.”

== Death ==
Hay died at her home in San Diego on August 30, 2017, at the age of 90.

== Ideas and teachings ==
Hay's two best-known books, Heal Your Body: The Mental Causes for Physical Illness and the Metaphysical Way to Overcome Them and You Can Heal Your Life, directly associate physical problems such as cancer with specific negative emotional patterns and assert that healing the emotional components will also heal the physical conditions. Hay wrote in You Can Heal Your Life that thoughts—not just sexual behavior—could help cause sexually transmitted diseases:

It is my belief that VENEREAL DISEASE is almost always sexual guilt. It comes from a feeling, often subconscious, that it is not right to express ourselves sexually. A carrier with a venereal disease can have many partners, but only those whose mental and physical immune systems are weak will be susceptible to it.

== Works ==
Hay's works include;

- You Can Heal Your Life. Hay House Inc., 1984. ISBN 0-937611-01-8
- Heal Your Body: The Mental Causes for Physical Illness and the Metaphysical Way to Overcome Them. Hay House Inc. (1984) ISBN 0-937611-35-2
- Mirror Work (1984)
- The AIDS Book: Creating a Positive Approach. Hay House Inc. (1988) ISBN 0-937611-32-8
- A Garden of Thoughts: My Affirmation Journal. Hay House Inc. (1989) ISBN 978-0937611678
- The Totality of Possibilities (1989)
- Receiving Prosperity: How to Attract Wealth, Success, and Love into Your Life (1989)
- The Power of Your Spoken Word (1990)
- Self-Esteem: Motivational Affirmations for Building Confidence and Recognizing Self-Worth (1990)
- Love Yourself, Heal Your Life Workbook. Hay House Inc. (1990)
- The Power Is Within You. Hay House Inc. (1991)
- Heart Thoughts. Hay House Inc., 1992 ISBN 978-1-4019-3720-1
- Loving Thoughts For Increasing Prosperity. Hay House Inc. (1993)
- I Can Do It (1993)
- Meditations to Heal Your Life (1994)
- 101 Power Thoughts (1994)
- Gratitude: A Way Of Life. Hay House Inc. (1996)
- Life! Reflections On Your Journey. Hay House Inc. (1996) ISBN 978-1561700929
- Living Perfect Love: Empowering Rituals For Women. Humantics MultiMedia Publishers (1996) ISBN 978-0-9652851-0-0
- Heal Your Body A–Z: The Mental Causes for Physical Illness and the Way to Overcome Them. Hay House Inc. (1998) ISBN 978-1561707928
- 101 Ways To Health And Healing. Hay House Inc. (1998) ISBN 978-1-56170-496-5
- Empowering Women: A Guide to Loving Yourself, Breaking Rules, and Bringing Good into Your Life (1996)
- Colors and Numbers (1998)
- Everyday Positive Thinking (2004)
- I Think, I Am!: Teaching Kids the Power of Affirmations (2008)
- Experience Your Good Now!: Learning to Use (2010)
- 21 Days to Master Affirmations (2011)
- You Can Create An Exceptional Life (2011)
- Painting the Future: A Tales of Everday Magic Novel (2012)
- All is Well: Heal your body. Carlsbad, US: Hay House. 2013. ISBN 978-1-4019-3502-3.
- Loving Yourself to Great Health: Thoughts & Food: the ultimate diet. [S.l.]: Hay House Inc. 2014. ISBN 978-1-4019-4284-7.
- Hay, Louise L.; Kessler, David (2014). You can heal your heart: finding peace after a breakup, divorce, or death. Hay House, Incorporated. ISBN 978-1-4019-4387-5. (with David Kessler)
- Life loves you: 7 spiritual experiments to heal your life. Hay House Inc. 2014. ISBN 978-1-4019-4614-2.
- The Bone Broth Secret: A Culinary Adventure in Health, Beauty, and Longevity (2018) (with Heather Dane)
- Trust Life: Love Yourself Every Day with Wisdom from Louise Hay (2018)

== See also ==
- Raymond Charles Barker
- Emmet Fox
- Stuart Grayson
- Florence Scovel Shinn
