= Ernest Holmes =

American spiritual writer

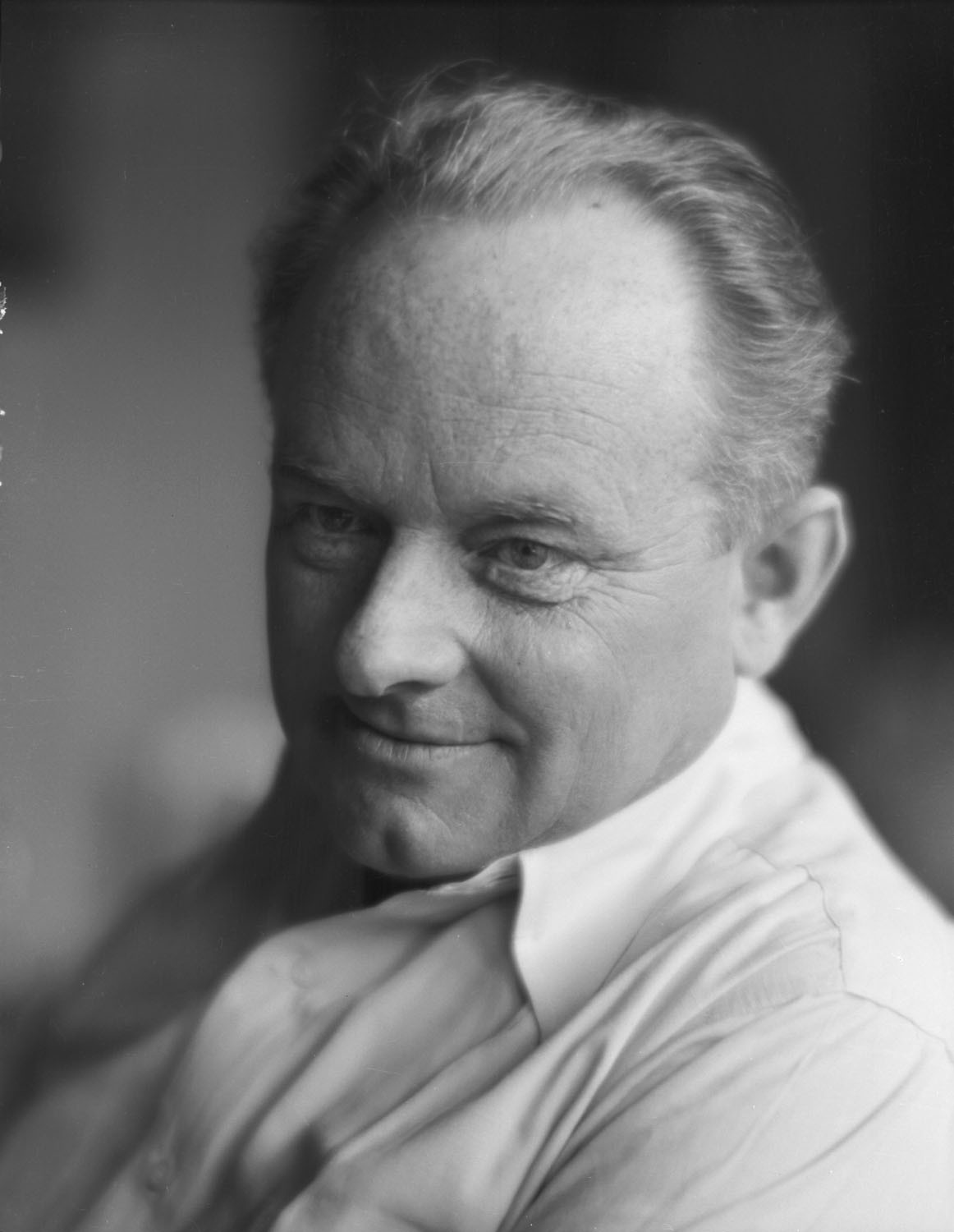
- Philosopher, Father of Science of Mind
- Born: Ernest Shurtleff Holmes; January 21, 1887; Lincoln, Maine
- Died: April 7, 1960 (aged 73); Los Angeles, California
- Occupations: Minister, philosopher, author
- Known for: Founder of the Religious Science
- Spouse: Hazel Durkee Foster

Ernest Shurtleff Holmes (January 21, 1887 – April 7, 1960) was an American New Thought writer, teacher, and leader. He was the founder of a spiritual movement known as Religious Science, part of the greater New Thought movement, whose spiritual philosophy is known as "The Science of Mind." He was the author of The Science of Mind and numerous other metaphysical books, and the founder of Science of Mind magazine, in continuous publication since 1927. His books remain in print, and the principles he taught as "Science of Mind" have inspired and influenced many generations of metaphysical students and teachers. Holmes had previously studied another New Thought teaching, Divine Science, and was an ordained Divine Science Minister. His influence beyond New Thought can be seen in the self-help movement.

== Biography ==
Holmes was born January 21, 1887, in Lincoln, Maine, to a poor family. He was the son of Anna Columbia (Heath) and William Nelson Holmes. He left school and his family in Maine for Boston at the age of 15. From 1908 to 1910 he worked in a store to pay for his tuition at the Leland Powers School of Expression in Boston. There he was introduced to Mary Baker Eddy's Science and Health, as well as Christian Science.

In 1912 Holmes joined his brother Fenwicke in Venice, California. In addition to taking up a job with the city government, Holmes and his brother, a Congregationalist minister, studied the writings of Thomas Troward, Ralph Waldo Emerson, William Walker Atkinson, and Christian D. Larson.

In 1927 Holmes married Hazel Durkee Foster. She died in 1957. He died on April 7, 1960.

=== Religious Science/Science of Mind ===
After leading small private meetings throughout the city, in 1916 Holmes was invited to speak at the Metaphysical Library in Los Angeles. This led him to repeat engagements, and on a nationwide tour. In 1919 he published his first book, The Creative Mind, and after almost a decade of touring, Holmes committed to remaining in the L.A. area to complete his major work, The Science of Mind. It was published in 1926.

That year Holmes started speaking each Sunday morning in a theatre in the Ambassador Hotel that seated 625. In November 1927, they moved to the 1,295-seat Ebell Theatre. Subsequently, Holmes' lectures continued moving to ever-larger spaces, including the Biltmore Hotel, and the Wiltern Theatre, which seats more than 2800. In February 1927, Holmes incorporated the Institute of Religious Science and School of Philosophy, Inc., and later that year he began publishing Science of Mind magazine. In 1935 he reincorporated his organization as the Institute of Religious Science and Philosophy, and in 1954 it was reestablished again as a religious organization called the Church of Religious Science.

Today his Science of Mind/Religious Science teachings are continued by the Centers for Spiritual Living, the Affiliated New Thought Network, the Global Religious Science Ministries, Independent Religious Science ministries, and other organizations. In 2015, his books Creative Mind and Creative Mind and Success were narrated by Hillary Hawkins and published in audiobook form.

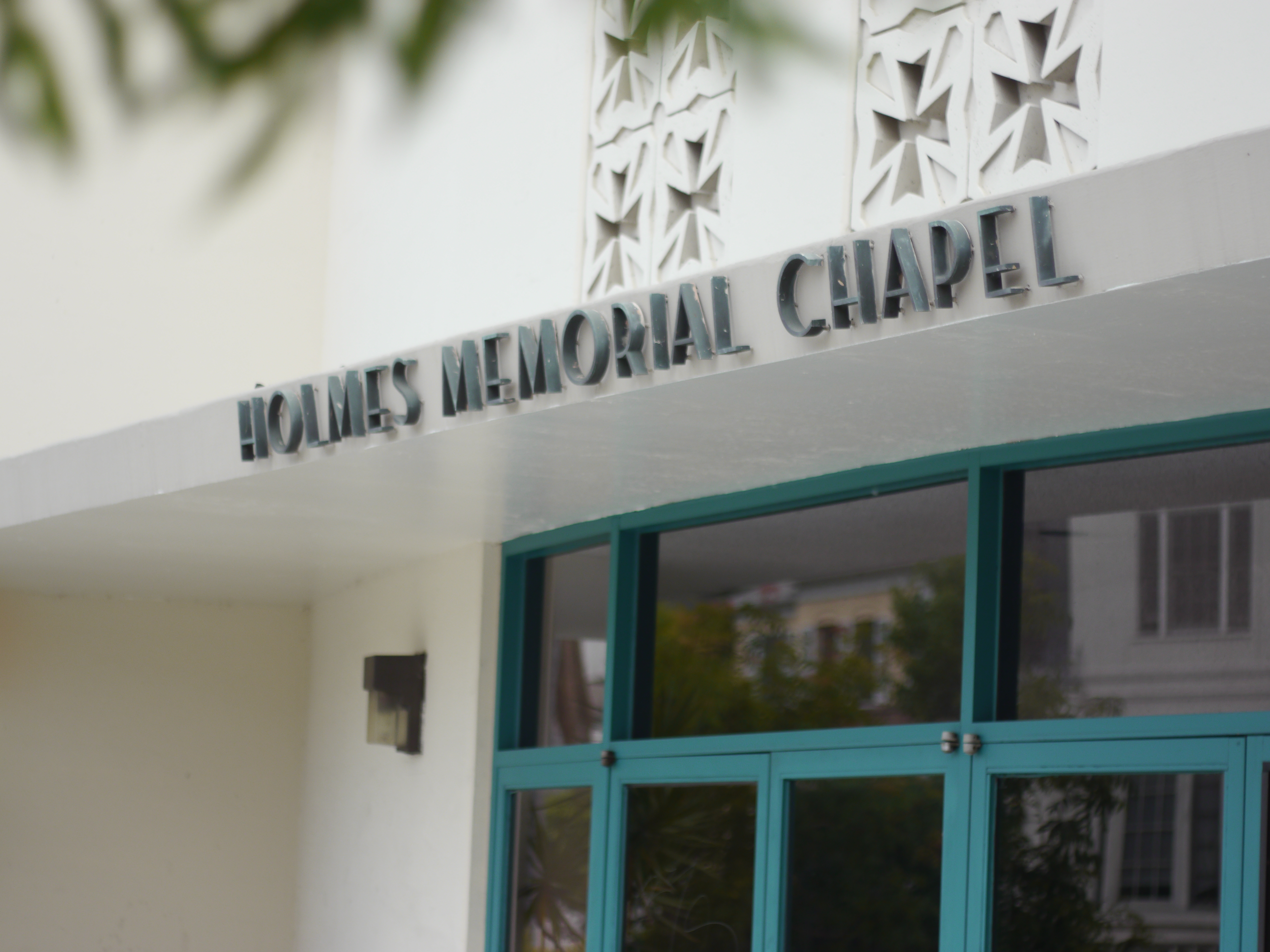
Holmes Memorial Chapel at Founder's Church in Los Angeles

== Philosophy ==
Holmes taught New Thought in a Christian context in his church. The primary teaching of New Thought is that physical form is created by a Universal Mind, or God, which manifests—or literally reflects—the dominant belief system of all living persons. In his book, The Science of Mind, Holmes described this God-force as follows:

There is a Universal Mind, Spirit, Intelligence, that is the origin of everything: It is First Cause. It is God. This Universal Life and Energy finds an outlet in and through all that is energized, and through everything that lives.

Holmes argued that human beings have access to the power of this Universal Mind by directing their thoughts—in particular, their beliefs about the present or the future. In his book, he described this as follows:

Experience has taught us that the subjective tendency of this intelligent Law of creative force may consciously be directed and definitively used. This is the greatest discovery of all time.

In his book, The Science of Mind, Holmes explains how it is possible to direct this power by controlling one's thoughts. A sustained belief in a particular outcome will invariably create that outcome. In other words, good events proceed from a belief in good. Evil events proceed from a belief in evil. In The Science of Mind, Holmes emphasized the importance of only focusing on good:

Never look at that which you do not wish to experience. No matter what the false condition may be, it must be refuted. The proper kind of denial is based upon the recognition that, in reality, there is no limitation, for Mind can as easily make a planet as an acorn. The Infinite knows no difference between a million dollars and a penny. It only knows that IT IS.

In order to get results, Holmes emphasized that it was necessary to think one specific thought, with complete certainty. If one is continually thinking different thoughts, the Universal Mind will not have a dominant belief that it can manifest, or create, in the physical world. Holmes explained this idea as follows, in his book, Creative Mind:

So plastic is mind, so receptive, that the slightest thought makes an impression upon it. People who think many kinds of thought must expect to receive a confused manifestation in their lives. If a gardener plants a thousand kinds of seeds, he will get a thousand kinds of plants; it is the same in mind.

== Statement of Beliefs ==
In the 1920s, Holmes published the following statement of beliefs:

- I believe in God, the Living Spirit Almighty; one, indestructible, absolute and self-existent Cause. This One manifests itself in and through all creation, but is not absorbed by its creation. The manifest universe is the body of God; it is the logical and necessary outcome of the infinite self-knowingness of God.
- I believe in the incarnation of the Spirit in all, and that we are all incarnations of the One Spirit. I believe in the eternality, the immortality, and the continuity of the individual soul, forever and ever expanding.
- I believe that Heaven is within me and that I experience It to the degree that I become conscious of it.
- I believe the ultimate goal of life to be a complete emancipation from all discord of every nature, and that this goal is sure to be attained by all.
- I believe in the unity of all life, and that the highest God and the innermost God is one God.
- I believe that God is personal to all who feel this indwelling Presence.
- I believe in the direct revelation of Truth through my intuitive and spiritual nature, and that anyone may become a revealer of Truth who lives in close contact with the indwelling God.
- I believe that the Universal Spirit, which is God, operates through a Universal Mind, which is the Law of God; and that I am surrounded by this Creative Mind which receives the direct impress of my thought and acts upon it.
- I believe in the healing of the sick through the power of the Mind. I believe in the control of conditions through the power of the Mind. I believe in the eternal Goodness, the eternal Loving-kindness and the eternal Givingness of Life to all.
- I believe in my own soul, my own spirit, and my own destiny; for I understand that the life I live is God. Amen. And So It Is.

Through his research, Holmes created a "structure of concepts" based on the religions and philosophies of human history, sometimes correlating his findings with the then-emerging "new" physics. He named the teaching a science because he believed that its principles were scientifically provable in practice. He wrote, "I would rather see a student of this Science prove its Principle than to have him repeat all the words of wisdom that have ever been uttered."

Holmes ultimately came to believe in a "core concept" – what he saw as a "Golden thread of truth" that ran through all of the world's religions as well as in science and philosophy.

== Recognition ==
Holmes received a variety of recognitions for his work. In 1945, he was awarded the honorary degree of Doctor of Philosophy by Andhra University in India. The California College of Medicine, and the Foundation Academic University of Spiritual Understanding in Venice, Italy, awarded him a Doctor of Letters. In 1942, he was bestowed with the Cross of the Commander of the Grand Humanitarian Prize of Belgium, and in 1944 he was named an honorary member of the Eugene Field Society.

== Bibliography ==
- Creative Mind; a series of talks on mental and spiritual law delivered at the Metaphysical Institute, Los Angeles, California, U.S.A., in the year nineteen hundred eighteen. New York: R.M. McBride & Co. 1919.
- Creative Mind and Success. 1922.
- The Science of Mind; a complete course of lessons in the science of mind and spirit. New York: R.M. McBride & Co. 1922.
- This Thing Called You. Los Angeles: Tarcher. 2007.
- Living the Science of Mind. Camarillo, California: DeVorss & Company. 1991.
- The Hidden Power of the Bible. Los Angeles: Tarcher. 2006. (Originally published in 1926 as The Bible in Light of Science of Mind.)
- 365 Science of Mind: A Year of Daily Wisdom from Ernest Holmes. Los Angeles: Tarcher. 2007.
- How to Change Your Life: An Inspirational, Life-Changing Classic from the Ernest Holmes Library. Deerfield Beach, Florida: HCI. 1999.
- Prayer: How to Pray Effectively. Los Angeles: Tarcher. 2007
- Love and Law. Los Angeles: Tarcher. 2004

== See also ==
- Uell Stanley Andersen
- Raymond Charles Barker
- Joseph Sieber Benner
- Emmet Fox
- Stuart Grayson
- Hillary Hawkins
- Louise Hay
- Fenwicke Holmes
- Emma Curtis Hopkins
- A. K. Mozumdar
- Florence Scovel Shinn
- List of New Thought denominations and independent centers

== Biographies ==
- Armor, R. C., R. Llast and A. Vergara (2000), That was Ernest: The story of Ernest Holmes and the Religious Science movement. DeVorss Publications.
- Holmes, F. L. (1970), Ernest Holmes: His life and times. Dodd and Mead Publishers.
