= Hornaday =

Hornaday is a surname. Notable people with the surname include:

- Ann Hornaday (1960–2026), American film critic
- Jeffrey Hornaday, American choreographer and film director
- Mary J. Hornaday (1906–1982), American journalist
- Ron Hornaday Sr. (1931–2008), American racer
- Ron Hornaday Jr. (born 1958), NASCAR Camping World Truck Series driver
- Ronnie Hornaday, American racer
- William Hornaday, American minister
- William Temple Hornaday, American zoologist

== See also ==
- Hornaday River, a river in Canada
