= Gay Hendricks =

American psychologist (born 1945)

- Born: January 20, 1945 (age 81); Leesburg, Florida, U.S.

Gay Hendricks (born January 20, 1945) is an American psychologist, writer, and teacher in the field of personal growth, relationships, and body intelligence. He is best known for his work in relationship enhancement and in the development of conscious breathing exercises. After receiving his Ph.D. in psychology from Stanford University in 1974, Hendricks began teaching at the University of Colorado. He spent 21 years at the University of Colorado and became a full professor in the Counseling Psychology Department while founding The Hendricks Institute. He conducts workshops with his wife of nearly 40 years, Dr. Kathlyn Hendricks. Together they have authored over 35 books. They have appeared on numerous radio and television shows, including an interview with radio host Jean Chatzky.

Hendricks co-founded The Spiritual Cinema Circle with his wife and producer Stephen Simon, and was Executive Producer for the film Zen Noir (2004). He served as producer and writer on the Louise Hay movie, You Can Heal Your Life. In 2011, he partnered with writer Tinker Lindsey to begin the Tenzing Norbu mystery series, with titles such as The First Rule of Ten and The Second Rule of Ten, which illustrate emotional and spiritual challenges in the life of a fictional ex-monk private detective. A short biopic was made of his life for Polish television, wherein he was portrayed by Canadian actor, Jon Cubbon.

== Partial bibliography ==
- Christmas full of miracles.
- The Centering Book, with Russel Wills. Prentice Hall, 1975. ISBN 978-0-13-122184-0
- Learning to Love Yourself: A Guide to Becoming Centered. Atria Books, 1982. ISBN 978-0-671-76393-0
- Radiance! Breathwork, Movement and Body-Centered Psychotherapy, with Kathlyn Hendricks. Wingbow Press, 1991. ISBN 978-0-914728-72-6
- Centering and the Art of Intimacy, with Kathlyn Hendricks. Simon & Schuster, 1992. ISBN 978-0-671-76213-1
- Conscious Loving: The Journey to Co-Commitment, with Kathlyn Hendricks. Bantam Books, 1992. ISBN 978-0-553-35411-9
- At the Speed of Life, with Kathlyn Hendricks. Bantam Books, 1994. ISBN 978-0-553-37381-3
- Conscious Breathing: Breathwork for Health, Stress Release, and Personal Mastery. Bantam Books, 1995. ISBN 978-0-553-37443-8
- The Corporate Mystic: A Guidebook for Visionaries with Their Feet on the Ground, with Kate Ludeman. Bantam Books, 1997. ISBN 978-0-553-37494-0
- The Conscious Heart: Seven Soul-Choices that Create Your Relationship Destiny, with Kathlyn Hendricks. Bantam Books, 1999. ISBN 978-0-553-37491-9
- Conscious Living: How to Create a Life of Your Own Design. HarperCollins, 2001. ISBN 978-0-06-251487-5
- Achieving Vibrance. Three Rivers Press, 2001. ISBN 978-0-609-80939-6
- Breathing Ecstasy: Finding Sexual Bliss Using the Incredible Power of Breath, with Kathlyn Hendricks. Three Rivers Press, 2003. ISBN 978-0-609-80938-9
- Conscious Golf. Rodale Books, 2003. ISBN 978-1-57954-693-9
- Lasting Love: The 5 Secrets of Growing a Vital, Conscious Relationship, with Kathlyn Hendricks. Rodale Books, 2004. ISBN 978-1-57954-832-2
- Spirit-Centered Relationships, with Kathlyn Hendricks. Hay House, 2005. ISBN 978-1-4019-0887-4
- Five Wishes: How Answering One Simple Question Can Make Your Dreams Come True. New World Library, 2007. ISBN 978-1-57731-598-8
- Attracting Genuine Love, with Kathlyn Hendricks. Sounds True, 2009. ISBN 978-1-59179-705-0
- The Big Leap: Conquer Your Hidden Fear and Take Life to the Next Level. HarperOne, 2009. ISBN 978-0-06-173534-9
- The First Rule of Ten: A Tenzing Norbu Mystery, with Tinker Lindsey. Hay House, 2011. ISBN 978-1-4019-3776-8
- Conscious Luck: Eight Secrets to Intentionally Change Your Fortune. St. Martin's, 2020. ISBN 9781250622945
