= William Hornaday =

American minister

William H. D. Hornaday (26 April 1910 – 17 March 1992), affectionately known as "Dr. Bill" to his congregation of over 7,000, was the leading minister at Founder's Church of Religious Science in Los Angeles, California. A former business executive, Hornaday earned his Doctor of Divinity in 1952 and studied under Carl Jung, Albert Schweitzer, Karl Barth, Reinhold Niebuhr, and Ernest Holmes.

His daily inspirational radio program, "This Thing Called Life," aired starting in the 1970s in Southern California, and worldwide via the Armed Forces Radio Service.

Books he has written include My Prayer For You, Today; Life Everlasting; Success Unlimited; Help For Today (with Ernest Holmes); and Your Aladdin's Lamp (with Harlan Ware).

Hornaday is considered one of the leaders of the New Thought Movement, and has declared that his denomination, Religious Science, "is Christian, and more, because we study and revere the teachings of the masters of all ages, the truths of all religions."

In 1976, Hornaday was awarded an honorary Doctor of Divinity (D.D.) degree from Whittier College.
