= African American Short Films =

African American Short Films is an American television show. It is the only nationally televised program, in first-run syndication, featuring short films starring, produced, written or directed by African American filmmakers. The show has received several Telly Awards.

African American Short Films began airing in 2002 as a one-hour quarterly television special in first-run syndication. The program was created by veteran television producer Frank Badami.

== Shorts ==
The short film Window, starring Louis Gossett Jr. was included in the program in 2007.

The short film Stuck for a Reason, starring actress, writer, producer Hillary Hawkins was included in the program in 2015.
