= The Sermon on the Mount (book) =

1934 book by Emmet Fox

The Sermon on the Mount: A General Introduction to Scientific Christianity in the Form of a Spiritual Key to Matthew V, VI, and VII
- Title page for The Sermon on the Mount: A General Introduction to Scientific Christianity in the Form of a Spiritual Key to Matthew V, VI, and VII (1934)
- Author: Emmet Fox
- Language: English
- Subject: Spirituality, Christian mysticism, New Thought
- Publisher: Harper & Brothers
- Publication date: 1934
- Publication place: United States
- Pages: 199

The Sermon on the Mount: A General Introduction to Scientific Christianity in the Form of a Spiritual Key to Matthew V, VI, and VII is a book written by Emmet Fox in 1934, which provides a spiritual interpretation of the Sermon on the Mount found in the Gospel of Matthew. Fox's book delves into the teachings of Jesus, emphasizing their relevance to personal and spiritual development in the context of New Thought philosophy.

== Themes ==
The book covers several core themes of the Sermon on the Mount, including:

1. The Beatitudes: Interpretation of the blessings described at the beginning of the Sermon on the Mount.
2. Spiritual Law: Discussion on the laws of life and the universe, suggesting that spiritual understanding can lead to practical daily benefits.
3. The Power of Thought: Emphasizes the idea that thoughts shape reality, a common theme in New Thought.
4. Forgiveness and Love: Explains the importance of unconditional love and forgiveness as taught by Jesus.
5. Prayer and Faith: Offers insights into the nature of effective prayer and living a life of faith.

== Reception ==
The Sermon on the Mount has been highly influential in the field of spiritual and self-help literature, praised for its practical approach to Christianity and its alignment with the principles of New Thought.

== Legacy ==
The ideas presented in The Sermon on the Mount continue to resonate with modern spiritual seekers and are often cited in discussions about the integration of New Thought principles with traditional Christian beliefs. Notably, Fox's teachings have had a significant impact on the Alcoholics Anonymous (AA) movement. Fox's secretary in New York was the mother of one of the men who worked closely with AA cofounder Bill W., which led to early AA groups attending Fox's lectures. The Sermon on the Mount became especially popular within AA, influencing its spiritual framework.
