= Catherine Ponder =

American New Thought leader

Catherine Ponder (born February 14, 1927) is an American minister and founder of Unity Church Worldwide, affiliated with the Unity Church, and author of several New Thought books focused mainly on the theme of prosperity.

== Early life ==
Ponder was born in Hartsville, South Carolina.

After studying business she enrolled in the Unity Ministerial School, receiving a Bachelor of Science in Education in 1956.

== Career ==
She was ordained as a Unity Church minister in 1958, with an initial ministry in Birmingham, Alabama (1958–61). She founded ministries in Austin, Texas (1961–69), San Antonio (1969–73) and Palm Desert, California in 1973, where she remains minister.

Ponder has written more than a dozen books, which include such bestsellers as her Millionaires of the Bible series.

Ponder wrote her first prosperity book The Dynamic Laws of Prosperity in the early 1960s while living in Birmingham, Alabama.

She has given lectures on the universal principles of prosperity in most of the major cities of America, as well as in smaller ones. Ponder has given interviews on television and radio, as well as numerous interviews by the print media.

Ponder's The Dynamic Laws of Prosperity was included among 50 'success classics' in an eponymous book by personal development scholar Tom Butler-Bowdon. Her Open Your Mind To Prosperity was separately featured in his book 50 Prosperity Classics.

== Personal life ==
While finishing The Dynamic Laws, she married and moved to the southwest, where her husband taught at the University of Texas. Following her husband's death, she moved to San Antonio in the early 1970s. She remarried and wrote a sequel to the first book, entitled Open Your Mind to Prosperity.

== Bibliography ==
- The Dynamic Laws of Prosperity (1962, released in French in 1980 by Les Éditions Un monde différent))
- The Prosperity Secrets of the Ages (1964)
- The Dynamic Laws of Healing (1966)
- The Healing Secrets of the Ages (1967)
- Pray and Grow Rich (1968)
- Open Your Mind To Prosperity (1971)
- The Millionaires of Genesis (1976)
- The Millionaire Moses (1977)
- The Millionaire Joshua (1978)
- The Millionaire from Nazareth (1979)
- Open Your Mind To Receive (1983, 2008. Released in French in 1997 by Les Éditions Un monde différent)
- Secret of Unlimited Prosperity (1983)
- The Prospering Power of Prayer (1983)
- Dare to Prosper! (1983)
- The Dynamic Laws of Prayer (1987)
- A Prosperity Love Story: Rags to Enrichment (memoir) (2003). DeVorss & Company. pp. 224 ISBN 978-0875167879
- Giving Thanks: The Art of Tithing by Paula Langguth Ryan (foreword by Catherine Ponder) (2005) ISBN 978-1889605074
- The Prospering Power of Love (2006 Revised & Updated)
- The Art of Tithing: Harness the Power of Giving Thanks and Create Lasting Inner and Outer Wealth by Paula Langguth Ryan (foreword by Catherine Ponder) (2021) ISBN 172250563X
