= You Can Heal Your Life =

1984 book by Louise Hay

- First edition
- Author: Louise Hay
- Language: English
- Subject: Self-help, spirituality
- Publisher: Hay House
- Publication date: January 1, 1984
- Publication place: USA
- ISBN: 0937611018
- Preceded by: Heal Your Body (1984)
- Followed by: A Garden of Thoughts: My Affirmation Journal

You Can Heal Your Life is a 1984 self-help and New Thought book by Louise Hay. It was the second book by the author, after Heal Your Body which she wrote at age 60. After Hay appeared on The Oprah Winfrey Show and Donahue in the same week in March 1988, the book appeared on the New York Times Best Seller list, and by 2008, over 35 million copies worldwide had been sold in over 30 languages, becoming one of the best-selling non-fiction book of all time. The book was also instrumental in the success of her publishing company, Hay House Inc. Due to the book, she is "one of the best-selling authors in history", and one of largest selling women authors, after J. K. Rowling, Danielle Steel and Barbara Cartland.

== Premise ==
The key premise of the book is that because the mind and body are connected, illnesses of the body somehow have their root causes in emotional and spiritual aspects of the mind and its beliefs and thought processes. While modern medicine concerns itself with eliminating symptoms of disease in the body, using tools such as chemotherapy and other pharmaceutical drugs and various surgical techniques, Hay's approach is to identify and work to resolve what she perceives as the mental root causes of disease. Hay believes that the causes of "dis-ease" include stress and unhealthy thought patterns and beliefs about oneself, and postulates that the most fundamental way to effect positive change in the body is to change the way we think, using tools such as "mirror work" and affirmations. At the end of the book, a separate section lists numerous illnesses and various emotional thought patterns that Hay believes causes them; this was derived from Hay's earlier book, Heal Your Body, which had its origins in a pamphlet she published in 1979.

== Film adaptation ==
In 2007, the book was adapted into a documentary film of the same name, with a screenplay written by Gay Hendricks and directed by Michael A. Goorjian.

== Controversy ==
The theories described in this book have been criticized as groundless by proponents of evidence based medicine. Specific passages within Hay's book appear to be medically inaccurate. For example, the below quotation appears to falsely claim that migraine headaches are purely psychosomatic:

"Headaches come from invalidating the self . . . Forgive yourself, let it go, and the headache will dissolve back into the nothingness from where it came . . . Migraine headaches are created by people who want to be perfect and who create a lot of pressure on themselves. A lot of suppressed anger is involved..."

Hay has also been criticized for 'blaming the victim' by suggesting that people with AIDS are causing their own illness due to poor mental attitude, and for claiming for decades that positive attitude can defeat AIDS, despite not being able to demonstrate any examples of this happening. According to a Slate article, some people have accused Hay of "brutal dismissal of actual people with AIDS" and profiting off of the sick by ruling out physiological factors that may be responsible for diseases and lending weight purely to mental causes that she perceives is the origin of diseases.

== See also ==
- New thought
- Self help
- Metaphysics
