= Perry Joseph Green =

American preacher of the New Thought Movement

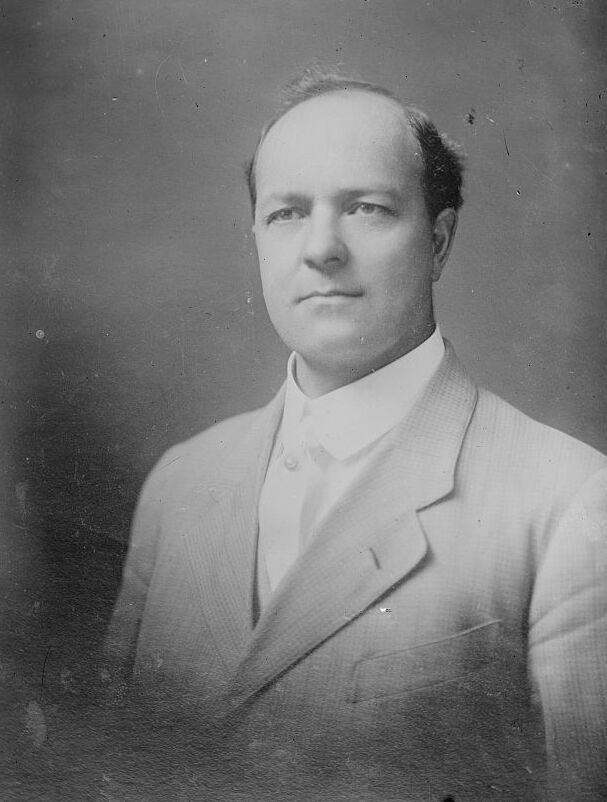
Green circa 1913

Perry Joseph Green of Portland, Oregon was a philosopher and preacher of the New Thought Movement in the early 1900s. He worked with other New Thought individuals such as Annie Rix Militz and Harriet Hale Rix.

== Publications ==
- Pre-natal and post-natal culture: for the development of the greatest possibilities in the on-coming generation, physiologically, psychologically and spiritually considered (1916)
