= Emmet Fox =

American New Thought writer (1886–1951)

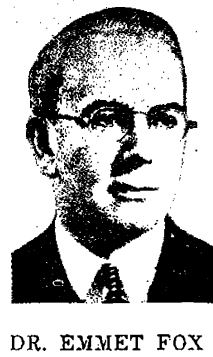
- Born: Joseph Emmett Fox; July 30, 1886; Cobh, County Cork, Ireland
- Died: August 13, 1951 (aged 65); Paris, France
- Education: St Ignatius' College

Emmet Fox (30 July 1886 – 13 August 1951) was an Irish New Thought spiritual leader of the early 20th century, primarily through the years of the Great Depression until his death in 1951. Fox's large Divine Science church services were held in New York City. He is today considered a spiritual godparent of Alcoholics Anonymous.

== Biography ==
Fox was born in Ireland. His father, Joseph Francis Fox, who died when Fox was still in his teens, was a physician and Member of Parliament.

Fox attended St Ignatius' College, a Jesuit secondary school near Stamford Hill. He became an electrical engineer.

He studied New Thought from the time of his late teens. He came to know the prominent New Thought writer Thomas Troward. Fox attended the London meeting at which the International New Thought Alliance was organized in 1914. He gave his first New Thought talk in Mortimer Hall in London in 1928.

Soon he went to the United States, and in 1931 was selected to become the successor to James Murray as the minister of New York's Divine Science Church of the Healing Christ. Fox became immensely popular, and spoke to large church audiences during the Depression, holding weekly services for up to 5,500 people at the New York Hippodrome until 1938 and subsequently at Carnegie Hall.

He was ordained in the Divine Science branch of New Thought. While on a visit abroad, he died at the American Hospital of Paris on August 13, 1951.

== Connection to Alcoholics Anonymous ==
Fox's secretary in New York was the mother of one of the men who worked with AA cofounder Bill W. Partly as a result of this connection, early AA groups often went to hear Fox.

His writing, especially The Sermon on the Mount, became popular in AA. Several pamphlets "The Golden Key," and "The Seven Main Aspects of God" are also widely read.

== Bibliography ==
Books

- Alter Your Life. (1931) ISBN 0-06-250897-0
- Power Through Constructive Thinking. (1932) ISBN 0-06-062861-8
- The Sermon on the Mount: The Key to Success in Life. (1934) ISBN 0-06-062862-6
- Find and Use Your Inner Power. (1937) ISBN 0-06-250407-X
- Make Your Life Worthwhile. (1942) ISBN 0-06-062913-4
- Around the Year with Emmet Fox: A Book of Daily Readings. (1952) ISBN 0-06-250408-8
- Stake Your Claim: Exploring the Gold Mine Within. (1952) ISBN 0-06-250537-8
- The Ten Commandments. (1953) ISBN 0-06-250307-3
- Diagrams for Living : The Bible Unveiled. (1968) ISBN 0-06-250335-9

Booklet

- The Mental Equivalent: The Secret of Demonstration. (1943) ISBN 1603865942

Pamphlet

- The Seven Day Mental Diet : How to Change Your Life in a Week. (1935) ISBN 0-87516-738-1

== See also ==
- Divine Science
- List of New Thought writers
- Religious Science
- Unity Church
