= Hillary Hawkins =

American actress

Hillary Hawkins is an American actress. She introduced shows such as Dora the Explorer, Bob the Builder, and Little Bill on TV everyday as Robyn, Host of the Nick Jr. block. She also was a Host for Radio Disney.

== Career ==
=== Early roles ===
As a child actress, she played Kate on an episode of Nickelodeon's Are You Afraid of the Dark? ("The Tale of the Jagged Sign"), the singing voice of Vanessa on Nickelodeon's Gullah Gullah Island and Keisha on New York Undercover. Hillary also was Jennifer in a series of Eikaiwa Challenge videos by Berlitz in Japan.

=== 2000s ===
Hawkins was the host of the Nick Jr. Channel After introducing shows such as Dora the Explorer, Bob the Builder and Little Bill on TV everyday as Robyn, Host of Nick Jr., Hillary became a Host for Radio Disney.

=== 2010s ===
Hawkins is an actress, screenwriter, producer of Stuck For a Reason, aired on ABC, CBS, NBC and FOX on African American Short Films. She is also actress, screenwriter, producer of A Pill for Two and winner Best Actress Award in a Drama.

The film is based on Hawkins' full-length play Jaded The Musical which was produced at The Secret Theatre in 2013 and developed at Scratch Night at Theatre for the New City in 2012. In addition to being playwright, lyricist, composer of Jaded The Musical, Hawkins is playwright of Sherri, developed in the Women's Work Project, produced by New Perspectives Theatre Company.

Hawkins is a voice actress that has been nominated for 3 Voice Arts Awards: Outstanding Audiobook Narration – Teens (2014), Metaphysical Best Voiceover (2015) and Author Performance, Best Voiceover (2018.) From 2013 to 2018, Hawkins narrated over 100 audiobooks including Your Word Is Your Wand and The Game of Life and How to Play It by Florence Scovel Shinn, Creative Mind and Creative Mind And Success by Ernest Holmes and Feeling is the Secret and At Your Command by Neville Goddard. She also narrated several books of the Bible.

On August 26, 2017, Hawkins voiced Annia Antoninus on the conceptual album 20s A Difficult Age by Marcus Orelias. In 2017, Ronimo Games released Awesomenauts Soundtrack – Dizzy Character Theme with vocals by Hillary Hawkins. Voice Actress Hawkins performed numerous voiceovers for clients such as Lego, Disney, Make-A-Wish Foundation, Scholastic, ADRA, DCCC, American Red Cross and UNICEF.

In addition to being an actress, Hawkins is a martial artist with a black belt in Karate. Actress martial artist Hawkins is the female martial artist in the black karate gi with a black belt striking in the 2017 Star Wars Target Commercial.

In 2018, Hillary worked as an ADR Voice Match on the film Acrimony directed by Tyler Perry.

On January 18, 2019, Hillary Hawkins released The Case Files. Hawkins who is the creator, animation writer, director, producer, artist, animator and voice actress for the animated drama series refers to the show as a "Child Protective Series." Hawkins previously worked in Child Protective Services, like the animated character she created named Hope.

On February 7, 2019, Hawkins released Heart2Heart, an American animated series and cartoon music group that sings children's songs, jazz songs and love songs. Hawkins is creator, singer, songwriter, composer, director, voice actress, artist and producer of the cartoon musical.

=== 2020s ===
In 2020, in addition to continuing her work as an international voice actor and New Thought narrator of spiritual self-development books such as Science of Mind, New Thought Theatre, Morning & Evening Thoughts for the Soul, 31 Days of Wisdom and From Passion to Peace, actress singer songwriter Hawkins released new music and music videos.

April 8, 2020, "Focus on the Good Things" by Christian Music Artist Hawkins was released as a music video.

April 17, 2020, "Protect" by Christian Singer Songwriter Hawkins was released as a music video.

April 28, 2020, Hawkins who was previously on air talent for WEIB 106.3 Smooth FM released an album Sweet Dreams. The album, which includes songs such as "Protect", "Good Sleep Tonight" & "Your Love Is" has been called "easy listening", "soothing", "meditation".

May 12, 2020, the singer songwriter released a music video for "I Picked You", a song from her previous album "Unrequited Love."

May 15, 2020, Hawkins released another music video "Through The River", a jazz and blues song on the album. "Through The River" song was created by Anthony J. Dixon (creator of "Futurology the Musical") & actress singer songwriter Hillary Hawkins who previously starred in "Futurology" Off-Broadway.

May 29, 2020, female Rapper Hillary Hawkins released a single "Where Are The True Christians?”

June 4, 2020, female rapper Hillary Hawkins released music video and single "Black Lives Matter".

September 1, 2020 Christian Hip Hop Artist Hawkins released "Love Back In Your Heart."

September 3, 2020 Hawkins released Love Lessons 101 a Christian Hip Hop Album. She is singer, rapper, songwriter of all songs on the album.

== Education ==
Hawkins attended Professional Children's School and has a dual BA in Spanish and creative writing from Smith College.

== Filmography ==
=== Film work ===
Year	Film	Credited as				
Year	Film	Actress	Writer	Producer	ADR	Role
1995	Dead Man Walking				Yes	adr loop group (child voice actor)
2007	Honeydripper				Yes	adr loop group (voice actress)
2007	Noise				Yes	adr loop group (voice actress)
2009	Brooklyn's Finest				Yes	adr loop group (voice actress)
2013	Endless Summer	Yes				Tracy (lead)
2014	Stuck For A Reason	Yes	Yes	Yes		Lydia (lead) – aired on African American Short Films
2015	A Pill For Two	Yes	Yes	Yes		Jade (won Best Actress Award)
2018	Acrimony				Yes	adr voice match (voice actress)
2018	Every Day				Yes	adr loop group (voice actress)

=== Television work ===
Year	Show	Credited as				
Year	Show	Actress	Writer	Singer	ADR	Role
1994	Gullah Gullah Island	Yes		Yes		Singing voice of Vanessa
1994	New York Undercover	Yes				Keesha
1995	Are You Afraid of the Dark?	Yes				Kate
2003	Nick Jr.	Yes				Host (Robyn)
2007	Damages				Yes	adr loop group voice actor
2015	African American Short Films	Yes	Yes			Lydia in Stuck for a Reason
2018	Black Lightning				Yes	adr loop group voice actor
2018	Luke Cage				Yes	adr loop group voice actor
2019	The Chi				Yes	adr loop group voice actor
2022	Primal				Yes	Amal (voice; 2 episodes)

=== Video games ===
Year	Title	Credited as			
Year	Title	Voice Actor	Singer	Rapper	Role
2017	Awesomenauts	Yes	Yes	Yes	Dizzy

== Musical theater ==
=== National tours ===
- Seussical The Musical – Sour Kangaroo, Young Kangaroo
- If You Give A Mouse A Cookie & Other Story Books – Grace, Borreguita

== Audiobooks ==
=== Self-development ===
- As a Woman Thinketh – Narrator
- At Your Command – Narrator
- Creative Mind – Narrator
- Creative Mind and Success – Narrator
- Feeling Is the Secret – Narrator
- How to Live Life and Love It – Narrator
- New Thought Theatre – Narrator
- Oprah: 40 Inspirational Life Lessons And Powerful Wisdom From Oprah Winfrey – Narrator
- Out of This World – Narrator
- Science of Mind – Narrator
- The Game of Life and How to Play It – Narrator
- The Secret Door to Success – Narrator
- Your Heart's Desire – Narrator
- Your Word Is Your Wand – Narrator

=== Religion and spirituality ===
- 31 Daily Affirmations Based On The Word of God – To Speak Over Your Life! – Narrator
- 31 Motivational Bible Verses! (31 Bible Verses By Subject Series) – Narrator
- 31 Powerful Prayers Guaranteed To Make Tremendous Power Available and Avail Much – Narrator
- 31 Powerful Prayers Of Thanksgiving – Guaranteed To Always Cause You To Triumph! – Narrator
- Bible Script for Life: Combat Depression with Jesus – Narrator
- Sermons from Hillary & The Holy Spirit: Make Friends With God – Narrator
- Sermons from Hillary & The Holy Spirit: Love Thy Neighbor – Narrator
- The Book of 1 John – King James Version – Narrator
- The Book of Proverbs – King James Version – Narrator
- The Book of Psalms – King James Version – Narrator
- The Book of Revelation – King James Version – Narrator

=== Kids ===
- Craig Meets Dave: And Learns About Autism, Bullying and Friendship – Narrator
- If I Were Oprah Winfrey: Little Nia's Dream – Narrator
- If I Were President Barack Obama: Little Hunter's Dream – Narrator
- June Peters, You Will Change The World One Day – Narrator
- Niños Cantando Por Jesus – Narrator
- Niños Cantando Por Jesus: Preparando a los Niños para Alabar y Adorar, Libro 2 – Narrator
- Special Ed Series Book 1 Meet Special Ed: Special Needs, Disabilities, Special Education – Narrator
- Special Ed First Day Of School Book 2: Autism, Blindness – Narrator
- Special Ed First Day Of School Book 3: Deafness, Down Syndrome, Epilepsy – Narrator
- Special Ed First Day of School Book 4: Diabetes, Dyslexia, Spina Bifida – Narrator
- Special Ed First Day Of School Book 5: Cerebral Palsy, Aphasia, ADHD, ADD, Special Needs, Special Education, Disabilities – Narrator
- Special People Special Ways – Narrator
- The Eighth Birthday Wish – Narrator
- Watoto Wakimuimbia Yesu: Kuwaandaa Watoto Kusifu Na Kuabudu (Swahili Edition) – Narrator
- Watoto Wakimuimbia Yesu: Kuwaandaa Watoto Kusifu Na Kuabudu, Kitabu cha 2 – Narrator

== Awards and nominations ==
Year	Award	Category	Result	Work
2018	Voice Arts Awards	Audiobook Narration – Author Performance, Best Voiceover	Nominated	Molestation Monologues
2016	Best Actress Award	Drama	Won	"A Pill For Two”
2015	Voice Arts Awards	Audiobook Narration – Metaphysical, Best Voiceover	Nominated	Your Word Is Your Wand
2014	Voice Arts Awards	Outstanding Audiobook Narration – Teens	Nominated	Desert Rice
