= Optimist International =

International service club

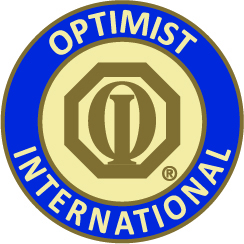
- Founded: 1919
- Type: Service
- Location: St. Louis, United States
- Origins: Louisville, Kentucky, United States
- Region served: Worldwide
- Method: Community service
- Members: ~80,000
- Website: www.optimist.org

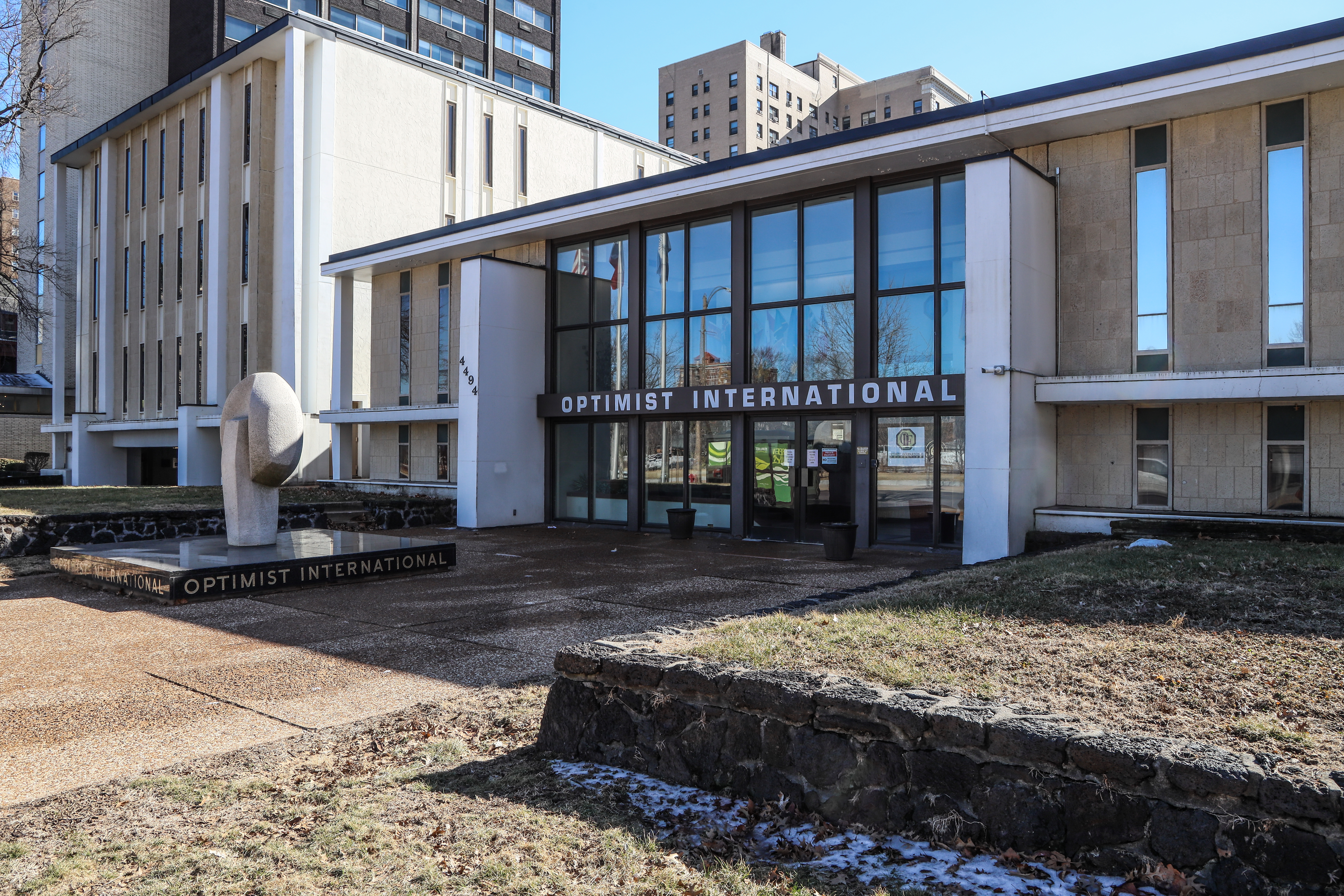
International headquarters

Optimist International is an international service club organization with almost 1,600 clubs and over 39,000 members in more than 20 countries. The international headquarters is located in St. Louis, Missouri, United States. Optimist International is also the sponsor of Junior Optimist International, designed for elementary school through high school aged youth.

== Organization ==
Optimist International is an organization comprising self-governing Optimist Clubs that engage in community service work. Every club raises its funds and independently selects service initiatives aimed at enhancing the well-being of children. Examples of typical projects include sponsoring youth athletic leagues, holding essay and oratorical contests for scholarships, and supporting local schools.

== History ==
The international organization was founded at a convention in Louisville, Kentucky, in 1919. It united various local and regional clubs, the first of which had been founded in Buffalo, New York, in 1911. At the convention, the first official charter of the international organization was awarded to the club in Downtown Indianapolis, Indiana which had been founded in 1916.

Several Optimist clubs participated in the June 1917 organization meeting of the Lions Clubs International held in Chicago, Illinois. However, the delegates sent by the clubs opted not to join the new organization and withdrew from the meeting.

== Organizational philosophy ==
Optimist International delineates its mission, vision, and purpose to encapsulate its objective of promoting and fostering the development of youth. These statements serve as a concise representation of the organization's goals.

In 1922, the Optimist Creed was adopted as the official creed of the organization. The Optimist Creed was developed by Christian D. Larson. It details a number of pledges to which members attempt to adhere.
