= Christian D. Larson =

Prolific American author (1874–1954)

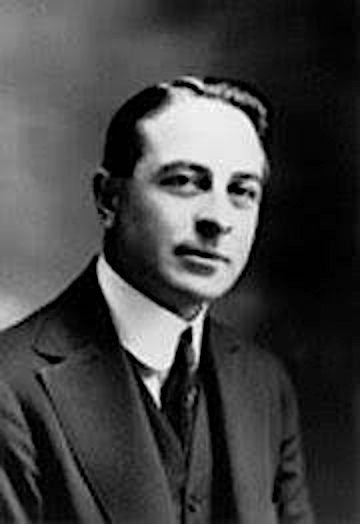
Christian Daa Larson

Christian Daa Larson (1874–1954) was an American New Thought leader and teacher, as well as a prolific author of metaphysical and New Thought books. He was credited by Horatio Dresser as being a founder in the New Thought movement. Many of Larson's books remain in print today, more than 100 years after they were first published, and his writings influenced notable New Thought authors and leaders, including Religious Science founder Ernest Holmes.

Larson was born near Forrest City, Iowa, of Norwegian descent. He attended Iowa State College and Meadville Theological School, a Unitarian theological school in Meadville, Pennsylvania. In his early twenties he became interested in the Mental Science teachings of Helen Wilmans, Henry Wood, Charles Brodie Patterson et al.

In 1898 Larson relocated to Cincinnati, Ohio. In January 1901, he organized the New Thought Temple at his residence at 947 West 17th St. In September 1901 he began to publish Eternal Progress, for several years one of the leading New Thought periodicals, building it to a circulation of over a quarter of a million. Meanwhile, he began his prolific book writing career.

Larson relocated to Los Angeles, California, around 1911. He married wife Georgea L DuBois on February 14, 1918. They had two children, Louise DuBois Larson (born 1920) and Christian D. Larson Jr. (born 1924). The family lived in Beverly Hills for many years.

Larson later became honorary president of the International New Thought Alliance and lectured extensively during the 1920s and 1930s. He was a colleague of such notables as William Walker Atkinson, Charles Brodie Patterson, and Home of Truth founder Annie Rix Militz.

Early in the career of Ernest Holmes, Larson's writings so impressed him that he abandoned Mary Baker Eddy's Christian Science textbook Science and Health with Key to the Scriptures for them. Ernest and his brother Fenwicke Holmes took a correspondence course with Larson, and in his biography of his brother, Ernest Holmes: His Life and Times, Fenwicke elaborates on the influence of Larson's thought on Ernest, ranking Larson's The Ideal Made Real (1912) with Ralph Waldo Trine's In Tune with the Infinite in its influence over him.

In 1918, Larson joined the staff of Science of Mind Magazine as an associate editor and frequent contributor. He was on the permanent faculty of Ernest Holmes' Institute of Religious Science as a teacher.

In 1912 Larson published a poem that eventually became the Optimist Creed, which in 1922 was adopted by Optimist International, better known as the Optimist Clubs.

== Books ==
- The Great Within (1907)
- Mastery of Fate (1907)
- How To Stay Young (1908)
- On the Heights (1908)
- The Ideal Made Real or Applied Metaphysics for Beginners (1909)
- Perfect Health (1910)
- Your Forces and How to Use Them (1910)
- Business Psychology (1912)
- How to remain well (1912)
- Just be Glad (1912)
- Mastery of Self (1912)
- The Mind Cure (1912)
- Thinking for Results (1912)
- What is Truth (1912)
- How the mind works (1912)
- The Pathway of Roses (1913)
- Brains and How to Get Them (1913)
- Nothing Succeeds Like Success (1916)
- What Right Thinking Will Do (1916)
- Healing Yourself (1918)
- Concentration (1920)
