= Florence Scovel Shinn =

American writer, artist and book illustrator (1871–1940)

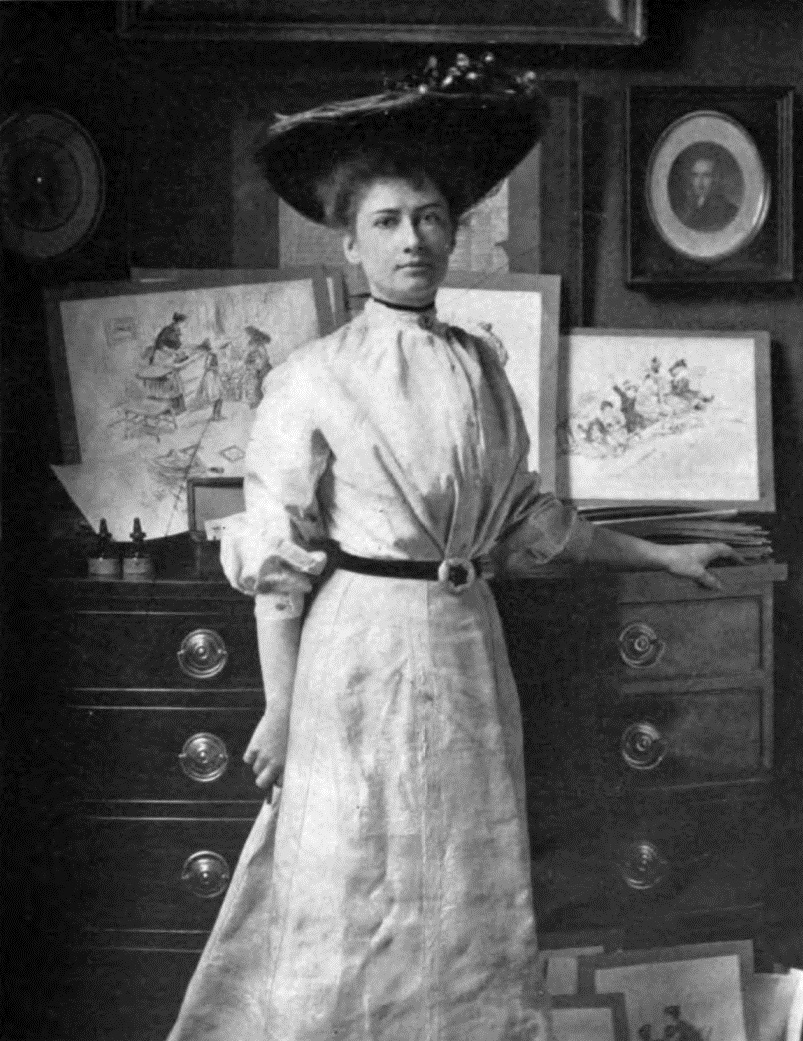
- Shinn in 1903 or earlier
- Born: September 24, 1871; Camden, New Jersey, U.S.
- Died: October 17, 1940 (aged 69)
- Occupations: Artist, author and New Thought spiritual teacher
- Spouse: Everett Shinn

Florence Scovel Shinn (September 24, 1871 – October 17, 1940) was an American artist and book illustrator who became a New Thought spiritual teacher and metaphysical writer in her middle years.

In New Thought circles, Shinn is best known for her first book, The Game of Life and How to Play It (1925). She expressed her philosophy as:

The invisible forces are ever working for man who is always "pulling the strings" himself, though he does not know it. Owing to the vibratory power of words, whatever man voices, he begins to attract.
--The Game of Life, Florence Scovel Shinn

== Early life and education ==
Florence Scovel was born in Camden, New Jersey, the daughter of Alden Cortlandt Scovel and Emily Hopkinson Scovel. Her great-great-grandfather, Francis Hopkinson, signed the United States Declaration of Independence and is the earliest-documented American composer of song.

She was educated in Philadelphia, where she attended the Pennsylvania Academy of the Fine Arts and met her future husband, the artist Everett Shinn (1876–1953). After marriage, they moved into a studio apartment at 112 Waverly Place, near Washington Square Park in Greenwich Village, New York City, where Everett built a theatre next door and wrote three plays in which Florence played a leading role. They spent their summers in Plainfield, New Hampshire (Cornish Art Colony), in a Colonial-style house designed by her husband. Florence and Everett divorced in 1912.

== Illustrator ==
Florence worked as an illustrator in the early 1900s. She illustrated fiction in Harper's and other magazines, as well as popular novels such as Mrs. Wiggs of the Cabbage Patch (1901). The Society of Illustrators elected her to an Associate Membership in 1903, even though it did not admit women to full membership in the organization until 1922.

An early biographical sketch of Florence Scovel Shinn as an illustrator offers insight into her later writings and attitude towards life:

Her keen sense of humor crops out in every group, and the turn of a line gives a comical effect. The peculiar gift that Mrs. Shinn is endowed with is that she can draw the most pitiful little figures and yet infuse into the picture a happy, healthy atmosphere that impresses us with the worth and joy of living. Her characters are never caricatures; they are appealing and provoke the laughter that bears no malice.

== Writings and New Thought ==
Her metaphysical works began with her self-published The Game of Life and How to Play it in 1925. Your Word is Your Wand was published in 1928 and The Secret Door to Success in 1940. After her death another two works were published, The Power of the Spoken Word in 1945 by Shinn Press and The Magic Path of Intuition. This last book was published by Louise Hay in 2013 who received from a rare-books dealer a small, typewritten unpublished manuscript of the last writings of Florence Scovel Shinn, accompanied by a cover letter which said in part:

Several Months ago we came across a unique item from that collection that we think you may have an interest in. The item is an original typewritten manuscript by Florence Scovel Shinn, The Magic Path of Intuition. We're contacting you to see if you or Hay House have an interest in purchasing this rare original manuscript positioned to share its content with the world.

The Game of Life and How to Play it includes quotes from the Bible and anecdotal explanations of the author's understanding of God and man. Her philosophy centers on the power of positive thought and usually includes instructions for verbal or physical affirmation.

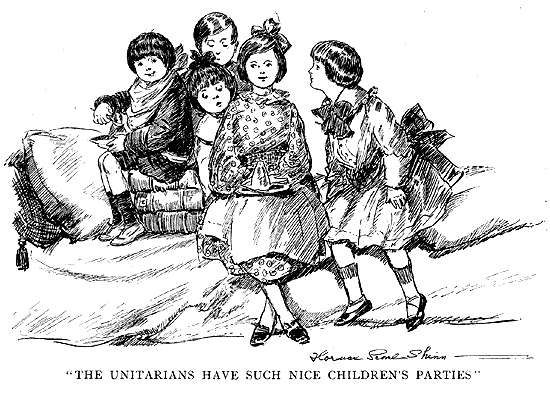
"The Unitarians have such nice children's parties", a drawing published in The Century Illustrated Monthly Magazine, 1904

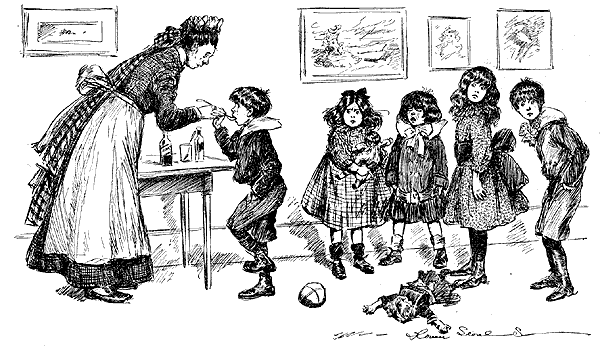
Childhood's Happy Hour, from Harper's Monthly magazine, August 1903

One example

Her advice is usually accompanied by a "real-life" anecdote, as for the above "Love one another.

A woman I know, had, for years an appearance of a terrible skin disease. The doctors told her it was incurable, and she was in despair. She was on the stage, and she feared she would soon have to give up her profession, and she had no other means of support. She, however, procured a good engagement, and on the opening night, made a great "hit". She received flattering notices from the critics, and was joyful and elated. The next day she received a notice of dismissal. A man in the cast had been jealous of her success and had caused her to be sent away. She felt hatred and resentment taking complete possession of her, and she cried out, "Oh God don't let me hate that man." That night she worked for hours "in the silence".
She said, "I soon came into a very deep silence. I seemed to be at peace with myself, with the man, and with the whole world. I continued this for two following nights, and on the third day I found I was healed completely of the skin disease!" In asking for love, or good will, she had fulfilled the law, ("for love is the fulfilling of the law") and the disease (which came from subconscious resentment) was wiped out.

In short, what you think about, you bring about. This power is ordained by God as your gift, a gift to all mankind. She believed thought manifests tangible resolutions to every inequity through the power of God. She declares that God wants for you what you want for yourself. If you have not yet manifested that want or desire it is because you do not understand how to tap into the power God has given all mankind.

Her books Your Word is Your Wand and The Game of Life and How To Play It were released as audiobooks in 2014 and 2015, respectively, with narration by actress Hillary Hawkins.

Shinn is considered part of the New Thought movement, as her writings follow in the tradition of Phineas Quimby (1802–1866), Mary Baker Eddy (1821–1910), Emma Curtis Hopkins (1849–1925), and both Charles Fillmore (1854–1948) and Myrtle Fillmore (1845–1931), co-founders of the Unity Church.

Motivational author Louise Hay acknowledged her as an early influence.

== Later years ==
=== Illness and death ===
According to her obituary, after an "illness of several weeks," Shinn died at her home in 1136 Fifth Avenue on October 17, 1940.

== Work ==
Published work during her life

| Year | Title |
|---|---|
| 1925 | The Game of Life and How to Play it |
| 1928 | Your Word is Your Wand |
| 1940 | The Secret Door to Success |

Published work after her death

| Year | Title |
|---|---|
| 1945 | The Power of the Spoken Word |
| 1989 | Collected works: F.S. Shinn, The Wisdom of Florence Scovel Shinn: Four complete books |
| 2013 | The Magic Path of Intuition |

== Bibliography ==
- Butler-Bowdon, Tom "The Secret Door To Success" by Florence Scovel Shinn - a commentary in 50 Success Classics: Winning Wisdom for Work and Life from 50 Landmark Books (2004) Nicholas Brealey Publishing, pp. 246–251. ISBN 1-85788-333-0 Accessed May 2008.
- Haanel, Charles F. Master Key Arcana Published 2004, Kallisti Publishing. Page 148. ISBN 0-9678514-4-0
- Rubinstein, Charlotte Streifer American Women Artists: From Early Indian Times to the Present Published 1982 G.K. Hall ISBN 0-8161-8535-2
- John Cook, Steve Deger, Leslie Ann Gibson. The Book of Positive Quotations Published 2007, Fairview Press ISBN 1-57749-169-6. Contains eight quotations by Florence Scovel Shinn.
- Sheppard, Alice (1984) There Were Ladies Present: American Women Cartoonists and Comic Artists in the Early Twentieth Century The Journal of American Culture 7 (3), 38–48 doi:10.1111/j.1542-734X.1984.0703_38.x (pdf) Accessed May 2008
- "Obituary: MRS. FLORENCE SHINN, WRITER AND LECTURER; Specialised in Metaphysics-- Also Known as an Illustrator" (pdf). The New York Times. 18 October 1940.

The Cornish Colony:

- Virginia Reed Colby, James B. Atkinson. Footprints of the Past, Images of Cornish, New Hampshire, and the Cornish Colony. New Hampshire Historical Society, Concord, New Hampshire, 1996.
