= Stuart Grayson =

- Born: March 15, 1923; New York, New York, U.S.
- Died: July 12, 2001 (aged 78); New York, New York, U.S.
- Occupation(s): Minister, philosopher, author
- Known for: Author, influencer of the Religious Science

Stuart Grayson (March 15, 1923 – July 12, 2001) was an American New Thought author and Religious Science minister. The pastor to Manhattan's First Church of Religious Science until 1999, Grayson was also the director of the Center for Creative Living in New York City. He was the Pastor Emeritus there until his death. Grayson appeared on a weekly television series airing in New York City called Creative Living. In 2005, he was referred to as "one of the foremost" Religious Science ministers.

== Biography ==
Grayson spoke every Sunday at Alice Tully Hall in New York’s Lincoln Center for over thirty years.

Grayson's final bestseller Spiritual Healing: A Simple Guide for the Healing of Body, Mind, and Spirit had a great impact on New Thought. It was featured in the New York Post as part of their "Post Book Bonus" in a series that ran consecutively for a week from December 29, 1997 to January 1, 1998. Each day focused on different aspects of healing and wellness as recommended in the book, and focused on the Science of Mind practice of Spiritual Mind Treatment.

== Bibliography ==
- (1986) The Ten Demandments of Prosperity. Dodd Mead. ISBN 0-396-08589-X
- (1995) Collected Essays of Stuart Grayson. DeVorss & Company. ISBN 978-0-87516-679-7
- (1997) Spiritual Healing: A Simple Guide for the Healing of Body, Mind, and Spirit. Simon & Schuster. ISBN 0-684-82365-9
