= Timeline of Nagasaki =

The following is a timeline of the history of the city of Nagasaki, Japan.

== Prior to 20th century ==
- 12th C. – Included in the fief of Nagasaki Kotaro.
- 1571 – Port of Nagasaki established; opens to foreign ships.
- 1597 – 26 Christians executed.
- 1614 – Suwa Shrine built.
- 1626 – Nagasaki Kunchi (shrine festival) begins.
- 1634 – Megane Bridge built.
- 1637 – Shimabara Rebellion occurs near Nagasaki.
- 1638 – Sannō Shrine founded.
- 1641 – "Dutch Confined to Dejima Island" in Nagasaki harbor.
- 1855 – "Modern shipbuilding yard" established.
- 1858 – Port opened to foreign trade.
- 1861 – Nagasaki Shipping List and Advertiser begins publication.
- 1865 – Catholic Ōura Church built.
- 1876 – Saikai Shimbun (newspaper) begins publication.
- 1877 – Immaculate Conception Cathedral, Nagasaki founded.
- 1887 – Population: 40,187.
- 1888 – Sakamoto International Cemetery established.
- 1889 – Value of imports £1,005,367.
- 1893 – Mitsubishi Nagasaki Zosensho (shipyard) active.
- 1894 – Value of imports £444,839.
- 1898 – Kyushu Tosu-Nogasaki railway begins operating.

== 20th century ==
- 1902 – Tōyō Hinode Shimbun (newspaper) begins publication.
- 1903 – Population: 151,727.
- 1905
  - Nagasaki Station opens.
  - Nagasaki Higher Commercial School founded.
  - Population: 163,324.
- 1915 – Nagasaki Electric Tramway begins operating.
- 1923 – Nagasaki Medical College established.
- 1925 – Population: 189,071.
- 1945
  - August 9: Atomic bombing of Nagasaki by US forces.
  - Population: 142,748.
- 1949 – Nagasaki University established.
- 1950 – Population: 241,805.
- 1955 – Sister city relationship established with Saint Paul, United States.
- 1957 – Glover house (museum) opens.
- 1959 – Nagasaki Aquarium founded.
- 1972 – Sister city relationship established with Santos, Brazil.
- 1974 – Population: 445,655.
- 1978 – Sister city relationships established with Middelburg, Netherlands, and Porto, Portugal.
- 1979 – Hitoshi Motoshima becomes mayor.
- 1980
  - Nagasaki Bio Park founded.
  - Sister city relationship established with Fuzhou, China.
  - Population: 502,799.
- 1990 – January 18: 1990 Nagasaki shooting incident, targeting mayor Motoshima.
- 1995 – Iccho Itoh becomes mayor.
- 1996 – Nagasaki Atomic Bomb Museum built.
- 2000 – Population: 423,163.

== 21st century ==
- 2001 – Nagasaki Penguin Aquarium opens.
- 2002 – Use of Nagasaki Smart Card on public transit begins.
- 2005
  - Iōjima, Kōyagi, Nomozaki, Sanwa, Sotome, and Takashima become part of city.
  - Nagasaki Museum of History and Culture and Nagasaki Prefectural Art Museum open.
  - Sister city relationship established with Vaux-sur-Aure, France.
- 2007
  - April 17: 2007 Nagasaki shooting incident, fatally targeting mayor Itoh.
  - April 22: Tomihisa Taue becomes mayor.
- 2010 – Population: 443,766.

== See also ==
- Nagasaki history
- Timeline of Nagasaki (in Japanese)
- List of mayors of Nagasaki

== Bibliography ==
Published in the 19th century

- G.F. Meijlan (1830). "Stad Nagasaky". In J.H. Tobias (ed.). Japan (in Dutch). Amsterdam: M. Westerman & Zoon – via HathiTrust.
- Philipp Franz von Siebold (1841). "(Town of Nagasaki)". Manners and Customs of the Japanese, in the Nineteenth Century. London: John Murray. hdl:2027/hvd.hw26ti – via HathiTrust.
- William Henry Overall, ed. (1870). "Nagasaki". Dictionary of Chronology. London: William Tegg. hdl:2027/uc2.ark:/13960/t9m32q949.
- John Ramsay McCulloch (1880), "Nagasaki", in Hugh G. Reid (ed.), A Dictionary, Practical, Theoretical and Historical of Commerce and Commercial Navigation, London: Longmans, Green, and Co. – via Internet Archive

Published in the 20th century

- Engelbert Kaempfer (1906) [1727]. "Of Nagasacki". History of Japan. Vol. 2. Translated by Johann Caspar Scheuchzer [in German]. Glasgow: James MacLehose and Sons. hdl:2027/mdp.39015047659159. (first published in 1727)
- "Nagasaki" . Encyclopædia Britannica. Vol. 19 (11th ed.). 1910. p. 151.
- "Nagasaki (Hizen)", Handbook for Travellers in Japan (9th ed.), London: J. Murray, 1913, hdl:2027/nnc1.50290956
- T. Philip Terry (1914), "Nagasaki", Terry's Japanese Empire, Boston: Houghton Mifflin, LCCN 14005129
- Diego Pacheco (1970). "Founding of the Port of Nagasaki and its Cession to the Society of Jesus". Monumenta Nipponica. 25 (3/4): 303–323. doi:10.2307/2383539. JSTOR 2383539.
- Schellinger; Salkin, eds. (1996). "Nagasaki". International Dictionary of Historic Places: Asia and Oceania. UK: Routledge. p. 612+. ISBN 9781884964046.

Published in the 21st century

- Reinier H. Hesselink (2004). "Two Faces of Nagasaki: The World of the Suwa Festival Screen". Monumenta Nipponica. 59 (2): 179–222. JSTOR 25066290.
- 'Hugh Cortazzi, ed. (2012). "Nagasaki". Victorians in Japan: In and Around the Treaty Ports. Bloomsbury. pp. 3–32. ISBN 978-1-78093-977-3. (first published in 1987)
- David Palmer (2016). "Nagasaki's Districts: Western Contact with Japan through the History of a City's Space". Journal of Urban History. 42.
- Geoffrey C. Gunn, World Trade Systems of the East and West: Nagasaki and the Asian Bullion Trade Networks (Leiden: Brill, 2017) ISBN 978-90-04-35855-3
