= Hashima Island =

Abandoned island near Nagasaki, Japan

Hashima
Native name: 端島 Nickname: Battleship Island
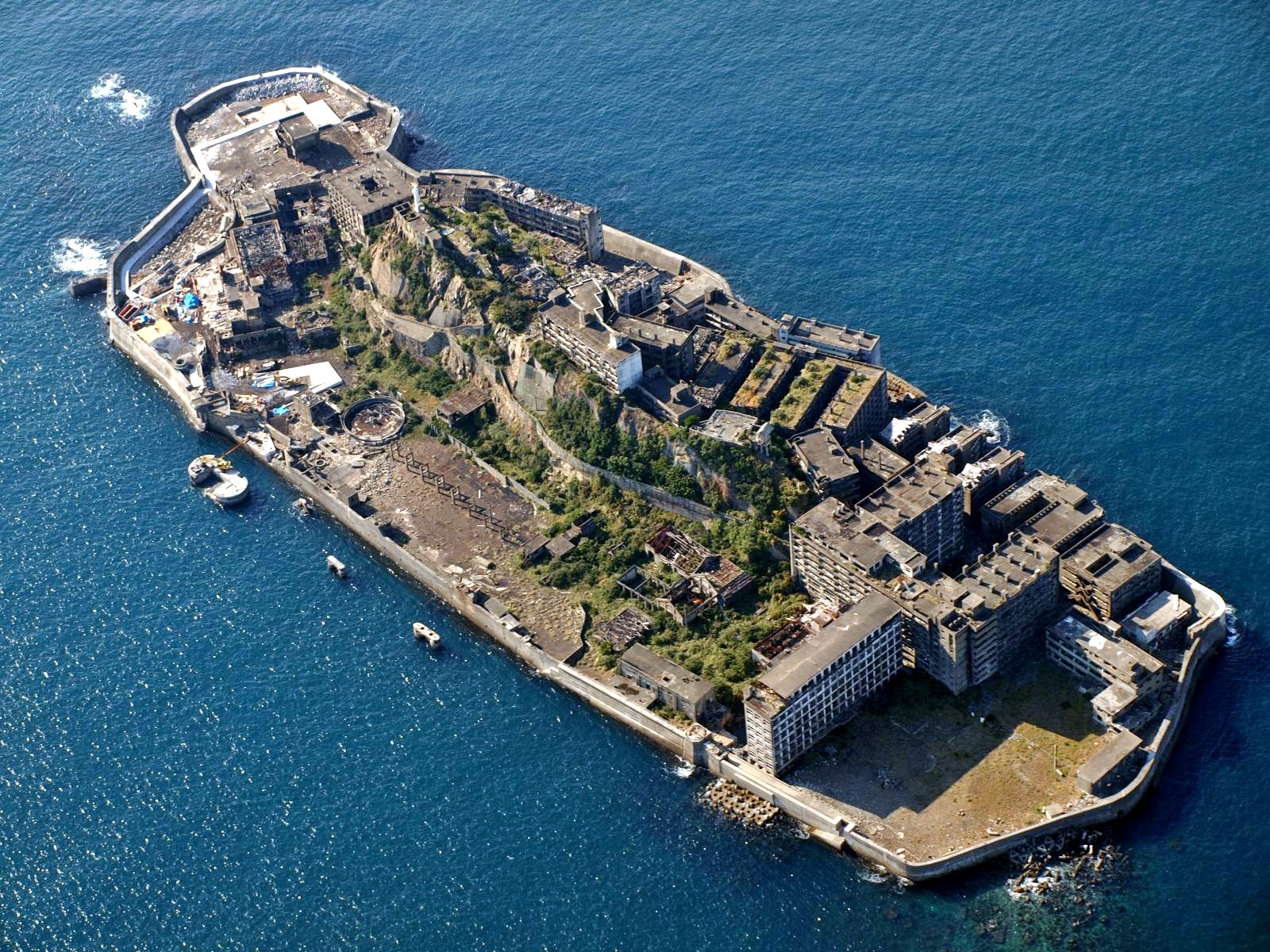
- Aerial view

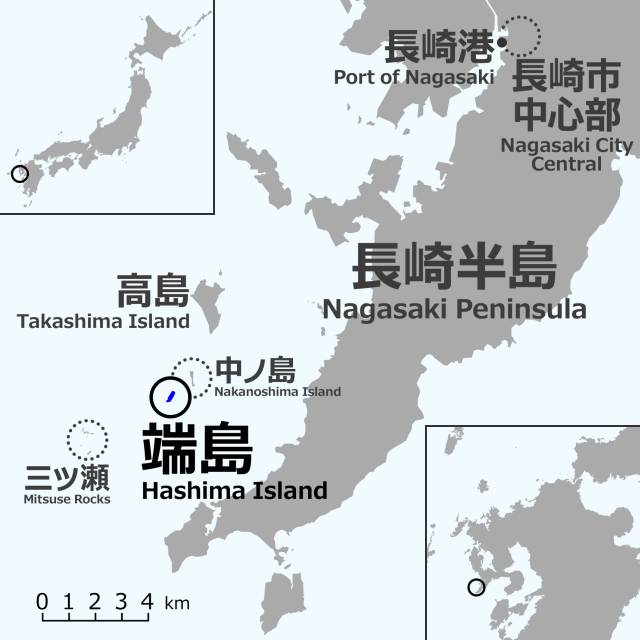

Geography
- Location: Northeast Asia
- Coordinates: 32°37′40″N 129°44′18″E
- Area: 0.063 km^{2} (0.024 sq mi)
- Area rank: none

Administration
- Japan
- Prefecture: Nagasaki
- City: Nagasaki

Demographics
- Population: 0 (2020)

Various views from the ocean and from on the island, 2016

Hashima Island (端島; or simply Hashima, as -shima is a Japanese suffix for 'island'), commonly called Gunkanjima (軍艦島; meaning 'Battleship Island'), is an abandoned island about 15 kilometres (8 nautical miles) from the centre of Nagasaki, Japan. It is one of 505 uninhabited islands in Nagasaki Prefecture. The island's most notable features are its abandoned concrete buildings, undisturbed except by nature, and the surrounding seawall. While the island is a symbol of the rapid industrialisation of Japan, it is also a reminder of Japanese war crimes as a site of forced labour prior to and during World War II.

The 6.3-hectare (16-acre) island was known for its undersea coal mines, established in 1887, which operated during the industrialisation of Japan. The island reached a peak population of 5,259 in 1959. In 1974, with the coal reserves nearing depletion, the mine was closed and all of the residents departed soon after, leaving the island effectively abandoned for the following three decades.

Interest in the island re-emerged in the 2000s on account of its undisturbed historic ruins, and it gradually became a tourist attraction. Certain collapsed exterior walls have since been restored, and travel to Hashima was reopened to tourists on 22 April 2009. Increasing interest in the island resulted in an initiative for its protection as a site of industrial heritage.

After much controversy, the island's coal mine was formally approved as a UNESCO World Heritage Site in July 2015, as part of the Sites of Japan's Meiji Industrial Revolution series. Japan and South Korea negotiated a deal to facilitate this, in which Korea would not object to allowing Hashima Island to be included, while Japan would cover the history of forced labour on the island. All other UNESCO committee members agreed that Japan did not fulfill its obligations, and efforts to mediate this are ongoing.

== Etymology ==
Battleship Island is an English translation of the Japanese nickname for Hashima Island, Gunkanjima (gunkan meaning warship, Jima being the rendaku form of Shima, meaning island). The island's nickname came from its resemblance from a distance to the Japanese battleship Tosa.

== History ==
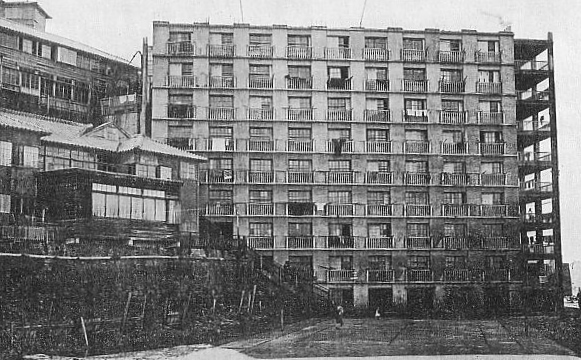
An apartment block on the island, c. 1930

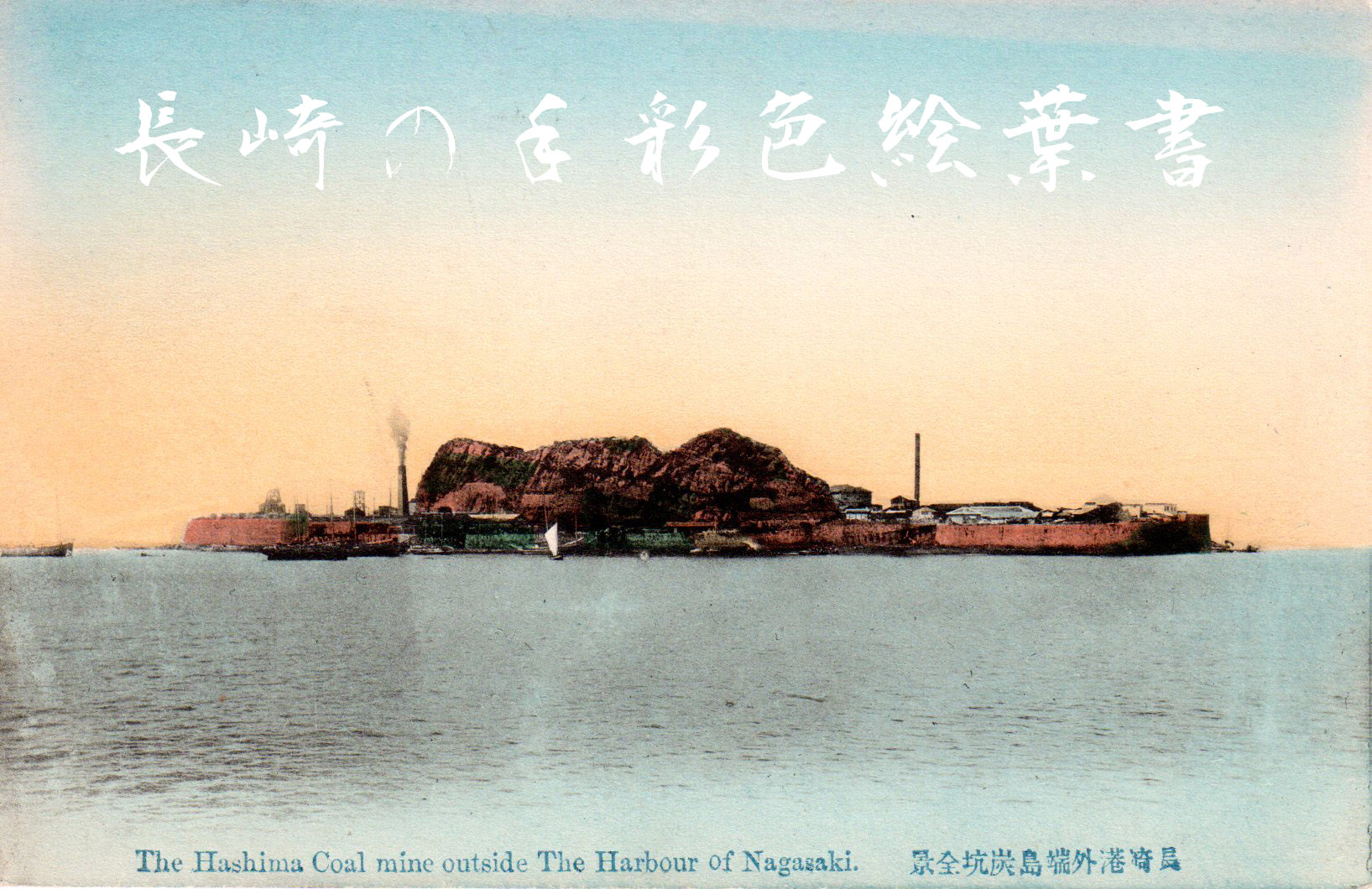
Hand-tinted postcard of Hashima from the Meiji era

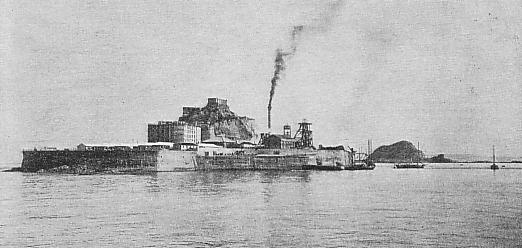
Hashima c. 1930

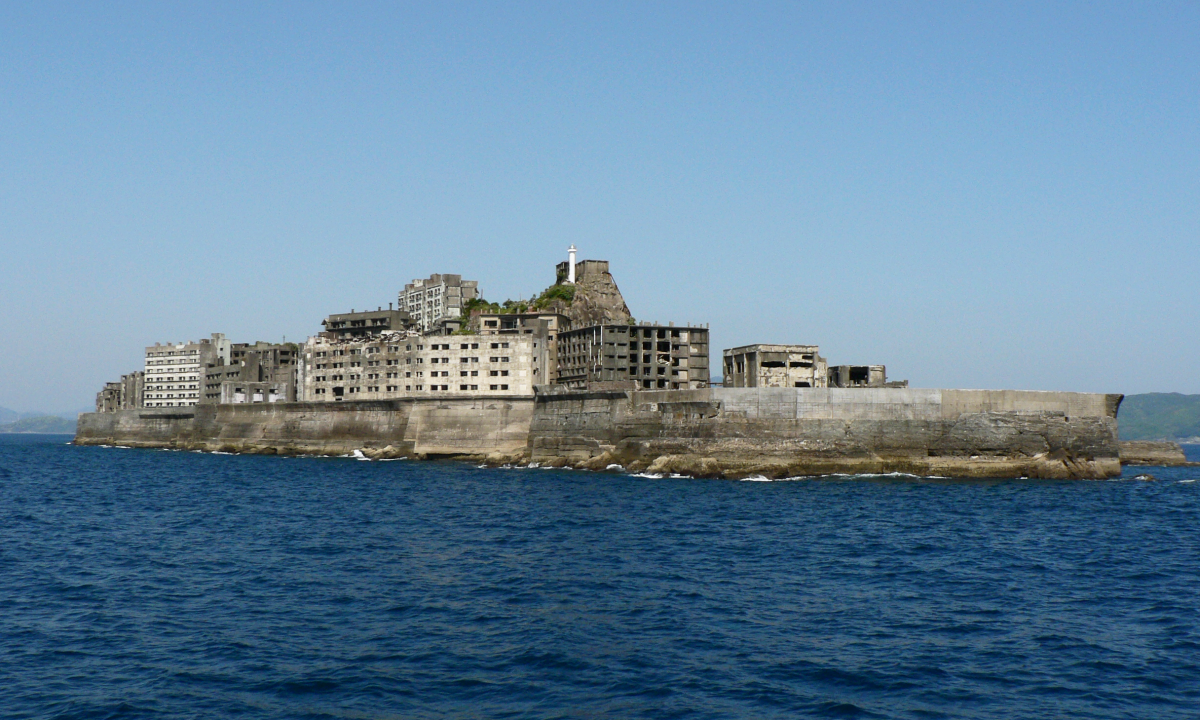
View of the island in 2009

Coal was discovered on the island around 1810, and the island was continuously inhabited from 1887 to 1974 as a seabed coal mining facility. Mitsubishi Goshi Kaisha bought the island in 1890 and began extracting coal from undersea mines, while seawalls and land reclamation (which tripled the size of the island) were constructed. Four main mine-shafts (reaching up to a kilometre deep) were built, with one actually connecting it to neighbouring Nakano Island. Between 1891 and 1974, around 15.7 million tons of coal were excavated in mines with temperatures of 30 °C and 95% humidity.

In 1916, the company built Japan's first large reinforced concrete building (a 7-floor miner's apartment block), to accommodate their burgeoning ranks of workers. Concrete was specifically used to protect against typhoon destruction. Over the next 55 years, more buildings were constructed, including apartment blocks, a school, kindergarten, hospital, town hall, and a community centre. For entertainment, a clubhouse, cinema, communal bath, swimming pool, rooftop gardens, shops, and a pachinko parlour were built for the miners and their families.

Beginning in the 1930s and until the end of World War II, conscripted Korean civilians and Chinese prisoners of war worked under very harsh conditions and brutal treatment at the Mitsubishi facility as forced labourers under Japanese wartime mobilisation policies. During this period, many of these conscripted labourers died on the island due to various dangers, including underground accidents, exhaustion, and malnutrition; 137 died by one estimate; about 1,300 by another.

In 1959, the 6.3-hectare (16-acre) island's population reached its peak of 5,259, with a population density of 835 people per hectare (83,634 people/km^{2}, 216,264 people per square mile) for the whole island, or 1,391 per hectare (139,100 people/km^{2}) for the residential district.

As petroleum replaced coal in Japan in the 1960s, coal mines began shutting down across the country, and Hashima's mines were no exception. Mitsubishi officially closed the mine in January 1974, and the island was cleared of inhabitants on 20 April.

Today, its most notable features are the abandoned and still mostly-intact concrete apartment buildings, the surrounding seawall, and its distinctive profile. The island has been administered as part of Nagasaki city since the merger with the former town of Takashima in 2005. Travel to Hashima was re-opened on 22 April 2009, after 35 years of closure.

== Current status ==
Collapsed buildings and rubble seen from the visitor walkway, 2017

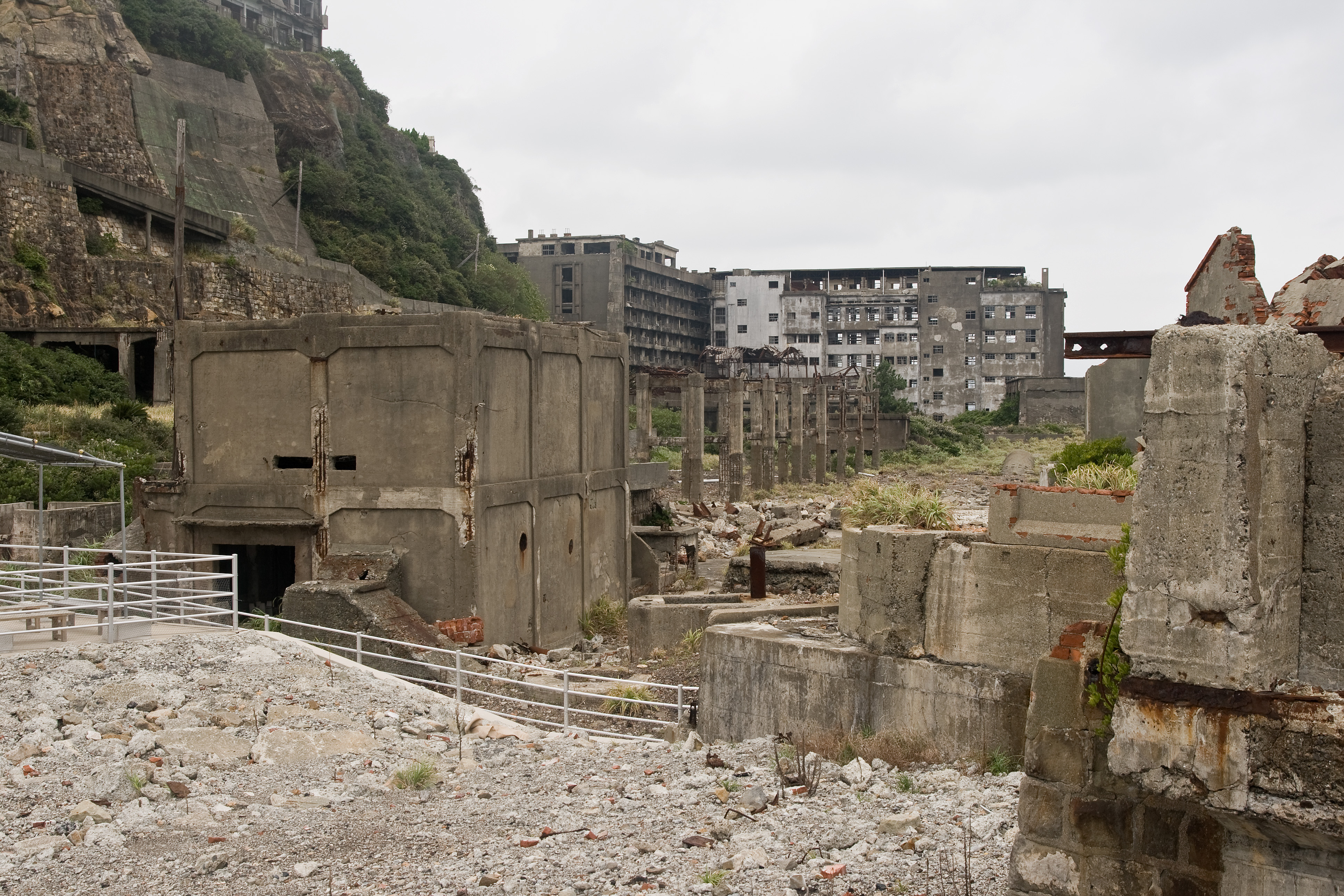
Ruins of the mine, 2011

The island was owned by Mitsubishi until 2002, when it was voluntarily transferred to Takashima Town. Currently, Nagasaki City, which absorbed Takashima Town in 2005, exercises jurisdiction over the island. On 23 August 2005, landing was permitted by the city hall to journalists only. At the time, Nagasaki City planned the restoration of a pier for tourist landings in April 2008. In addition a visitor walkway 220 meters (722 feet) in length was planned, and entry to unsafe building areas was to be prohibited. Due to the delay in development construction, however, at the end of 2007, the city announced that public access was delayed until spring 2009. Additionally the city encountered safety concerns, arising from the risk of collapse of the buildings on the island due to significant ageing.

It was estimated that landing of tourists would only be feasible for fewer than 160 days per year because of the area's harsh weather. For reasons of cost-effectiveness, the city considered cancelling plans to extend the visitor walkway further—for an approximate 300 metres (984 feet) toward the eastern part of the island and approximately 190 metres (623 feet) toward the western part of the island—after 2009. A small portion of the island was finally reopened for tourism in 2009, but more than 95% of the island is strictly delineated as off-limits during tours. A full reopening of the island would require substantial investment in safety, and detract from the historical state of the aged buildings on the property.

The island is increasingly gaining international attention not only generally for its modern regional heritage, but also for the undisturbed housing complex remnants representative of the period from the Taishō period to the Shōwa period. It has become a frequent subject of discussion among enthusiasts for ruins. Since the abandoned island has not been maintained, several buildings have collapsed, mainly due to typhoon damage, and other buildings are in danger of collapse. However, some of the collapsed exterior walls have been restored with concrete.

== Access ==
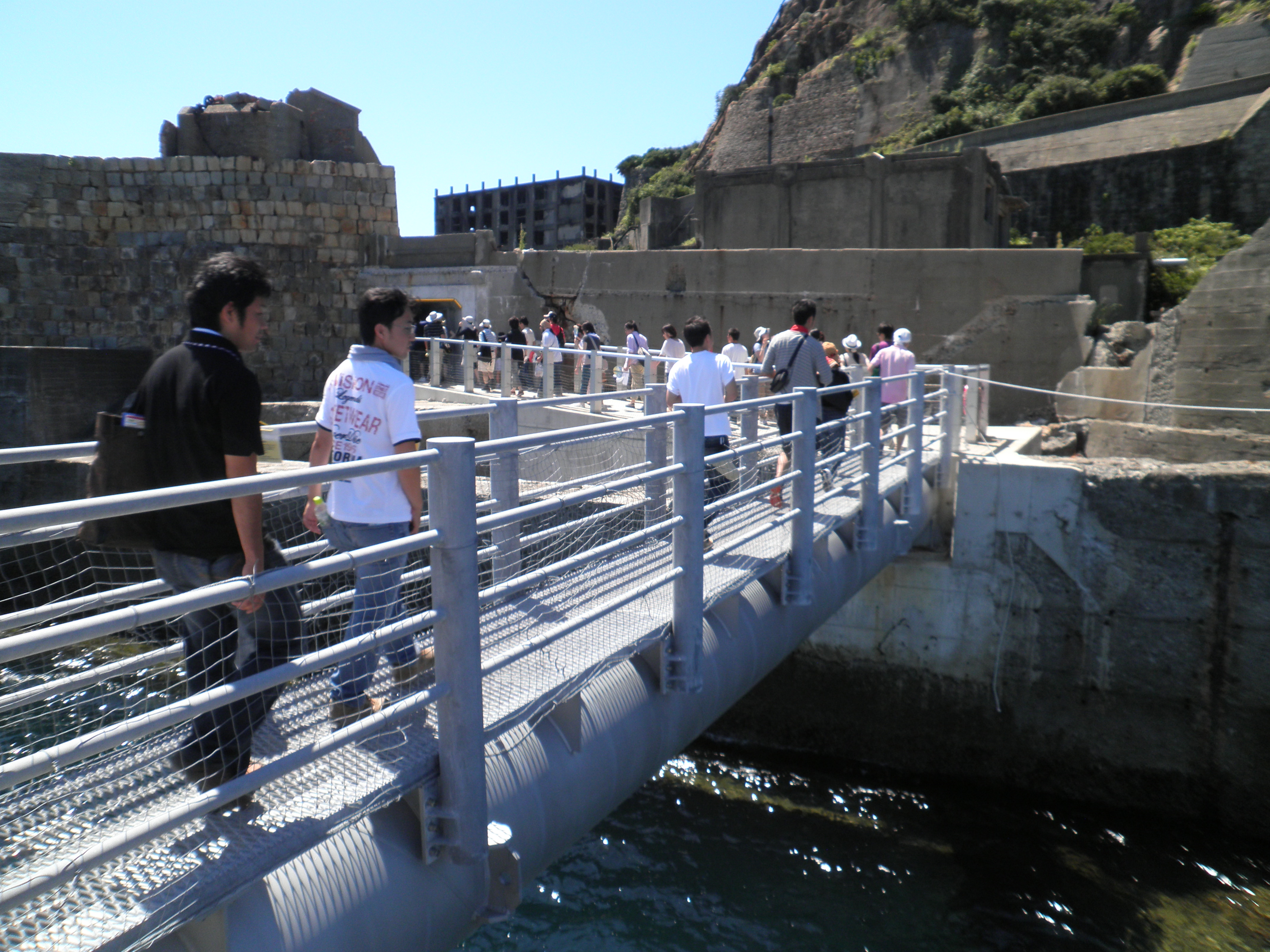
Sightseeing on the island, August 2010

When people resided on the island, the Nomo Shosen line served the island from Nagasaki Port via Iōjima Island and Takashima Island. Twelve round-trip services were available per day in 1970. It took 50 minutes to travel from the island to Nagasaki. After all residents left the island, this direct route was discontinued.

Since April 2009, a small southern section of the island has been open for public visits, although there are restrictions by Nagasaki city's ordinance. The residential sections occupying most of the island remain publicly off-limits.

== World Heritage Site approval controversy ==
In 2009, Japan requested to include Hashima Island, along with 22 other industrial sites, in the UNESCO World Heritage Site list. The inclusion of Hashima in particular was condemned by the South Korean, North Korean, and Chinese governments. South Korea argued that the official recognition of those sites would "violate the dignity of the survivors of forced labour" and that "World Heritage sites should [...] be acceptable by all peoples across the globe".

South Korea and Japan eventually agreed on a compromise: that Japan would present information about the use of forced labour in relevant sites and both nations would cooperate towards the approval of each other's World Heritage Site candidates.

On 5 July 2015, at the 39th UNESCO World Heritage Committee (WHC) meeting, South Korea formally withdrew its opposition to Hashima Island being on the list. Japan's UNESCO representative Kuni Sato committed to acknowledging the issue as part of the history of the island, and stated that "there were a large number of Koreans and others who were brought against their will and forced to work under harsh conditions in the 1940s at some of the sites [including Hashima Island]". Japan also claimed to be "prepared to incorporate appropriate measures into the interpretive strategy to remember the victims such as the establishment of information centre".

The site was subsequently approved for inclusion on the UNESCO World Heritage list on 5 July as part of the item Sites of Japan's Meiji Industrial Revolution: Iron and Steel, Shipbuilding and Coal Mining.

=== Historical revisionism and international condemnation ===
Immediately after the UNESCO WHC meeting, Japanese Foreign Minister Fumio Kishida rejected the idea that Koreans were "forced labourers", and claimed that they were instead "requisitioned against their will" to work. This remark was condemned by a South Korean government official as being nonsensical and evasive.

The Japanese politician Kōko Katō, a close ally of Prime Minister Shinzo Abe, was to manage the preparation of the sites. The Japanese government gave Katō's private company, the National Congress of Industrial Heritage (産業遺産国民会議), a budget of at least 1.35 billion yen. Even before the opening of the first museum covering Hashima, Katō used part of her budget to publish a series of articles and videos that denied that Koreans were ever forced to labour on the island. This includes videos that single out and attempt to discredit individual Korean survivors.

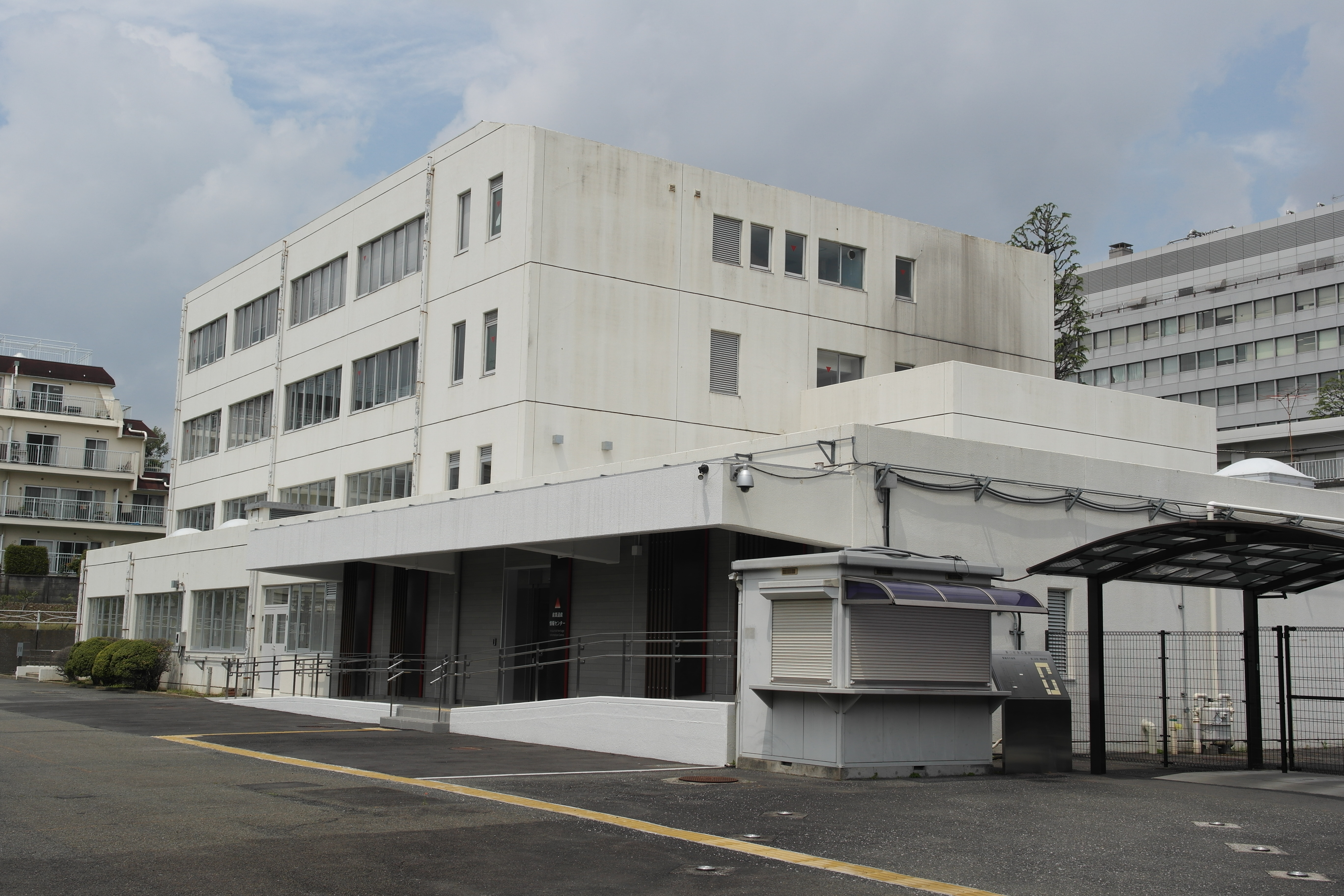
The Industrial Heritage Information Centre in Tokyo (2020)

On 15 June 2020, the Industrial Heritage Information Centre (産業遺産情報センター; IHIC) opened in Tokyo. Shortly afterwards, the South Korean Ministry of Foreign Affairs officially strongly protested the interpretations of Hashima Island presented at the IHIC, which it characterised as revisionist. A number of domestic observers echoed these sentiments and called for Japan to correct the exhibit.

These complaints prompted UNESCO to send a committee to investigate. In June 2021, the committee published a report that found that Japan had failed to meet its end of the original agreement. The report stated that:

The oral testimonies displayed [in the centre], which were all related to Hashima Island, convey the message that there were no instances of [Koreans and others] being forced to work there. The mission has therefore concluded that the interpretive measures to allow an understanding of those brought against their will and forced to work are currently insufficient.

The IHIC's displays were based mostly on Katō's primary sources, all of whom were based in Japan. Only one Korean had his testimony presented in the exhibit; he was a young child on the island and did not recall the labour conditions or experiencing discrimination. Some of the testimonies (all from Japanese residents) explicitly deny that Koreans were discriminated against. Most testimonies are reportedly from people who were children on the island or left the island at a young age, and had little actual contact with Korean labourers there.

Soon afterwards, the other 21 nations of the World Heritage Committee unanimously called for Japan to revise the exhibit. These calls were echoed by The Asahi Shimbun and a number of other observers. UNESCO asked Katō and the IHIC to submit a report with their future plans to revise the exhibit by 1 December 2022.

Katō published a response on 4 August, in which she rejected the possibility of acknowledging forced labour and claimed that "the people from the Korean Peninsula on Hashima Island [...] supported the system of increased production as a harmonious workforce like a family". Meanwhile, she had been conducting interviews with and inviting far right historical revisionists to visit her museum, such as Toshio Motoya, who denies that the Nanjing Massacre occurred. She also appeared in an interview with Japan-based American influencer Kent Gilbert, who denies that Japan had sex slaves during World War II. In many of her interviews, she spent significant time discrediting Korean survivors.

Japan did not meet the deadline, and instead submitted a 577-page document defending the IHIC and saying its exhibits showed the complete history of the island. It also filed a request to have Sado Island, another island where forced labour took place, to be recognised as a UNESCO site.

In 2023, a number of new exhibits were installed at the IHIC to quell the concerns of UNESCO and South Korea. The museum reportedly maintains that no systemic discrimination occurred towards Koreans, and its new exhibits align with this message. In one exhibit, a video is played of Kuni Sato's affirmation that forced labour occurred. A reporter for The Hankyoreh claimed that there are no Japanese subtitles for the English-language statement. Another exhibit acknowledges the occurrence of a mine cave-in, during which workers of varying ethnicities, including Korean, died. There are reportedly no testimonies from Koreans about forced labour or discrimination; one testimony from a Korean expresses denial of any discrimination occurring.

In September 2023, UNESCO reported that Japan had taken some measures to improve the situation, but asked for continual improvements and for a follow-up report due 1 December 2024. South Korea requested continuing dialogue on improvements. A reporter for The Hankyoreh argued that UNESCO's report leaned positive because South Korean representatives under the administration of President Yoon Suk Yeol, who is considered to be friendlier to Japan, did not adequately challenge the changes.

In February 2025, the WHC released a report that found that the IHIC had still not adequately addressed forced labour in its exhibits. According to South Korean officials, Korean victims testimonies were included in the museum, but they were left in the Korean language and put on a bookshelf, rather than being in a museum display.

=== NHK documentary controversies ===
Around 2020, Katō learned of a 1955 documentary about the island called Island Without Green (緑なき島). It was produced by Japanese broadcaster NHK, and portrayed extremely poor conditions for workers. Katō questioned the documentary, and requested that NHK issue a statement that the documentary was misleading as it used footage filmed at other mines and in much later time periods. Opposition groups questioned the validity of the requested NHK clarifications, categorising them as revisionist.

== In popular culture ==
Hashima seen from the sea

In 2002, Swedish filmmaker Thomas Nordanstad visited the island with Dotokou, a Japanese man who grew up on Hashima. Nordanstad documented the trip in a film called Hashima, Japan, 2002.

During the 2009 Mexican photography festival FotoSeptiembre, Mexican photographers Guillaume Corpart Muller and Jan Smith, along with Venezuelan photographer Ragnar Chacin, showcased images from the island in the exhibition "Pop. Density 5,000/km^{2}". The exhibition traced urban density and the rise and fall of cities around the world.

In 2009, the island was featured in History Channel's Life After People, first-season episode "The Bodies Left Behind" as an example of the decay of concrete buildings after only 35 years of abandonment. The island was again featured in 2011 in episode six of a 3D production for 3net, Forgotten Planet, discussing the island's current state, history and unauthorised photo shoots by urban explorers. The Japanese Cultural Institute in Mexico used the images of Corpart Muller and Smith in the photography exhibition "Fantasmas de Gunkanjima", organised by Daniela Rubio, as part of the celebrations surrounding 200 years of diplomacy between Mexico and Japan.

In July 2009, Japanese rock duo B'z shot the music video for their single "My Lonely Town" on the island. This was the first time a large-scale music video had been shot there. Special permission was given from Nagasaki to utilise the entire island for filming, including aerial shots of the island and the band being able to go in areas most visitors wouldn't normally be able to go in.

The island has appeared in a number of feature films. External shots of the island were used in the 2012 James Bond film Skyfall. The 2015 live-action Japanese films based on the manga Attack on Titan used the island for filming multiple scenes, and 2013 Thai horror film Hashima Project was filmed there.

The island is depicted in the comic series Atomic Robo, where it features prominently as a central location in the storylines of Volume 6: The Ghost of Station X, Volume 10: The Ring of Fire, and Volume 12: The Spectre of Tomorrow.

The 2017 South Korean World War II film The Battleship Island (Korean: 군함도; Hanja: 軍艦島; RR: Gunhamdo), featuring Hwang Jung-min and Song Joong-ki, depicts a fictitious attempt by Korean forced labourers to escape the labour camp on the island.

The island appeared in a CNN article entitled "10 of the freakiest places around the world".

A TBS drama The Diamond Sleeping in The Sea (海に眠るダイヤモンド, Umi ni Nemuru Daiyamondo) mainly takes place in the year 1955 of Hashima.

== See also ==
- Anti-Japanese sentiment in Korea
- Anti-Korean sentiment in Japan
- Desert island
- Fort Drum (Philippines)
- Lists of islands
