= Tarami, Nagasaki =

Dissolved municipality in Nagasaki prefecture, Japan

Coordinates: 32°49′53.5″N 129°59′1.3″E

Tarami (多良見町, Tarami-chō) was a town located in Nishisonogi District, Nagasaki Prefecture, Japan.

As of 2003, the town had an estimated population of 16,995 and a density of 448.65 persons per km^{2}. The total area was 37.88 km^{2}.

On March 1, 2005, Tarami, along with the towns of Iimori, Konagai, Moriyama and Takaki (all from Kitatakaki District), was merged into the expanded city of Isahaya.
