= Masaharu Taniguchi =

Japanese founder of the Seicho-No-Ie religion

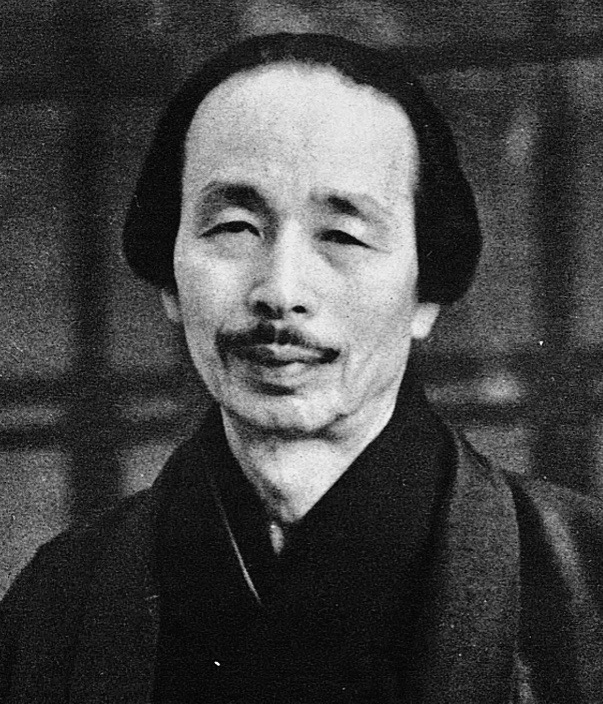
- Masaharu Taniguchi in 1959
- Born: 22 November 1893; Kobe, Japan
- Died: 17 July 1985 (aged 91); Nagasaki, Japan
- Resting place: Tama Cemetery, Fuchu, Japan; 35°40′55″N 139°30′26.7″E
- Other name: 谷口雅春
- Education: University of Waseda
- Known for: Founding Seicho-No-Ie
- Spouse: Teruko Taniguchi

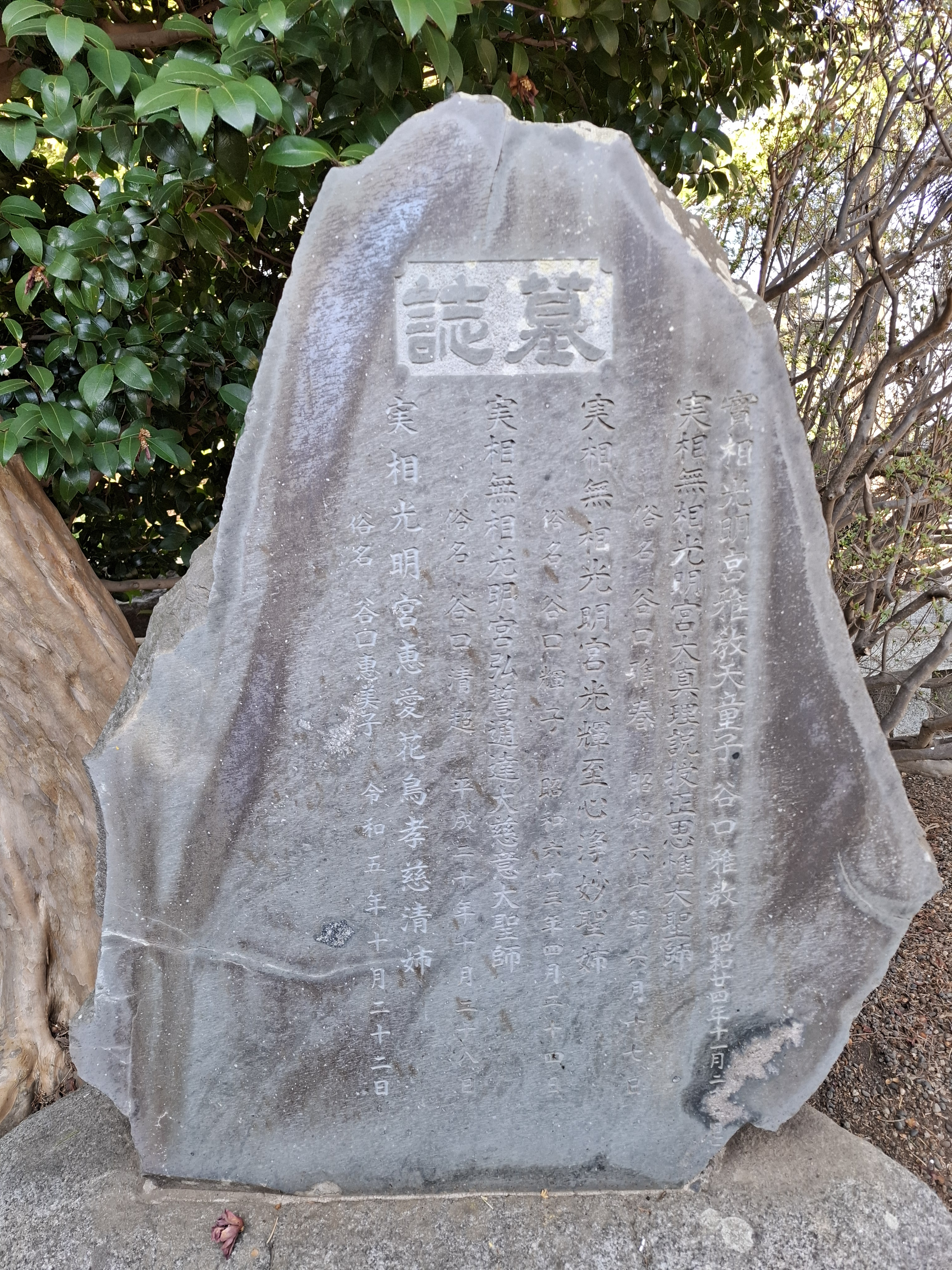
Poem about "Reality (実相)" by Masaharu Taniguchi, engraved on a stone at the Taniguchi family grave in Tama Cemetery

Masaharu Taniguchi (谷口 雅春, Taniguchi Masaharu; 22 November 1893 – 17 June 1985) was a Japanese New Thought leader who was the founder of Seicho-No-Ie.

== Biography ==
Taniguchi began studying English literature at the Waseda University, Tokyo. In parallel, he also studied the works of Fenwicke Holmes, and subsequently translated Holmes' book, The Law of Mind in Action into Japanese. Taniguchi also became a follower of Oomoto, which was led by Onisaburo Deguchi. In 1929, after much study and contemplation, he reported having received a divine revelation followed by the healing of his daughter. This led in 1930 to the creation of a magazine, Seicho-No-Ie ("home of infinite life, wisdom, and abundance"). The movement grew during the 1930s, although it was suppressed during World War II. In 1952, he co-authored a book with Fenwicke Holmes titled The Science of Faith.

Taniguchi died in a Nagasaki hospital on June 17, 1985, at the age of 91. His ashes are buried at both the Seicho-No-Ie Sōhonzan (生長の家総本山) spiritual headquarters in Saikai, Nagasaki (32°59′21″N 129°45′23″E) and at the Taniguchi family grave at Tama Cemetery (35°40′55″N 139°30′26.7″E).

== Bibliography ==
- Truth of Life, Vol. 1 (1937, first reprinted in 1961, reprinted in 1979 as Truth of Life, Vol. 1: The Magic of Truth, later reprinted as Truth of Life, Vol. 1: Book of General Principles)
- The Science of Faith: How to Make Yourself Believe (1952, reprinted in 1962)
- Divine Education and Spiritual Training of Mankind (1956)
- You Can Heal Yourself: Conquest of Diseases, Cancer, Atomic Disease, etc. through Spiritual Teachings (1961)
- Recovery from All Diseases: Seicho-no-Ie's Method of Psychoanalysis (1963)
- Truth of Life, Vol. 3: Spiritual Key to Abundant Life (1971)
- The Human Mind and Cancer (1972)
- 365 Golden Keys to the Summit of Fulfillment (1974, reprinted as 365 Golden Keys to a Completely Free Life)
- Truth of Life, Vol. 5: The Mystical Power Within (1975, reprinted as Truth of Life, Vol. 5: Book of the Holy Spirit, Part 1)
- Truth of Life, Vol. 7: Wondrous Way to Infinite Life and Power (1977, reprinted as Truth of Life, Vol. 7: Book of Daily Life)
- Truth of Life, Vol. 2: The Spiritual Essence of Man (1979)
- The Taniguchi Commentary on the Gospel According to St. John (1988)
- Truth of Life, Vol. 8: Book of Meditative Practices (1989)
- Truth of Life, Vol. 37: Book of Happiness, Part 1
- For Young People
- Life's Reader
- Prayer for Children

== See also ==
- Religious Science
- Roy Eugene Davis
