= Seicho =

Seicho or Seichō may refer to:

- Seicho-no-Ie, a Japanese new religion founded in 1930 by Masaharu Taniguchi
- Seichō Matsumoto (1909–1992), Japanese writer
