= Nishisonogi District, Nagasaki =

District in Nagasaki prefecture, Japan

Coordinates: 32.8317°N 129.868°E

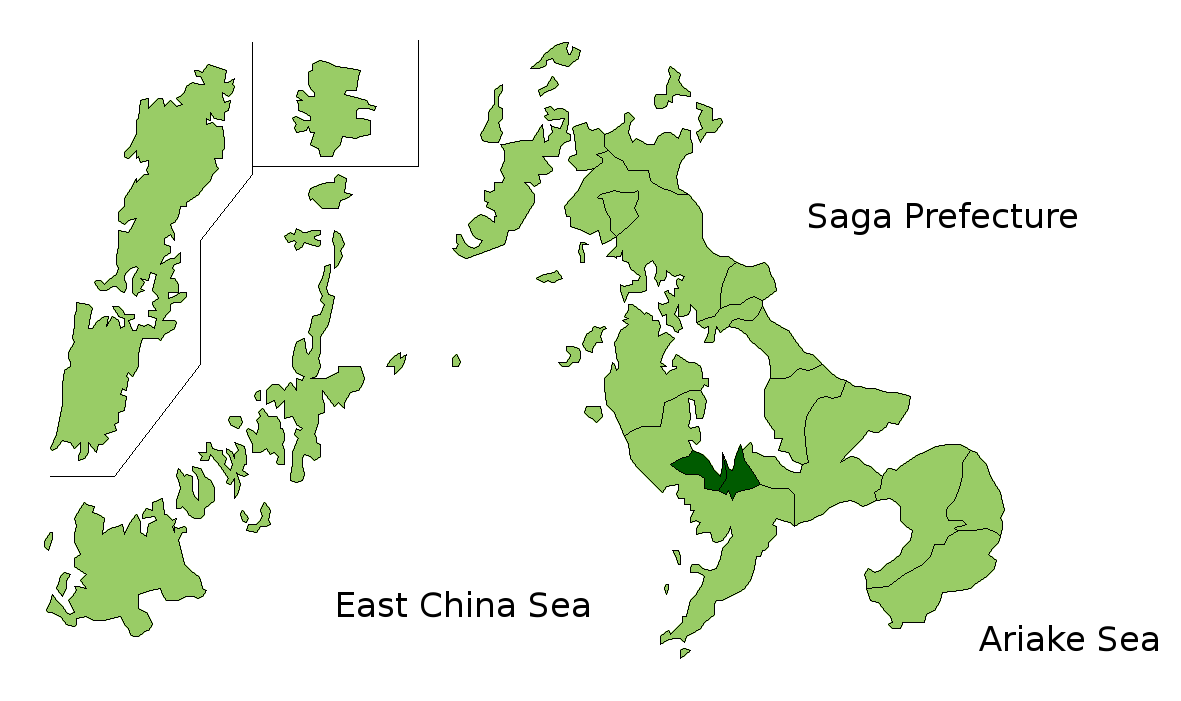
Nishisonogi District in Nagasaki Prefecture

Nishisonogi (西彼杵郡, Nishisonogi-gun) is a district located in Nagasaki Prefecture, Japan.

As of January 1, 2009, the district has an estimated population of 72,238 and a density of 1460 persons per km^{2}. The total area is 49.54 km^{2}.

== Towns and villages ==
- Nagayo
- Togitsu

== Mergers ==
- January 1, 1955 the village of Fukuda merged into the city of Nagasaki.
- On January 4, 2005, six towns, Iōjima, Kōyagi, Nomozaki, Sanwa, Sotome and Takashima merged into the city of Nagasaki.
- On March 1, 2005, the town of Tarami, along with the towns of Iimori, Konagai, Moriyama and Takaki, all from Kitatakaki District, merged into the expanded city of Isahaya.
- On April 1, 2005, the old town of Saikai absorbed the towns of Ōseto, Ōshima, Sakito and Seihi to form the new city of Saikai.
- On January 4, 2006, the town of Kinkai merged into the city of Nagasaki.
