= Iōjima =

Iōjima may refer to:

- An island known as Iwo Jima in English. In Japanese, it is officially known as Iōtō, although at one point it was officially also Iōjima
  - Iōjima, Tokyo, a former village in Tokyo on the same island
- Iōjima, Kagoshima, one of the three islands that forms the village of Mishima, Kagoshima, Japan; one of the Ōsumi Islands
- Iōjima, Nagasaki, a former town in Nagasaki Prefecture, Japan

== See also ==
- Iwo Jima (disambiguation)
