= Iwo Jima (disambiguation) =

Iwo Jima may refer to:

== Places ==
- Iwo Jima, a volcanic island in Japan's Ogasawara Islands chain, now officially called Iōtō in Japanese, that was the scene of the Battle of Iwo Jima (see below) in World War II. Today it belongs to Tokyo, Japan.
- Iōjima, Kagoshima, another volcanic island, also known as Satsuma Iōjima and located in the Satsunan Shotō, an island group south of Kyūshū, Japan.
- Iōjima, Nagasaki, a former town in Nagasaki Prefecture, Japan.

== Events ==
- Battle of Iwo Jima, fought by the United States of America and the Empire of Japan in February and March 1945
  - List of Medal of Honor recipients: World War II: Iwo Jima
  - Category:Battle of Iwo Jima
- Raising the Flag on Iwo Jima, the events that led up to a photograph on February 23, 1945, of the second flag raising on Iwo Jima that won a Pulitzer Prize and became the inspiration for stamps, statues, and paintings
- USMC War Memorial, also known as the Iwo Jima Memorial

== Books ==
- Iwo Jima: Legacy of Valor, 1986 book by Bill Ross
- Iwo Jima: Portrait of a Battle: United States Marines at War in the Pacific, 2006 book by Eric Hammel
- Flags Of Our Fathers, 2000 book by James Bradly and Ron Powers

== Movies & other media ==
- Letters from Iwo Jima, 2006 Golden Globe- and Academy Award-winning war film directed by Clint Eastwood
- Raising the Flag on Iwo Jima, a historic photograph taken on February 23, 1945, by Joe Rosenthal
- Sands of Iwo Jima, 1949 war film which follows a group of Marines from training to the Battle of Iwo Jima during World War II
- To the Shores of Iwo Jima, a 1945 short war film produced by the U.S. Navy and U.S. Marine Corps, documenting the Battle of Iwo Jima
- Flags of Our Fathers (film), 2006 American war film. It is directed by Clint Eastwood. Written by William Broyles, Jr. and Paul Haggis. It is based from the book Flags of Our Fathers
- Iwo Jima (video game), a 1986 strategy video game released by Personal Software Services for home computers

== Military equipment ==
- Iwo Jima-class amphibious assault ship, helicopter landing platform ships (LPH) of the United States Navy
  - Category:Iwo Jima-class amphibious assault ships
- Iwo Jima LORAN-C transmitter, a former LORAN-C transmitter at Iwo Jima, Japan
- USS Iwo Jima (CV-46), a Ticonderoga-class aircraft carrier, construction canceled August 12, 1945
- USS Iwo Jima (LPH-2), an amphibious assault ship, launched September 17, 1960
- USS Iwo Jima (LHD-7), a Wasp-class amphibious assault ship, launched on February 4, 2000

== See also ==
- Iōjima (disambiguation)
