= Konagai, Nagasaki =

Dissolved municipality in Nagasaki prefecture, Japan

Coordinates: 32°55′37.6″N 130°11′24.7″E

Konagai (小長井町, Konagai-chō) was a town located in Kitatakaki District, Nagasaki Prefecture, Japan.

As of 2003, the town had an estimated population of 6,437 and a density of 208.12 persons per km^{2}. The total area was 30.93 km^{2}.

On March 1, 2005, Konagai, along with the town of Tarami (from Nishisonogi District), and the towns of Iimori, Moriyama and Takaki (all from Kitatakaki District), was merged into the expanded city of Isahaya.
