= The Offenders (1921 film) =

1922 film by Margery Wilson

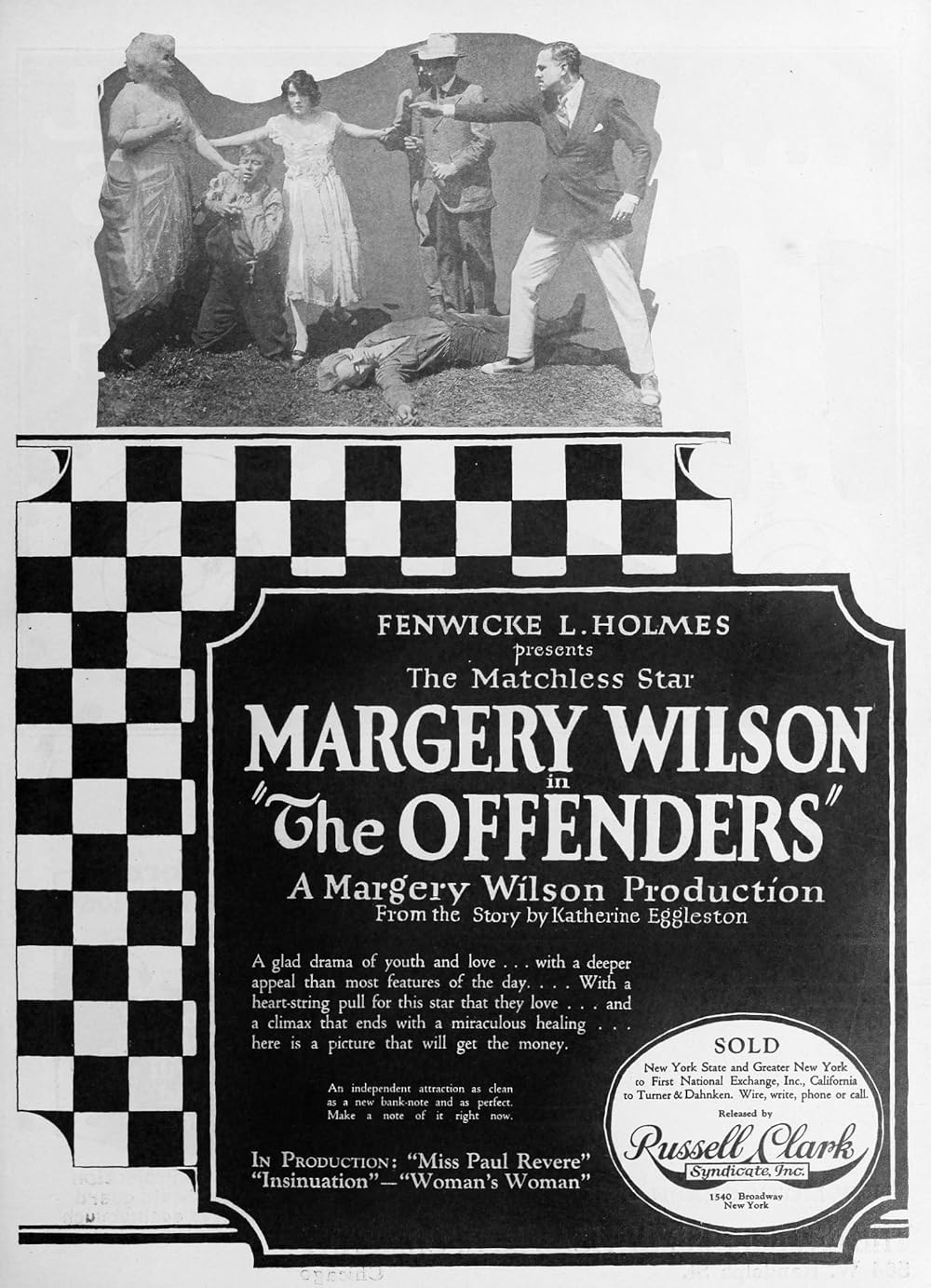
- Directed by: Fenwicke L. Holmes
- Release date: 1921
- Country: United States
- Language: Silent

The Offenders is a 1921 American melodrama film directed by Fenwicke L. Holmes. Margery Wilson, the co-star, reportedly co-directed this and two other films between 1921 and 1924.

The film is frequently mis-dated, either as being released in 1922 or 1924. Contemporary documentation states that it was made in the summer of 1921 and released that November. It was filmed in the town of Randolph, Vermont, with various locals acting as extras. Little else is known about the film, which is suspected to be lost.

What is known is limited to the archives kept in the Chandler Theatre in Randolph (which showed the movie) and the newspaper records of the day. At that time, the newspaper in Randolph was The Herald and Times, which is now just The Herald.

== Plot ==
A girl is held at mercy of gang of crooks, her only friend being a "half-wit". A murder is committed and blame shifted to the girl.

The "half-wit" has seen the murder, but cannot remember. When he is cured, his testimony frees the girl.

== Cast ==
- Margery Wilson
- Percy Helton

== See also ==
- List of films in the public domain in the United States
- List of lost films
