= Seicho-No-Ie =

Japanese new religion

- Seichō no Ie (生長の家)
- The mon of Seicho-No-Ie
- Type: Japanese new religion
- Classification: New Thought
- Scripture: Nectarean Shower of Holy Doctrines (甘露の法雨, Kanro no hōu) (main sutra); Truth of Life (生命の實相, Seimei no jissō) (main doctrinal text)
- President: Masanobu Taniguchi (谷口雅宣)
- Language: Japanese, English, Portuguese, etc.
- Headquarters: Hokuto, Yamanashi (administrative headquarters); Saikai, Nagasaki (main temple); Uji, Kyoto (auxiliary main temple)
- Founder: Masaharu Taniguchi
- Origin: 1930; Japan
- Separated from: Oomoto

Seicho-No-Ie (Japanese: 生長の家, Hepburn: Seichō-no-Ie; "House of Growth") is a syncretic, monotheistic, New Thought Japanese new religion that has spread since the end of World War II in Asia. It emphasizes gratitude for nature, the family, ancestors and, above all, religious faith in one universal God. Seichō-no-Ie is the world's largest New Thought group. By the end of 2010 it had over 1.6 million followers and 442 facilities, mostly located in Japan, Brazil, and the United States.

== History ==
In 1930, Masaharu Taniguchi, working as an English translator, published the first issue of what he called his "non-denominational truth movement magazine", which he named Seichō-no-Ie to help teach others of his beliefs. By 1932, this was followed by forty volumes of his "Truth of Life" philosophy. Over the next forty years, he published an additional four hundred–odd books. He toured many countries in Europe, South America, and North America with his wife, Teruko, to personally lecture on his beliefs. Ernest Holmes, founder of Religious Science, and his brother Fenwicke were of great assistance to Taniguchi. Fenwicke traveled to Japan and co-authored several books, with one called The Science of Faith becoming a cornerstone of the denomination.

Taniguchi died in a Nagasaki hospital on June 17, 1985, at the age of 91. Today, the president of Seichō no Ie is Masanobu Taniguchi (谷口雅宣).

In the 2000s, the Seicho-No-Ie Fundamental Movement (生長の家本流運動) split from the headquarters. As of 2017, there are three factions of the original movement. The two largest factions are led by Masanobu Taniguchi, the president of Seichō-no-Ie, and by a group of elder teachers of Seichō-no-Ie known as Manabushi.

== Scriptures and publications ==
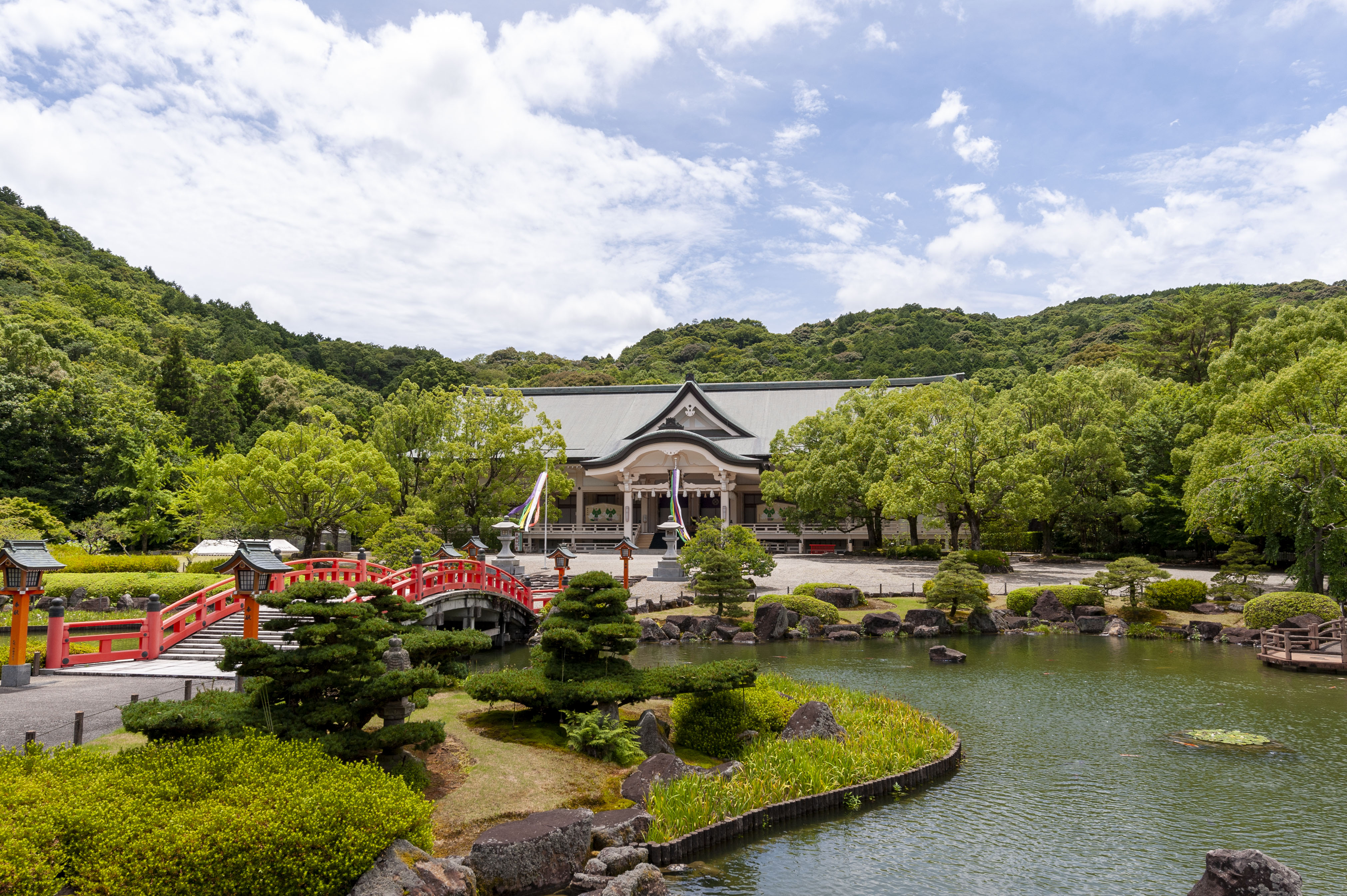
Main temple in Saikai, Nagasaki

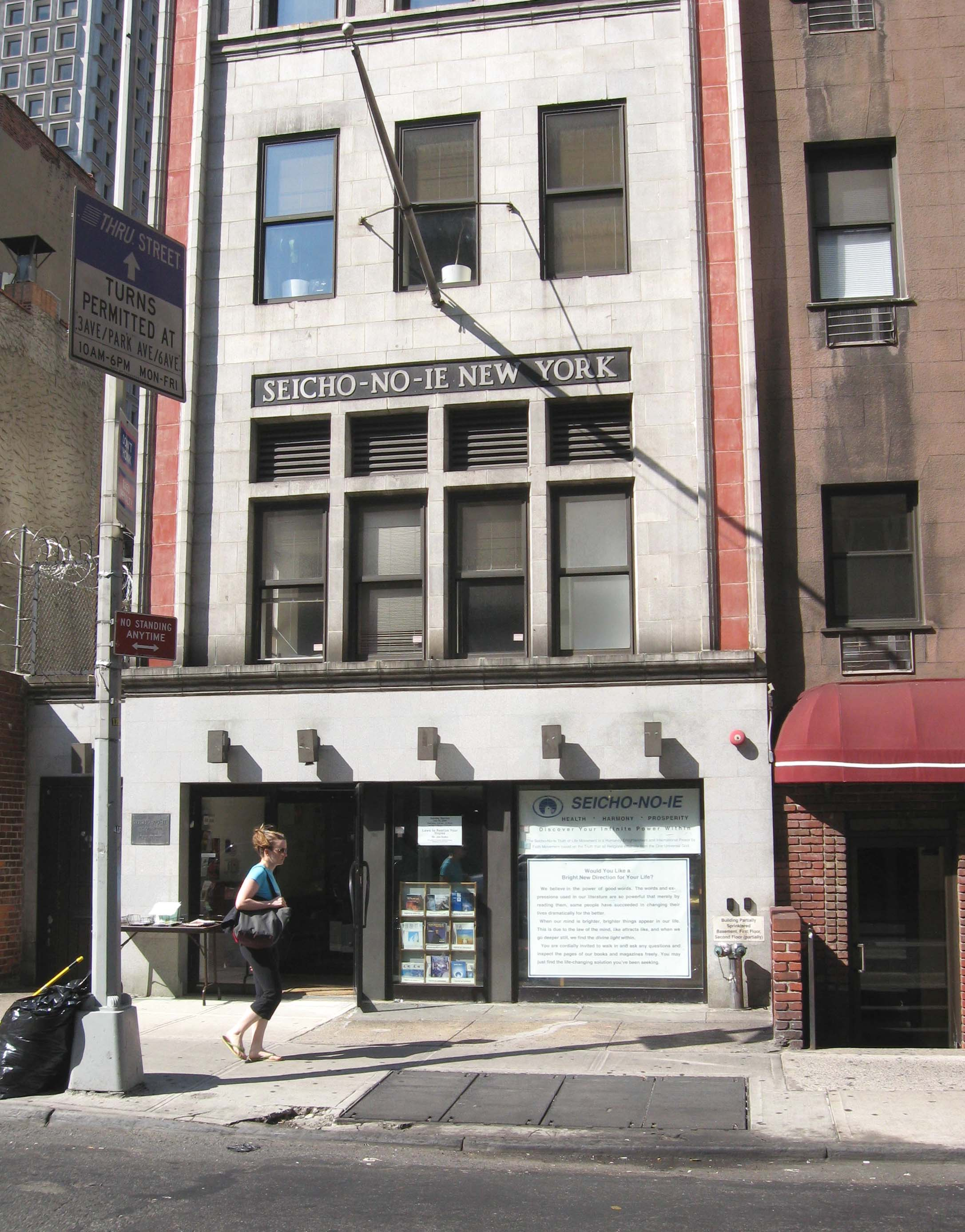
New York City Headquarters, East 53rd Street

The four holy sutras (聖経, seikyō) of Seicho-No-Ie are:

- Nectarean Shower of Holy Doctrines (甘露の法雨, Kanro no Hōu). Taniguchi Masaharu claimed that it was divinely revealed to him by Kannon on December 1, 1930. There are eight sections: God (神), Spirit (霊), Matter (物質), Reality (実在), Wisdom (智慧), Delusion (無明), Sin (罪), and Man (人間). Similar to many Nichiren sects' views of the Lotus Sutra, this sutra is treated as a protective amulet that can be carried, read, or copied for protective benefits. In Uji, Kyoto, there is a hall for followers to copy the sutra.
- Song of the Angel (天使の言葉, Tenshi no Kotoba): consists of the Divine Messages of Eternal Life and the Holy Sutra itself (two sections: Song of the Angel and Song of Eternal Life)
- For Spiritual Healing (続々甘露の法雨, Zoku-zoku Kanro no Hōu) (lit. 'Continuation of the Nectarean Shower of Holy Doctrines'): consists of the Divine Messages of Repentance and the Holy Sutra itself ("For Spiritual Healing")
- Prayerful Song to Praise and Bless the Holy Missioners (聖使命菩薩讃偈, Seishimei Bosatsu Sange)

The following two prayers are typically placed before and after compilations of the four sutras, respectively:

- Invocation (招神歌)
- Song of Reality (実相を観ずる歌)

Other scriptures include:

- Daily Recitation of the Thirty-Chapter Sutra (日々読誦三十章経, Hibi Dokuju Sanjūshōkei)
- Pure Land Revelation Sutra (顕浄土成仏経, Arawa Jōdo Jōbutsukei)
- Great Japan Divine Nation (大日本神国, Dai Nippon Shinkokukan)

Additional prayerbooks:

- Daishizen Sanka (大自然讚歌)
- Hichō Sanka (飛鳥讚歌)
- Kanzeon Bosatsu Sanka (観世音菩薩讚歌)
  - Song in Praise of the Bodhisattva Who Reflects the Sounds of the World (in English)
  - Canto em louvor ao Bodisatva que reflete os sons do mundo (in Portuguese)
- Jinrui Dōhō Daichōwa Rokushōkyō (人類同胞大調和六章経)
- Banbutsu Chōwa Rokushōkyō (万物調和六章経)

The most important texts in Seicho-No-Ie are:

- Truth of Life (生命の實相, Seimei no jissō), which consists of 40 volumes (main edition, 頭注版) published since 1932; this is the religion's most important doctrinal text. There is also an abridged edition (愛蔵版) with 20 volumes.
- The Truth (真理, Shinri), which consists of 11 volumes, was initially published from 1954 to 1958. It summaries key doctrines mentioned in the Truth of Life.

Seicho-No-Ie publishes a newspaper called Seishimei "聖使命, Sacred Mission"). It also publishes three magazines:

- Inochi no wa (いのちの環, "Circle of Life") for general readers
- Shirohato (白鳩, "White Dove") for women
- Hidokei 24 (日時計24, "Sundial 24") for young readers

== Beliefs and practices ==
Seicho-No-Ie is a syncretic religion that incorporates concepts and terminology from Buddhism, Christianity, and other religions. The religion teaches belief in the "single absolute divinity" (唯一絶対の神, yuiitsu zettai no kami). The main kami enshrined in Seicho-No-Ie's shrines is Ame-no-Minakanushi. One of their proverbs is "Be grateful for everything in the world" (天地の万物に感謝せよ, tenchi no manbutsu ni kansha seyo). Seicho-No-Ie's other basic teachings are:

- "Only God is reality" (唯神実相, yuishin jissō)
- "Only the mind affects phenomena" (唯心所現, yuishin shogen) (a key tenet of New Thought denominations)
- "All religions are one" (万教帰一, bankyō kītsu)

The Seven Promulgations of Light (七つの燈臺) is one of the main doctrines of Seicho-No-Ie. At Seicho-No-Ie's Sōhonzan head temple in Saikai, Nagasaki, there are seven stone lanterns representing the Seven Promulgations of Light.

=== Shinsōkan meditation ===
Meditation in Seicho-No-Ie is called shinsōkan (神想観), of which one type is inori-ai shinsōkan (祈り合い神想観, lit. 'shinsōkan as prayer for one another'). There is also the prayer for world peace (世界平和の祈り, sekai heiwa no inori).

Shinsōkan meditation originates from a type of meditative technique called chinkon kishin (鎮魂帰神), which was widely practiced in the Oomoto religion from 1916 to 1921.

== Associations ==
Some Seicho-No-Ie member associations are:

- Seinen-kai 青年会 (Youth and Young Adult Association), founded in 1948
- Sōai-kai 相愛会 (Brotherhood Association; lit. 'Mutual Love Association'), for middle-aged men
- Shirohato-kai 白鳩会 (women's organization), founded in February 1936
  - Shiyū-kai 誌友会, small women's groups that are magazine study groups for discussing Shirohatokai's monthly magazine Shirohato
- Chichi-oya kyōshitsu 父親教室 (fathers' study groups)
- Haha-oya kyōshitsu 母親教室 (mothers' study groups)

== Education ==
Higher educational institutions include Seichō-no-Ie Yōshin Joshi Gakuen (生長の家養心女子学園), a tertiary young women's boarding school in Yamanashi Prefecture that was founded in 1954.

== Locations ==
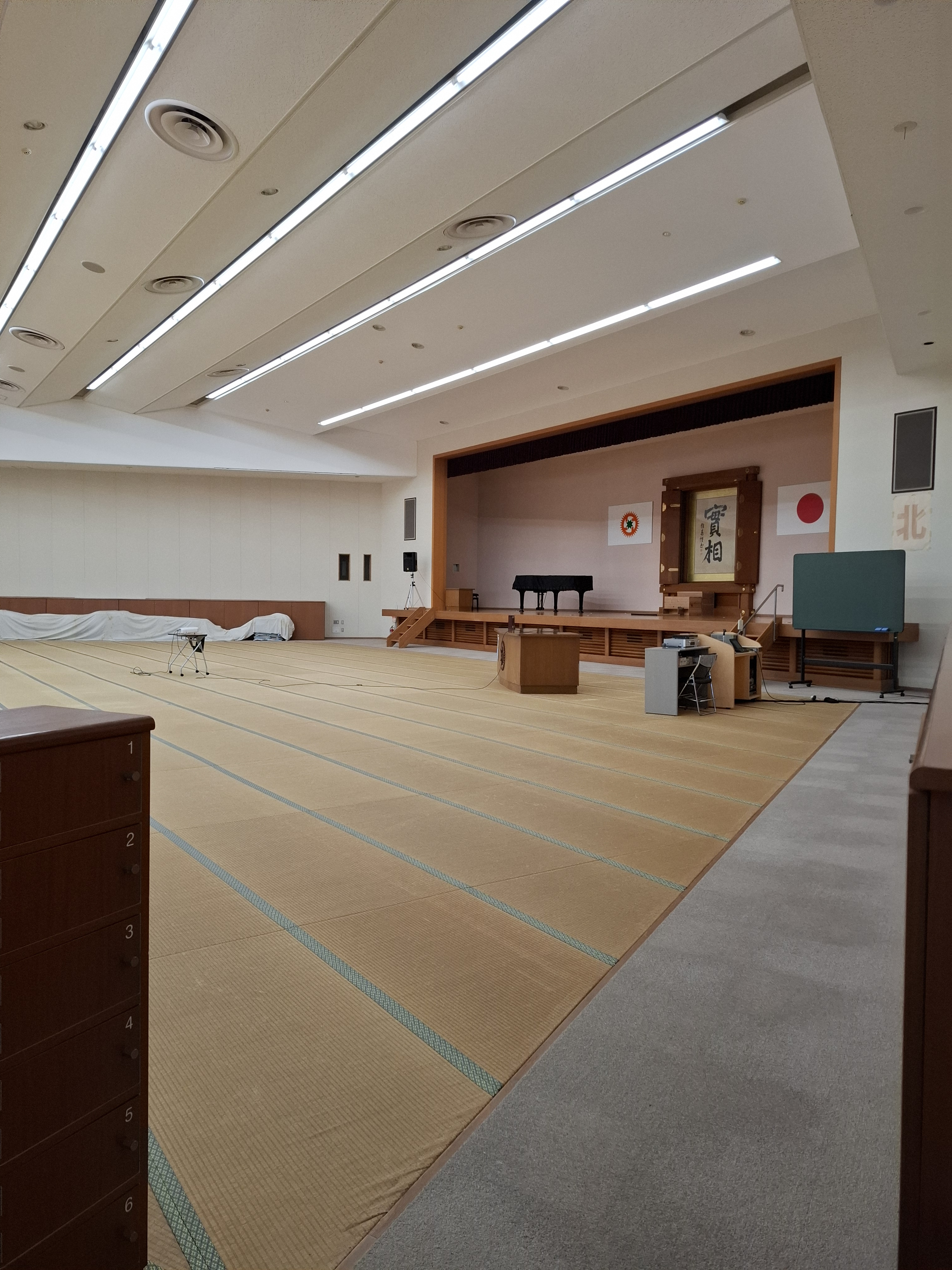
Shinsokan meditation hall at the Seicho-No-Ie Tobitakyu Dojo in Tokyo. The kyūjitai (old-style kanji) characters 實相 (lit. 'Reality') can be seen at the center of the hall's altar, flanked by the Japanese flag on the right and Seicho-No-Ie's flag on the left.

Seicho-No-Ie has centers in the following locations.

- Japan
  - The Office in the Forest (森の中のオフィス, Mori no naka no ofisu) is Seicho-No-Ie's international administrative headquarters, located in Hokuto, Yamanashi near Kai-Ōizumi Station at the foot of Mount Aka.
  - Sōhonzan (生長の家総本山), Seicho-No-Ie's spiritual headquarters in Saikai, Nagasaki, hosts Ryūgū Sumiyoshi Hongū (龍宮住吉本宮), the religion's head temple where ancestral rites are performed. Established on November 21, 1978, the temple enshrines Sumiyoshi Daijin (住吉大神) and other Shinto kami. Prominent members of the Taniguchi family, including Masaharu Taniguchi, are buried at Sōhonzan. Sōhonzan has a garden, museum, and seven large stone lanterns representing the Seven Promulgations of Light (七つの燈臺).
  - Uji Bekkaku Honzan (宇治別格本山), a special head temple (or additional main temple) in Uji, Kyoto. It is located just to the southeast of Byōdō-in, within walking distance. Hōzō Shrine (宝蔵神社, Hōzo Jinja) is located inside the temple complex. Every August, the Memorial Festival (盂蘭盆供養大祭, Urabon kuyō taisai) (annual ancestor ceremony) is held at this temple.
  - Tobitakyū Dōjō near Tobitakyū Station in Chōfu, Tokyo, with facilities similar to those of Uji Bekkaku Honzan. It is a round building resembling a tulou and has a shinsokan meditation hall, library, bookstore, cafeteria, administrative offices, dormitories, and various other facilities within a single building.
- United States: Gardena, California (US headquarters); Manhattan, New York; North Miami Beach; Fort Lauderdale; Denver; Seattle; Honolulu. In Florida, Seicho-No-Ie members are mainly from the Brazilian community.
- Canada: Toronto and Vancouver
- Brazil: Jabaquara, São Paulo (Brazil and Latin America headquarters)
- Germany: Frankfurt
- Taiwan: Taipei
- Hong Kong

== See also ==
- List of New Thought denominations and independent centers
- List of New Thought writers
- New religious movements
