= Ōshima, Nagasaki (Nishisonogi) =

Dissolved municipality in Nagasaki prefecture, Japan

Ōshima (大島町, Ōshima-chō) was a town located in Nishisonogi District, Nagasaki Prefecture, Japan.

As of 2003, the town had an estimated population of 6,046 and a density of 453.56 persons per km^{2}. The total area was 13.33 km^{2}.

On April 1, 2005, Ōshima, along with the towns of Saikai (former), Ōseto, Sakito and Seihi (all from Nishisonogi District), was merged to create the city of Saikai.
