= Iimori, Nagasaki =

Dissolved municipality in Kitatakaki district, Nagasaki prefecture, Japan

Coordinates: 34°15′N 135°26′E

Iimori (飯盛町, Iimori-chō) was a town located in Kitatakaki District, Nagasaki Prefecture, Japan.

As of 2003, the town had an estimated population of 7,979 and a density of 321.35 persons per km^{2}. The total area was 24.83 km^{2}.

On March 1, 2005, Iimori, along with the town of Tarami (from Nishisonogi District), and the towns of Konagai, Moriyama and Takaki (all from Kitatakaki District), was merged into the expanded city of Isahaya.
