= Takaki, Nagasaki =

Dissolved municipality in Nagasaki prefecture, Japan

Takaki (高来町, Takaki-chō) was a town located in Kitatakaki District, Nagasaki Prefecture, Japan.

As of 2003, the town had an estimated population of 10,912 and a density of 219.16 persons per km^{2}. The total area was 49.79 km^{2}.

On March 1, 2005, Takaki, along with the town of Tarami (from Nishisonogi District), and the towns of Iimori, Konagai and Moriyama (all from Kitatakaki District), was merged into the expanded city of Isahaya.
