= Ōseto, Nagasaki =

Dissolved municipality in Nagasaki prefecture, Japan

Coordinates: 32°55′58.6″N 129°38′35.5″E

Ōseto (大瀬戸町, Ōseto-chō) was a town located in Nishisonogi District, Nagasaki Prefecture, Japan.

As of 2003, the town had an estimated population of 7,577 and a density of 96.25 persons per km^{2}. The total area was 78.72 km^{2}.

On April 1, 2005, Ōseto, along with the towns of Saikai (former), Ōshima, Sakito and Seihi (all from Nishisonogi District), was merged to create the city of Saikai.
