= Seihi, Nagasaki =

Dissolved municipality in Nagasaki prefecture, Japan

Seihi (西彼町, Seihi-chō) was a town located in Nishisonogi District, Nagasaki Prefecture, Japan.

== Population ==
As of 2003, Seihi had an estimated population of 9,794 and a density of 143.00 persons per km^{2}. The total area was 68.49 km^{2}.

== History ==
On April 1, 2005, Seihi was merged with the towns of Saikai (old), Ōseto, Ōshima and Sakito (all from Nishisonogi District), was merged to create the city of Saikai.

== Geography ==
Seihi was a long, narrow town running along the west side of Ōmura Bay; it occupies most of the northeastern part of the Nishisonogi Peninsula. Seihi was bordered on the south by Kinkai (in the city of Nagasaki), on the west by Oseto and on the north by Saikai (both of which are in Saikai). On the northeastern edge of Seihi is Saikai Bridge, part of Routes 202 and 206, which takes motorists to Hario in the city of Sasebo. The Pearl Line Expressway, a toll road with bridge, was completed in 2006. This route ends near the Huis Ten Bosch theme park.

== Economy ==
The backbone of Seihi is agriculture, with major crops including lotus root, grapes, and watermelon. Route 206, winding through Seihi, features numerous farmers' markets which attract shoppers from the nearby cities of Sasebo and Nagasaki. The waters of the Ōmura Bay are also filled with oyster farms, both the pearl-yielding and culinary varieties. There is also a thriving local fishing industry, and the waters around Seihi are the source of sea cucumbers, among other fish and shellfish, which find their way into fish markets in Nagasaki.

== Miscellaneous ==
Seihi is well known in the region for a type of firm glutinous rice mixed with mugwort known as yomogi kankoro (蓬かんころ).
