= Moriyama, Nagasaki =

Former town in Japan

Coordinates: 32°49′55.8″N 130°7′44″E

Moriyama (森山町, Moriyama-chō) was a town located in Kitatakaki District, Nagasaki Prefecture, Japan.

As of 2003, the town had an estimated population of 6,154 and a density of 264.57 persons per km^{2}. The total area was 23.26 km^{2}.

On March 1, 2005, Moriyama, along with the town of Tarami (from Nishisonogi District), and the towns of Iimori, Konagai and Takaki (all from Kitatakaki District), was merged into the expanded city of Isahaya.
