= Sakito, Nagasaki =

Dissolved municipality in Nishisonogi district, Nagasaki prefecture, Japan

Coordinates: 33°00′N 129°33′E

Sakito (崎戸町, Sakito-chō) was a town in Nishisonogi District, Nagasaki Prefecture, Japan.

== Population ==
As of 2003, the town had an estimated population of 2,126 and a density of 150.57 persons per km^{2}. The total area was 14.12 km^{2}.

== History ==
On April 1, 2005, Sakito, along with the towns of Saikai (former), Ōseto, Ōshima and Seihi (all from Nishisonogi District), was merged to create the city of Saikai.
