= Vaux-sur-Aure =

- Commune
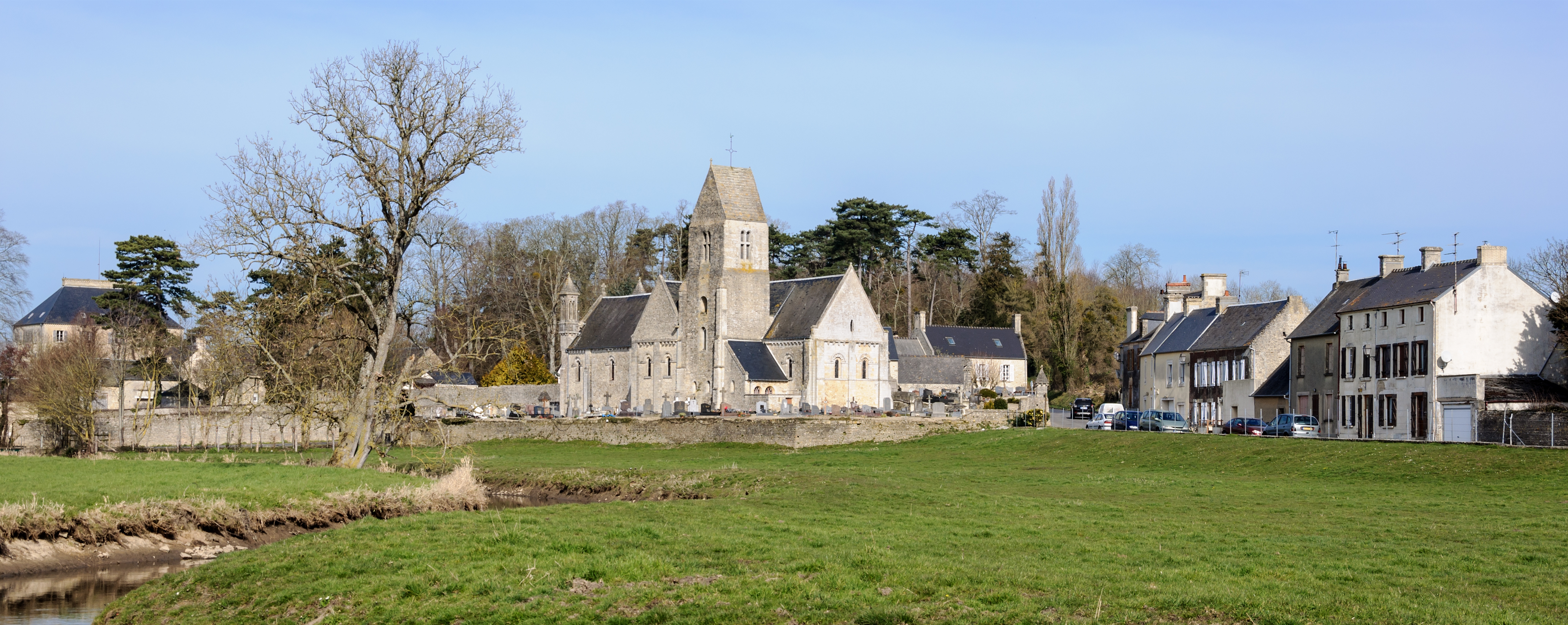
- A general view of Vaux-sur-Aure

- Coat of arms
- Location of Vaux-sur-Aure
- Location within France Location within Normandy
- Coordinates: 49°18′11″N 0°42′03″W
- Country: France
- Region: Normandy
- Department: Calvados
- Arrondissement: Bayeux
- Canton: Bayeux
- Intercommunality: CC Bayeux Intercom

Government
  - Mayor (2020–2026): Benoît Demoulins
- Area^{1}: 7.60 km^{2} (2.93 sq mi)
- Elevation: 33 m (108 ft)
- Highest elevation: 58 m (190 ft)
- Lowest elevation: 19 m (62 ft)
- Population (2023): 286
  - Density: 37.6/km^{2} (97.5/sq mi)
- Time zone: UTC+01:00 (CET)
  - Summer (DST): UTC+02:00 (CEST)
- INSEE/Postal code: 14732 /14400
- ^{1} French Land Register data, which excludes lakes, ponds, glaciers > 1 km^{2} (0.386 sq mi or 247 acres) and river estuaries.

Vaux-sur-Aure (French pronunciation: [vo syʁ oʁ], literally Vaux on Aure) is a commune in the Calvados department in the Normandy region in northwestern France.

The Barons de Gratot (Argouges) resided at the Château de Gratot in Vaux-sur-Aure. According to the French Wikipedia a legend is that a Lord of Argouges met a Fairy woman who agreed to be his wife provided he never spoke the word "Mort" [death] which was considered profane language; however he spoke it and the Fairy vanished; this legend is associated with both Château de Gratot and the Château de Argouges at Argouges.

Coat of arms of the Barons de Gratot (Argouges)

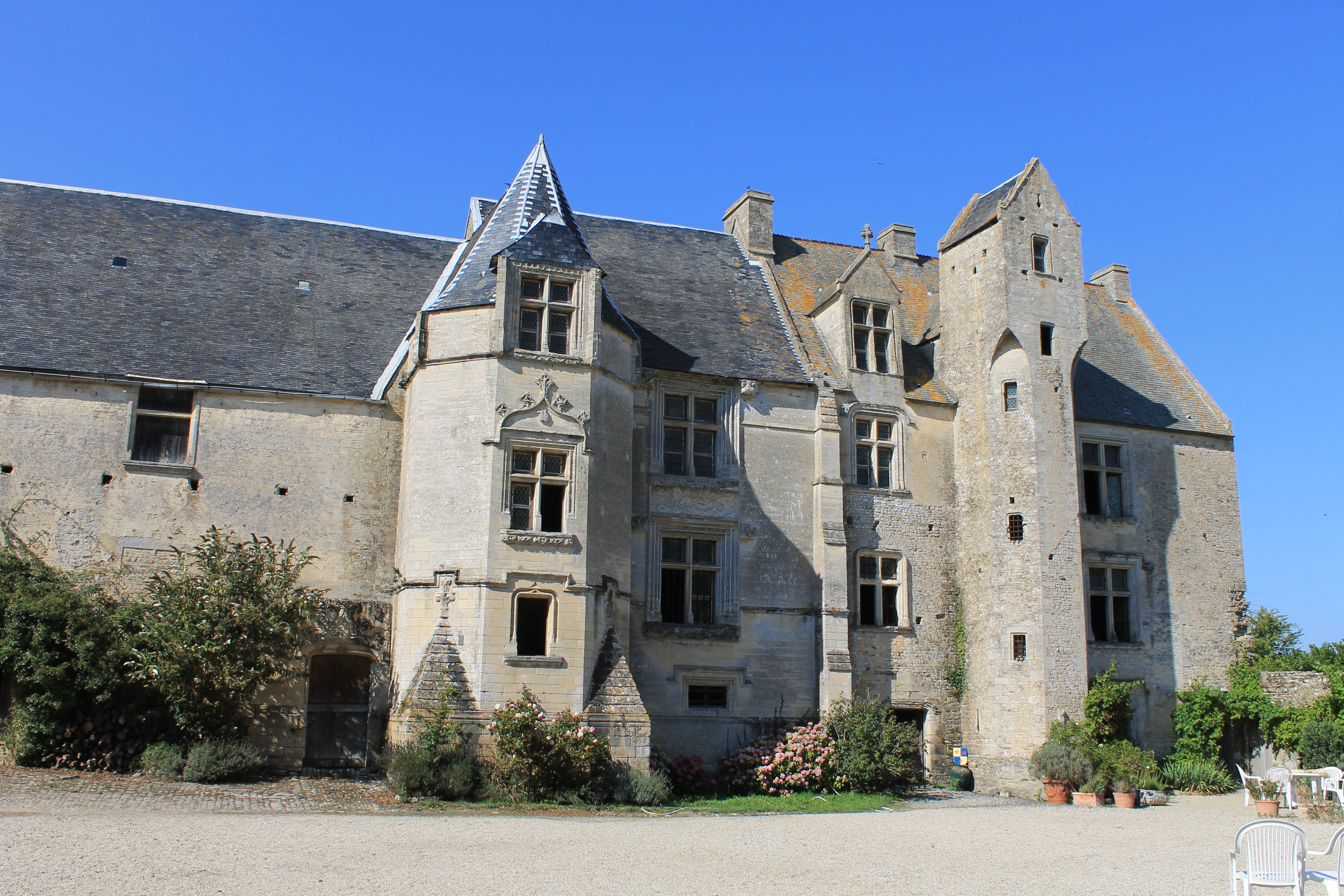
Château d'Argouges in Vaux-sur-Aure.

== Population ==
Historical population
Year	Pop.	±% p.a.
1968	250	—
1975	296	+2.44%
1982	318	+1.03%
1990	324	+0.23%
1999	344	+0.67%
2007	311	−1.25%
2012	332	+1.32%
2017	336	+0.24%
2023	286	−2.65%
Source: INSEE

== International relations ==
Vaux-sur-Aure has international relations with the city of Nagasaki, Japan, since 2005. It was a sister city of Sotome, now a subdivision of Nagasaki, since 1978.

== See also ==
- Communes of the Calvados department
