= Koyagi, Nagasaki =

Dissolved municipality in Nagasaki prefecture, Japan

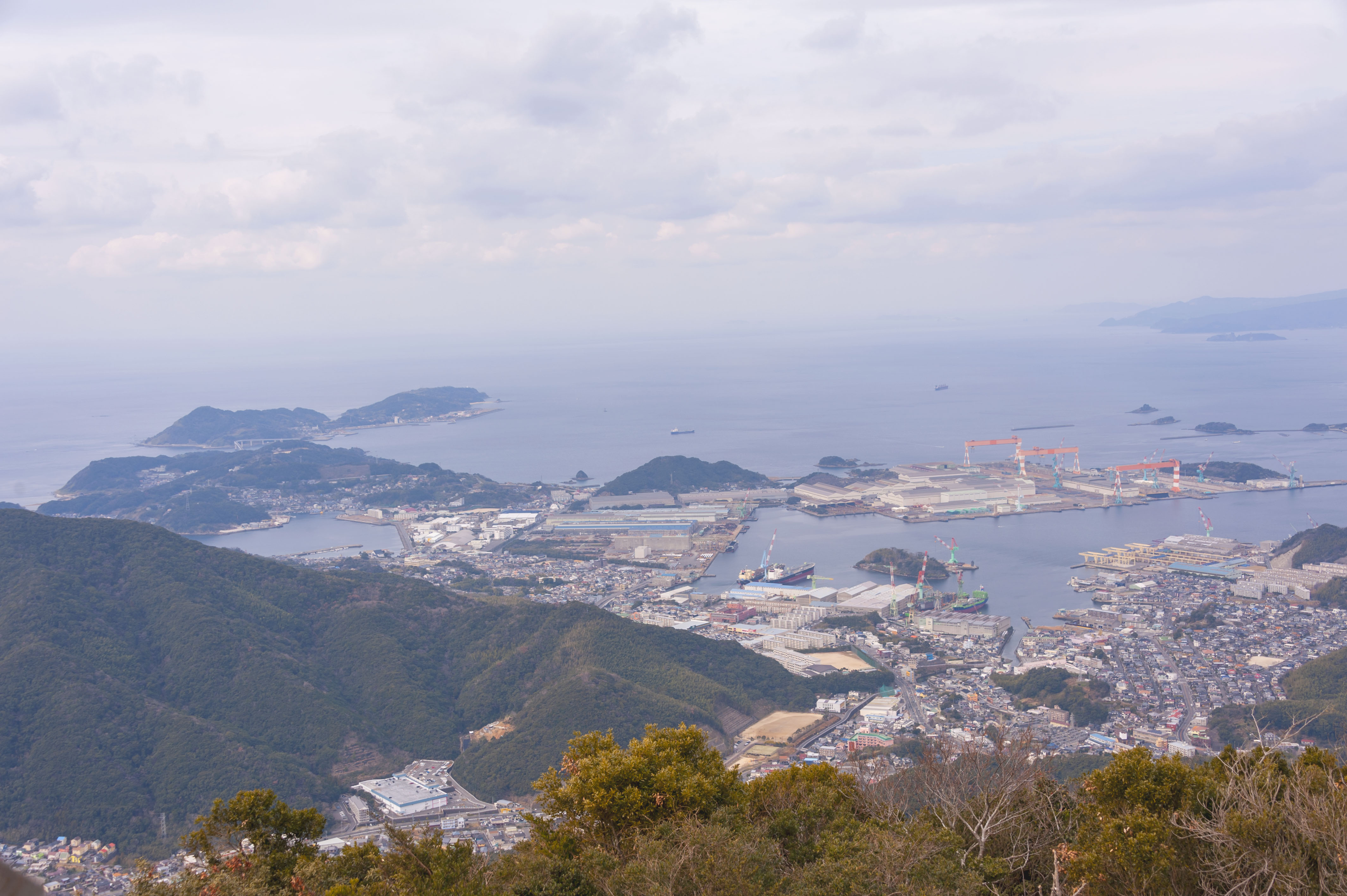
Koyagi viewed from Mount Hachirou

Kōyagi (香焼町, Kōyagi-chō) was a town located in Nishisonogi District, Nagasaki Prefecture, Japan, situated approximately 13 km south of the centre of Nagasaki City. The town was notable for the Mitsubishi shipyard which occupies 60% of urban areas.

As of 2003, the town had an estimated population of 4,261 and a density of 944.79 persons per km^{2}. The total area was 4.51 km^{2}.

On January 4, 2005, Kōyagi, along with the towns of Iōjima, Nomozaki, Sanwa, Sotome and Takashima (all from Nishisonogi District), was merged into the expanded city of Nagasaki and no longer exists as an independent municipality.

The main centre of population was located in the north western side from the Eri area to the Nagahama (shipyard) area. The centre of this is the Sato and Fukaura area where the elementary and junior high schools are located. Other buildings in these areas includes a small hospital, a kindergarten, the town hall and a library. A park and viewpoint is located in the centre of Koyagi from which fine views of Nagasaki city and the peninsular can be seen. Two small beaches are located in the Onoue and Tatsunokuchi areas. The southern Tatsunokuchi beach is famous locally for its scuba diving.

A strong tradition of Peron dragon boat racing exists in Kōyagi and in recent years the town team has won the Nagasaki Peron Festival several times.

== History ==
In 1936 Toyosaku Kawanami bought the Matsuo Shipyard in Kōyagi and transformed it into one of the largest in the Far East. During World War II, a POW camp, Fukuoka #2 was located in Kōyagi and the prisoners were forced to work in brutal conditions in the factories. However, soon after the war was over Kawanami was forced to close the factories due to a shortage of money. ⟨⟩⟩ In 1967, Mitsubishi Heavy Industries acquired the old shipyard facility and started a process of development to create the largest dock in Japan. Completed in 1972, the construction created vast areas of land which attached the island to the mainland.

On March 27, 2011 the Iōjima Bridge was opened to link Kōyagi with the nearby island of Iōjima. This two-step process involves construction of a tunnel from the Eri area to the southern side of the town to link with a new bridge connecting the towns.
