= Sanwa, Nagasaki =

Dissolved municipality in Nagasaki prefecture, Japan

Sanwa (三和町, Sanwa-chō) was a town located in Nishisonogi District, Nagasaki Prefecture, Japan.

== Population ==
As of 2003, the town had an estimated population of 11,883 and a population density of 546.60 persons per km^{2}. The total area was 21.74 km^{2}.

== History ==
On January 4, 2005, Sanwa, along with the towns of Iōjima, Kōyagi, Nomozaki, Sotome and Takashima (all from Nishisonogi District), was merged into the expanded city of Nagasaki and no longer exists as an independent municipality.
