= Sotome, Nagasaki =

Dissolved municipality in Nishisonogi district, Nagasaki prefecture, Japan

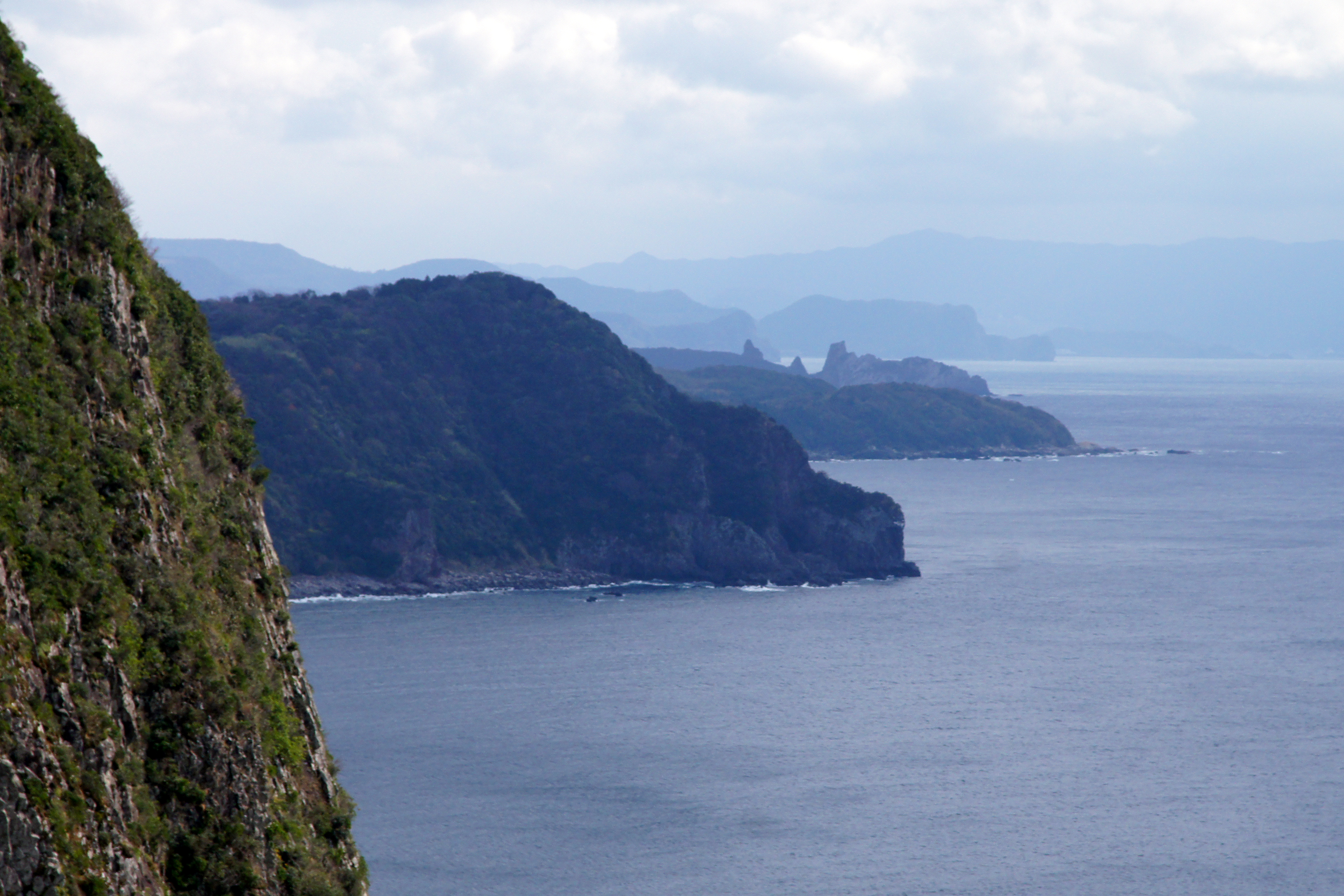
Ar Sotome

Sotome (外海町, Sotome-chō) was a town located in Nishisonogi District, Nagasaki Prefecture, Japan.

As of 2003, the town had an estimated population of 5,412 and a density of 116.09 persons per km^{2}. The total area was 46.62 km^{2} (18.00 sq mi).

On January 4, 2005, Sotome, along with the towns of Iōjima, Kōyagi, Nomozaki, Sanwa and Takashima (all from Nishisonogi District), was merged into the expanded city of Nagasaki and no longer exists as an independent municipality.

== Twin towns ==
Sotome is twinned with:

- Vaux-sur-Aure, France
