= Nomozaki, Nagasaki =

Dissolved municipality in Nagasaki prefecture, Japan

Nomozaki (野母崎町, Nomozaki-chō) was a town located in Nishisonogi District, Nagasaki Prefecture, Japan.

As of 2003, the town had an estimated population of 7,528 and a density of 359.68 persons per km^{2}. The total area was 20.93 km^{2}.

On January 4, 2005, Nomozaki, along with the towns of Iōjima, Kōyagi, Sanwa, Sotome and Takashima (all from Nishisonogi District), was merged into the expanded city of Nagasaki and no longer exists as an independent municipality.

== Climate ==
Climate data for Nomozaki (1991−2020 normals, extremes 1991−present)
Month	Jan	Feb	Mar	Apr	May	Jun	Jul	Aug	Sep	Oct	Nov	Dec	Year
Record high °C (°F)	20.0 (68.0)	21.6 (70.9)	22.1 (71.8)	26.1 (79.0)	28.1 (82.6)	32.1 (89.8)	35.1 (95.2)	36.0 (96.8)	35.4 (95.7)	34.3 (93.7)	26.4 (79.5)	22.1 (71.8)	36.0 (96.8)
Mean daily maximum °C (°F)	9.8 (49.6)	11.0 (51.8)	14.0 (57.2)	18.2 (64.8)	21.8 (71.2)	24.3 (75.7)	28.1 (82.6)	30.4 (86.7)	27.4 (81.3)	22.7 (72.9)	17.4 (63.3)	12.3 (54.1)	19.8 (67.6)
Daily mean °C (°F)	7.0 (44.6)	7.7 (45.9)	10.3 (50.5)	14.3 (57.7)	18.1 (64.6)	21.1 (70.0)	24.9 (76.8)	26.4 (79.5)	23.5 (74.3)	19.1 (66.4)	14.2 (57.6)	9.3 (48.7)	16.3 (61.4)
Mean daily minimum °C (°F)	4.7 (40.5)	5.0 (41.0)	7.4 (45.3)	11.4 (52.5)	15.4 (59.7)	19.0 (66.2)	23.0 (73.4)	24.0 (75.2)	21.1 (70.0)	16.6 (61.9)	11.8 (53.2)	6.8 (44.2)	13.9 (56.9)
Record low °C (°F)	−3.9 (25.0)	−2.8 (27.0)	−1.0 (30.2)	3.8 (38.8)	9.0 (48.2)	13.5 (56.3)	15.4 (59.7)	17.9 (64.2)	13.5 (56.3)	7.8 (46.0)	3.1 (37.6)	−1.1 (30.0)	−3.9 (25.0)
Average precipitation mm (inches)	61.1 (2.41)	69.4 (2.73)	107.8 (4.24)	130.8 (5.15)	132.6 (5.22)	286.1 (11.26)	220.9 (8.70)	163.2 (6.43)	166.6 (6.56)	92.9 (3.66)	99.5 (3.92)	67.0 (2.64)	1,603 (63.11)
Average precipitation days (≥ 1.0 mm)	9.4	8.3	9.8	9.4	9.2	13.0	9.9	9.1	8.7	6.5	8.9	9.0	111.2
Mean monthly sunshine hours	102.6	131.7	173.3	198.6	203.9	137.9	215.1	248.0	195.9	201.1	148.6	117.3	2,074
Source: JMA
