= Takashima, Nagasaki (Nishisonogi) =

Former town in Nagasaki Prefecture, Japan

Takashima, Nagasaki

Takashima (高島町, Takashima-chō; Japanese pronunciation: [tä̀.kä́.ɕì.mä̀, -ɕí.mä́(.c̟͡ɕò̞ò̞)]) was a town located in Nishisonogi District, Nagasaki, Japan. The town included the Island of Gunkanjima.

== Population ==
As of 2003, the town had an estimated population of 791 and a density of 590.30 people per km^{2}. The total area was 1.34 km^{2}.

Previously the town had been much more heavily populated until the abandonment of Gunkanjima island in 1974.

== History ==
On January 4, 2005, Takashima, along with the towns of Iōjima, Kōyagi, Nomozaki, Sanwa and Sotome (all from Nishisonogi District), was merged into the expanded city of Nagasaki and no longer exists as an independent municipality.

== Geography ==
Pre-merger Takashima had consisted of the following four Islands (order is from north to south).

- Tobishima Island
- Takashima Island
- Nakanoshima Island
- Hashima Island (Gunkanjima)
