= Saikai, Nagasaki =

Saikai 西海市
- City
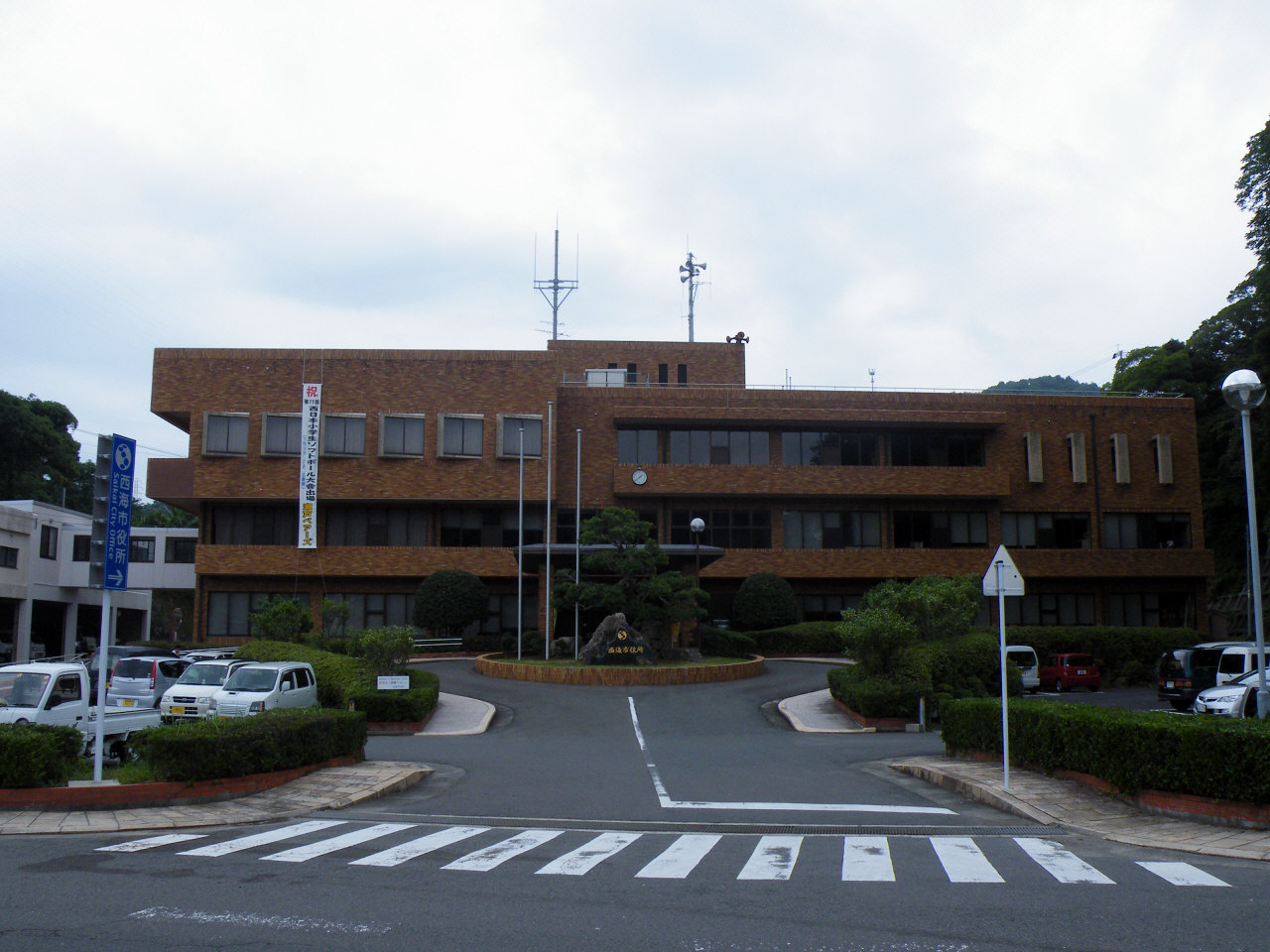
- Saikai City Hall

- Flag Seal
- Location of Saikai in Nagasaki Prefecture

- Location in Japan
- Coordinates: 32°55′59″N 129°38′35″E
- Country: Japan
- Region: Kyushu
- Prefecture: Nagasaki

Area
  - Total: 241.84 km^{2} (93.37 sq mi)

Population (June 30, 2024)
  - Total: 25,184
  - Density: 104.13/km^{2} (269.71/sq mi)
- Time zone: UTC+09:00 (JST)
- City hall address: 2222 Seto-kashiura-go, Oseto-cho, Saikai-shi, Nagasaki-ken 857-2302
- Climate: Cfa
- Website: Official website
- Symbols
- Bird: Japanese bush warbler
- Fish: Sebastiscus marmoratus
- Flower: Hibiscus hamabo
- Tree: Hibiscus hamabo

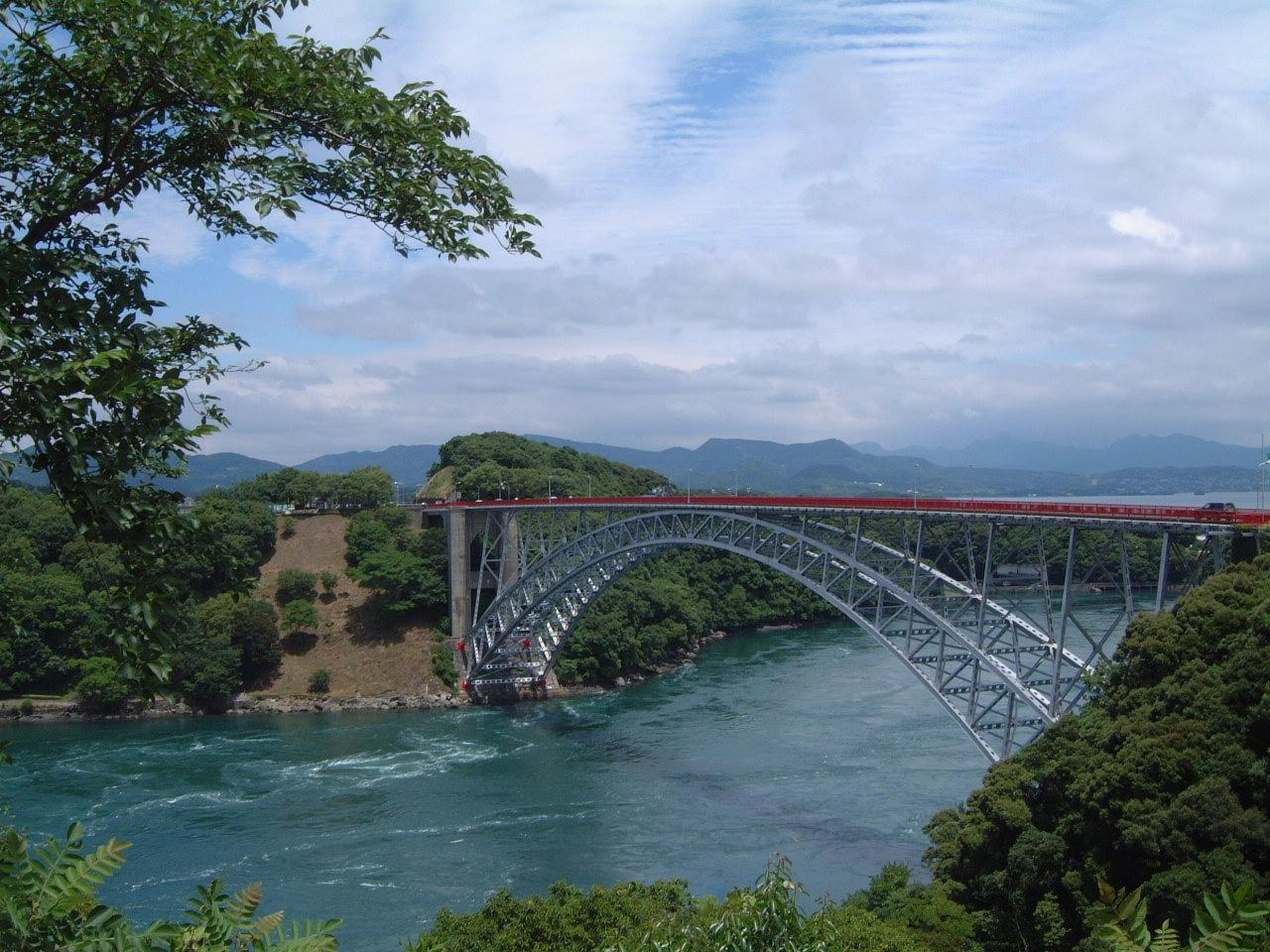
Saikai Bridge

Saikai (西海市, Saikai-shi; Japanese pronunciation: [sai.kai, -kaꜜi.ɕi]) is a city located in Nagasaki Prefecture, Japan.

== Population ==
As of 30 June 2024, the city had an estimated population of 25,184 in 12447 households, and a population density of 100 people per km^{2}. The total area of the city is 241.84 km^{2} (93.37 sq mi).

== History ==
Sakai is within ancient Hizen Province.

The city of Saikai was established on April 1, 2005, from the merger of five towns on the northern tip of Nishisonogi Peninsula: the former town of Saikai, Ōseto, Ōshima, Sakito and Seihi (all from Nishisonogi District). Its city hall is the former town hall of Ōseto.

== Geography ==
Saikai is located on the northern tip of the Nishisonogi Peninsula, surrounded on three sides by the Goto Sea, Sasebo Bay, and Ōmura Bay, and islands scattered around the area. Most of the area has a ria coastline, with a complex, indented coastline. The highest peak on the peninsula is Mount Nagaura, 561 meters above sea level (the summit is in Nagasaki City). The area down to the coast is hilly and includes evergreen broad-leaved forests, cedar and cypress forests, orchards, and farmland, with a narrow plain.

=== Neighbouring municipalities ===
Nagasaki Prefecture

- Nagasaki

=== Climate ===
Saikai has a humid subtropical climate (Köppen:Cfa) with hot summers and cool winters. The average annual temperature in Saikai is 16.6 °C (61.9 °F). The average annual rainfall is 1,710.7 mm (67.35 in) with June as the wettest month. The temperatures are highest on average in August, at around 26.7 °C (80.1 °F), and lowest in January, at around 7.4 °C (45.3 °F). Its record high is 36.7 °C (98.1 °F), reached on 21 August 2018, and its record low is −3.4 °C (25.9 °F), reached on 26 February 1981.

Climate data for Oseto, Saikai (1991−2020 normals, extremes 1977−present)
Month	Jan	Feb	Mar	Apr	May	Jun	Jul	Aug	Sep	Oct	Nov	Dec	Year
Record high °C (°F)	20.7 (69.3)	21.9 (71.4)	23.7 (74.7)	27.0 (80.6)	29.3 (84.7)	34.2 (93.6)	36.5 (97.7)	36.7 (98.1)	36.2 (97.2)	30.8 (87.4)	25.7 (78.3)	22.5 (72.5)	36.7 (98.1)
Mean daily maximum °C (°F)	10.4 (50.7)	11.6 (52.9)	14.8 (58.6)	19.0 (66.2)	22.3 (72.1)	24.9 (76.8)	28.5 (83.3)	30.2 (86.4)	27.5 (81.5)	23.0 (73.4)	17.8 (64.0)	12.8 (55.0)	20.2 (68.4)
Daily mean °C (°F)	7.4 (45.3)	8.0 (46.4)	10.8 (51.4)	14.8 (58.6)	18.4 (65.1)	21.6 (70.9)	25.4 (77.7)	26.7 (80.1)	23.6 (74.5)	19.1 (66.4)	14.3 (57.7)	9.5 (49.1)	16.6 (61.9)
Mean daily minimum °C (°F)	4.6 (40.3)	4.8 (40.6)	7.2 (45.0)	11.1 (52.0)	15.0 (59.0)	19.0 (66.2)	23.3 (73.9)	24.1 (75.4)	20.8 (69.4)	16.0 (60.8)	11.2 (52.2)	6.5 (43.7)	13.6 (56.5)
Record low °C (°F)	−2.7 (27.1)	−3.4 (25.9)	−2.9 (26.8)	3.2 (37.8)	8.1 (46.6)	12.1 (53.8)	15.6 (60.1)	18.6 (65.5)	12.8 (55.0)	6.6 (43.9)	2.9 (37.2)	−1.1 (30.0)	−3.4 (25.9)
Average precipitation mm (inches)	63.3 (2.49)	72.9 (2.87)	114.3 (4.50)	142.7 (5.62)	152.6 (6.01)	268.3 (10.56)	262.0 (10.31)	197.4 (7.77)	178.5 (7.03)	98.1 (3.86)	100.8 (3.97)	78.6 (3.09)	1,710.7 (67.35)
Average precipitation days (≥ 1.0 mm)	9.1	8.6	10.5	9.4	9.2	13.1	10.7	9.6	9.4	5.8	8.4	8.5	112.3
Mean monthly sunshine hours	104.2	131.1	176.6	199.1	207.9	140.1	178.3	231.0	198.5	202.2	150.6	116.1	2,039.2
Source: Japan Meteorological Agency

== Demographics ==
Per Japanese census data, the population of Saikai in 2020 is 26,275 people. Saikai has been conducting censuses since 1920. The city's population peaked in the 1950s with more than 80,000 people. However, since 1960, Saikai's population has fallen sharply, and in the 1970s it was half what it was 10 years before; by 2020, the population will be only a third of what it was in the 1950s.

Historical population

Year	Pop.	±%
1920	63,605	—
1925	61,263	−3.7%
1930	63,802	+4.1%
1935	57,938	−9.2%
1940	61,639	+6.4%
1945	73,144	+18.7%
1950	80,999	+10.7%
1955	84,161	+3.9%
1960	80,784	−4.0%
1965	60,591	−25.0%
1970	42,769	−29.4%

Year	Pop.	±%
1975	41,941	−1.9%
1980	41,064	−2.1%
1985	39,670	−3.4%
1990	37,610	−5.2%
1995	36,327	−3.4%
2000	35,288	−2.9%
2005	33,680	−4.6%
2010	31,183	−7.4%
2015	28,691	−8.0%
2020	26,275	−8.4%

Saikai population statistics

== Government ==
Saikai has a mayor-council form of government with a directly elected mayor and a unicameral city council of 18 members. Saikai contributes one member to the Nagasaki Prefectural Assembly. In terms of national politics, the city is part of the Nagasaki 3rd district of the lower house of the Diet of Japan. The city was previously part of Nagasaki 4th district, which was abolished in 2022.

== Economy ==
The economy of the towns in this area were dominated by fishing and whaling in the Edo period, and coal mining in the Meiji period. The area is now primarily agricultural, with forestry products and tourism also of importance. However, on Oshima island, north of Saikai and close to Sasebo, a large shipyard is active building bulk ships and metal structures, i.e. Oshima Shipbuilding, in which the Sumitomo Heavy Industries has shares.

== Education ==
Saikai has 11 public elementary schools and six public junior high schools by the city government, and three public high schools operated by the Nagasaki Prefectural Board of Education. The prefecture also operates one special education school for the handicapped.

== Transportation ==
=== Railways ===
The city does not have any passenger railway service. The nearest train station is Sasebo Station, with which it is connected by bus.

=== Highways ===
- National Route 202
- National Route 206

== Sister cities ==
- Bowen, Queensland. Australia
