= Kitatakaki District, Nagasaki =

Former district in Nagasaki prefecture, Japan

Kitatakaki (北高来郡, Kitatakaki-gun) was a district located in Nagasaki Prefecture, Japan.

As of 2003, the district had an estimated population of 31,482 and a density of 244.41 persons per km^{2}. The total area was 128.81 km^{2}.

== Towns and villages ==
- Iimori
- Konagai
- Moriyama
- Takaki

== Merger ==
On January 4, 2005, the towns of Iimori, Konagai, Moriyama and Takaki were merged into the expanded city of Isahaya. Kitatakaki District was dissolved as a result of this merger.
