= Iōjima, Nagasaki =

Dissolved municipality in Nagasaki prefecture, Japan

Iōjima 伊王島町
- Municipality
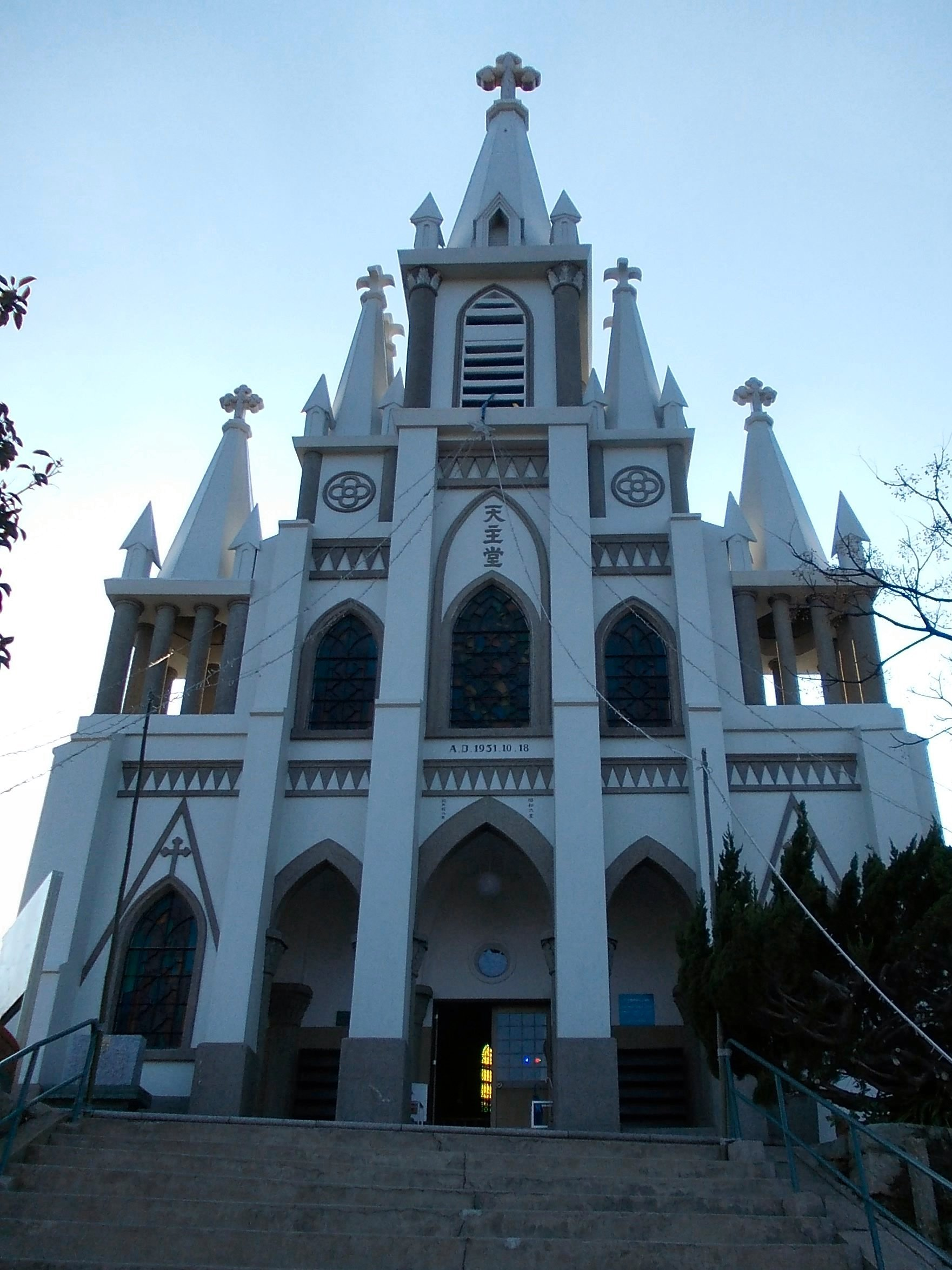
- Magome Catholic Church in Iōjima, a Tangible Cultural Property of Japan
- Interactive map of Iōjima
- Coordinates: 32°42′11″N 129°46′45″E
- Country: Japan
- Region: Kyushu
- Prefecture: Nagasaki Prefecture
- District: Nishisonogi
- Merged into Nagasaki: January 4, 2005

Area
  - Total: 2.26 km^{2} (0.87 sq mi)

Population (2003)
  - Total: 883
  - Density: 390.71/km^{2} (1,011.9/sq mi)
- Time zone: UTC+09:00 (JST)

Iōjima (伊王島町, Iōjima-chō) was a town located in Nishisonogi District, Nagasaki Prefecture, Japan. Iōjima was the only town on the island of Iōjima near Nagasaki City. The island includes beaches and an onsen.

As of 2003, the town had an estimated population of 883 and a density of 390.71 persons per km^{2}. The total area was 2.26 km^{2}.

On January 4, 2005, Iōjima, along with the towns of Kōyagi, Nomozaki, Sanwa, Sotome and Takashima (all from Nishisonogi District), was merged into the expanded city of Nagasaki and no longer exists as an independent municipality.

The onsen on the island is called Nagasaki Onsen Yasuragi Ioujima and offers natural springs and a fermented rice bran bath.

Technically an island, Iōjima is linked to mainland Kyūshū by a bridge.
