= Bernard Ryosuke Inagaki =

Japanese Catholic philosopher (1928–2022)

- 安倍 晋三
- Born: Inagaki Ryōsuke; 27 November 1928; Saga Prefecture, Japan
- Died: 15 January 2022 (aged 93)
- Other name: Ryōsuke Inagaki

Philosophical work
- Era: Middle Ages, Renaissance
- Region: Western philosophy
- School: Neo-scholasticism, Thomism
- Main interests: Metaphysics, natural philosophy, jurisprudence, philosophy of law, theology

Bernard Ryosuke Inagaki (Japanese: 稲垣良典; 27 November 1928 – 15 January 2022) was a Japanese philosopher and Thomas Aquinas scholar. He wrote extensively on medieval philosophy, scholastic philosophy, and philosophy of law. He is known for leading the Japanese translation of Aquinas' Summa Theologiæ.

== Biography ==
Inagaki graduated from the University of Tokyo in 1951 and finished his PhD in philosophy at the Catholic University of America in 1955. After teaching philosophy at Nanzan University, Kyushu University, and Fukuoka Jo Gakuin University, he became a professor of humanities at the Nagasaki Junshin Catholic University. He stated that his work had been greatly influenced by the study of Thomas Aquinas in French philosophers Étienne Gilson and Jacques Maritain. He died from stomach cancer on 15 January 2022, at the age of 93.

== Summa Theologiæ translation ==
The translation of the Summa Theologiæ earned Inagaki, and his team, the 2013 Mainichi Publishing Culture Award and the 2014 Tetsurō Watsuji Prize.

== Works ==
Books in Japanese

- (1961) Philosophy of Common Good in Thomas Aquinas: Persona and Society (トマス・アクィナスの共通善思想 人格と社会)
- (1970, 1990, 2000) An Investigation of Philosophy in Thomas Aquinas (トマス・アクィナス哲学の研究)
- (1971, 1977) Modern Catholic Thought (現代カトリシズムの思想)
- (1972) A Theory of Legal Justice (法的正義の理論)
- (1973) Philosophy of Peace (平和の哲学)
- (1979) Faith and Reason (信仰と理性)
- (1979) The Volume 20 of the Intellectual Heritage of the Humanity: Thomas Aquinas (人類の知的遺産. 20 トマス・アクィナス)
  - (1999) Reprinted as Thomas Aquinas (トマス・アクィナス)
- (1979, 1996, 2007) Thomas Aquinas (トマス・アクィナス ＜思想学説全書＞)
- (1981) Man in the Bible (聖書のなかの人間)
- (1981) Philosophy of Habit (習慣の哲学)
- (1988) The Time for Grace (恵みの時)
- (1990) Abstraction and Intuition: A Study of Epistemology in later Middle Ages (抽象と直観 中世後期認識理論の研究)
- (1992) Thomas Aquinas (トマス=アクィナス ＜新書・人と思想＞)
- (1996) An Introduction to the Theory of Angels (天使論序説)
- (1997) A Study of Ethics in Thomas Aquinas (トマス・アクィナス倫理学の研究)
- (2000) A Study of Theological Language (神学的言語の研究)
- (2002) God As A Problem: Experience, Existence and God (問題としての神 経験・存在・神)
- (2003) A Theory of the Foundation of the Human Culture (人間文化基礎論)
- (2008) Lectures on Empiricism and Experience (講義・経験主義と経験)
- (2009) Thomas Aquinas: Summa Theologiæ (トマス・アクィナス「神学大全」)
- (2009) Philosophy of Persona (人格《ペルソナ》の哲学)

Articles & Book Chapters in English

- (1963) "Thomism in Japan" in Proceedings of the American Catholic Philosophical Association, 37:224-227.
- (1969) "Scholastic Studies in Japan" in The New Scholasticism, 43 (2):294-300.
- (1987) "Habitus and Nature in Acquinas" in Studies in philosophy and the history of philosophy. v.17.
- (1997) "Rinrigaku" in The Review of Metaphysics, 51 (2):459-460.

Translations (to Japanese)

- Thomas Aquinas, (1977–2012) Summa Theologiea (神学大全): 45 Volumes in Total.; (1958) On Law (法について); and (2012) Being and Essence (A Bilingual Edition) (在るものと本質について ラテン語対訳版)
- Frederick Copleston, (1968) Thomas Aquinas (トマス・アクィナス) ソフィア双書10：未來社、1962年/上智大学出版部、
- Robert Edward Brennan, (1962) General Psychology: A Study of Man Based on St. Thomas Aquinas (人間の研究 トマス的心理学入門)
- Fernand Van Steenberghen, (1990) An Introduction to Philosophy of Thomas Aquinas
- Joseph Reiners (1983) The Problem of the Universals in early Middle Ages
- Pierre Riché, (1994) A Short Biography of St. Bernard
- Karl Rahner, (1975) Man, Future and Theology (人間の未来と神学)
- Alexis Carrel, (1984) The Voyage to Lourdes (ルルドへの旅)
- Joseph Pieper, (1962) What Is Called For Philosophizing? (哲学するとはどういうことか); (1974) On Love (愛について); and (1988) Leisure, the Basis of Culture (余暇と祝祭)
- Mortimer Jerome Adler, (1997) The Angels and Us (天使とわれら)
- Étienne Drioton, (1959) Religion of Ancient Orient (Les religions de I'Orient ancien) (古代オリエントの宗教)
- Régis Jolivet, (1960) God of Philosopher and Savant (哲学者と知者の神)
- Lon L. Fuller, The Morality of Law (法と道徳)
- John M. Oesterreicher, (1969) Walls Are Crumbling : Seven Jewish Philosophers Discover Christ (崩れゆく壁 キリストを発見した7人のユダヤの哲学者)
- Jacques Maritain, (1962) Man and the State (人間と国家)
- Walter M. Abbott et al., (1973–1976) The Bible Reader
