= Nagasaki Junshin Junior College =

Coordinates: 32°47′55″N 129°54′37″E

Nagasaki Junshin Junior College (長崎純心大学短期大学部, Nagasaki Junshin Daigaku Tanki Daigaku) was a private junior college in Nagasaki, Japan. Established in 1950 as Junshin Women's Junior College, it was renamed Nagasaki Junshin Junior College in 2000. The junior college was closed in 2006.

== See also ==
- Nagasaki Junshin Catholic University
