= Ishii Fudeko =

Japanese pioneer for women's education

- Born: Watanabe Fude; 27 April 1861
- Died: 24 January 1944 (aged 82)
- Occupations: Educator, writer

Ishii Fudeko (born Watanabe Fude, 27 April 1861 (Bunkyu-1) – 24 January 1944 (Showa-19)) was a pioneer of modern education for Japanese girls, and one of the first founders of welfare for people with mental disabilities in Japan.

== Early life ==
Born as the eldest daughter of Watanabe Kiyoshi and Gen, her father was a feudal retainer of the Hizen Ōmura clan, a patriot through the end of the Tokugawa period to the Meiji Restoration, and the Meiji government appointed him a baron for his service as the Fukuoka prefecture Ordinance and a Councilor of the Genroin Senate. Fudeko's uncle, Watanabe Noboru, was also a meritorious man with a friendship with patriot Sakamoto Ryōma at the turn of the Meiji Restoration contributing to the Satsuma Alliance. Watanabe Tei was her younger half brother and he became the third school principal of Takinogawa Gakuen.

== Study abroad ==
After graduating from Tokyo Jogakko, a national girls' school, Fudeko studied in Europe per the order of Empress Kōmyō, and returned to Japan to become a teacher at Kazoku Jogakko (literary Girls' School for the Nobles, present Gakushuin) and taught French to daughters of imperial and aristocrat families, together with Tsuda Umeko who also studied abroad with her. Among her students, there was Empress Teimei. Fudeko was also a popular figure and frequented the balls at the Rokumeikan, being reputed as "the flower of the Rokumeikan". Taking office as a principal of Seishu Girls' School, Fudeko was a leader in modern education for girl students. The School was succeeded to Tsuda Umeko's Joshi Eigakujuku (literary Girls' School for English Studies), the present Tsuda College.

Her husband was Ogashima Minoru (1857–1892), a high-ranking official also from her village. They had three daughters; the two elder daughters were born with intellectual disabilities, and the youngest died at birth. She was widowed when her husband died at the age of 35 in 1892. Fudeko was baptized around that period.

== School for disabled children ==
She had her daughters to Takinogawa Gakuen school under the care of principal Ishii Ryoichi, and she did not spare economic and spiritual support to the school. Fudeko understood Ryoichi 's mission in life as well as his personality to marry him, and she started to contribute for the protection, education and independence of mentally handicapped persons. Under Militia, an individual with intellectual disability was regarded as a burden to the society being not capable for manufacturing or as a labor. Sympathy or understanding for those was extremely low, and those disabled lived locked up in rooms more than frequently. While Fudeko actually taught at her classes, she succeeded in receiving economic support to Takinogawa Gakuen through her contact with her alumni at Tokyo Jogakko and her students as members of the royal family, wives of aristocrats and successful business people; they contributed to her school to keep running and expanded at a modest schale. In her later years, she was half-paralyzed after suffering stroke, lost her husband who left her a huge debt and their school. While she once considered to closing their school, but decided to keep her husband 's will, and on October 16, 1937 at the age of 76 years, Fudeko took office as the second school principal. However, it was the wartime when she lost lives of her students as well as faculty members, Ishii Fudeko died at the age of 83 uncertain of her school's future. The Takinogawa school had survived the war and continued on to be the current Takinogawa Gakuen, incorporated as a social welfare institute.

== Bibliography ==
=== Her books ===
- 火影 (Hokage) [A flicker of light] (in Japanese). 藤本鐡助. 1920.
- Ishii Fudeko (1924). Shizenkai to otogibanashi [Fables and the nature] (in Japanese). Tōkyō: Tōkyōdō Shoten. OCLC 672949990.
- Fudeko Ishii; Teruyo Iwami (2007). Suginishi hi no ryokō nikki: Meiji sanjūichinen Beikoku ni tsukaiseshi ori no tenmatsu; Kane no hibiki; Moshiogusa [Memoir: Those days I visited the United States of America in Meiji 31]. Kindai Nihon no sekushuariti: Josei no kakarekata ni miru sekushuariti (in Japanese). Vol. 9. Yumani Shobō. ISBN 9784843321959. OCLC 124046542.

=== Further reading ===
Books

- Shakai jigyō no ikita joseitachi: sono shōgai to shigoto (in Japanese). Domesu shuppan. 1983.
- Kawao Toyoshi (2000). Ishii Fudeko (in Japanese). Fuchū, Tokyo: St. Mark's Church, The Holy Catholic Church in Japan.
- Akira Masugi (2000). Tenshi no piano: Ishii Fudeko no shōgai (in Japanese). Netto Musashino. ISBN 9784944237029. OCLC 674579228.
- Yūji Tsumagari (2001). Ishii Fudeko. Shirīzu Fukushi ni ikiru (in Japanese). Vol. 49. Ōzorasha. ISBN 9784283000797. OCLC 49896690.
- Yasuko Ichibangase; Yūji Tsumagari; Toyoshi Kawao, eds. (2004). "Kindai" o toi rekishi ni umoreta josei no shōgai : mumyō no hito Ishii Fudeko (Book, 2004) [WorldCat.org]. Domesu Shuppan. ISBN 9784810706185. OCLC 56824496.
- Otabe Yuji (2007). Kazokuke no josei-tachi [Ladies of noble families] (in Japanese). Shogakukan. ISBN 9784093877107. OCLC 150413172.
- Rekishi Kyōikusha Kyōgikai, ed. (2010). "Geijutsu gakumon kyōiku no sekai o kirihiraite". Rekishi O Ikita Joseitachi (in Japanese). 2. Chōbunsha. ISBN 9784811385518. OCLC 703341257.
- magoroku ide (2013). Ibaramichi o shirite sasageshi: ishii fudeko no futatsu no jinsei (in Japanese). Iwanami Shoten. ISBN 9784000259286. OCLC 867599834.
- Yōichi Nagashima (2014). Meiji no kokusaijin Ishii Fudeko: Denmāku josei Yohanne Myuntā to no kōryū [Ishii Fudeko, a Meiji cosmopolitan: Her friendship with Johanne Munster, a Dane] (in Japanese). Shinhyōron. ISBN 9784794809803. OCLC 891549392.
- Yūji Tsumagari (2016). "Ishii Fudeko"-dokuhon: hato ga tobitatsu hi: danjo kyōdō sankaku to tokubetsu shien kyōiku, fukushi no haha (in Japanese). Satoru Yonekawa (contributor). Ōzorasha. ISBN 9784283013254.

Periodicals

- Yūji Tsumagari (1992). "Ishii Fudeko sensei no gaikoku keiken ni tsuite" [Principal Fudeko Ishii and her visit to foreign countries]. 淳化 (in Japanese) (7). 滝乃川学園学園史研究会.
- Yūji Tsumagari (March 1999). "Ishii Fudeko no yoshoki ni kansuru kenkyu nooto" [A research notebook on Ishii Fudeko's younger years]. Kochi Joshi Daigaku Kiyo (in Japanese). 48. Kochi Joshi Daigaku: 1–14. ISSN 1344-8277. OCLC 5172519942.
- Yūji Tsumagari (March 2000). "Ishii Fudeko to 1898 (Meiji 31) Bankoku Fujin Kurabu Taikai". Kochi Joshi Daigaku Kiyo (in Japanese). 49. Kochi Joshi Daigaku: 1–8. ISSN 1344-8277. OCLC 5172519954.
- Yūji Tsumagari (March 2001). "Ishii Fudeko no 1898 (Meiji 31) hobei no kenkyu : Sikago kara nuyoku he" [Ishii Fudeko and visiting the USA in 1898: From Chicago to New York]. Kochi Joshi Daigaku Kiyo (in Japanese). 50. Kochi Joshi Daigaku: 47–54. ISSN 1344-8277.
- Ōmura-shi Ishii Fudeko Kenshō Jigyō Jikkō Iinkai (2002). "Ishii Fudeko no shōgai: kindai o hiraita josei: ibaraji o shirite sasageshi". Ōmura Shisei Shikō Rokujisshūnen Kinen Jigyō: Ishii Fudeko (in Japanese). Ōmura, Nagasaki, Ōmura-shi Ishii Fudeko Kenshō Jigyō Jikkō Iinkai.
- Yūji Tsumagari (2005). "Ishiifudeko kenkyu dainihon fujin kyoikukai zasshi to no kakawari" [Studies on Ishii Fudeko: Dainihon fujin kyoiku zasshi]. Junshin Jinbun Kenkyu (in Japanese) (11). Nagasaki Junshin Catholic University: 25–31. ISSN 1341-2027.
- La Beauty, ed. (2007). Ishii Fudeko (hirointachi no kioku): "Chiisaki mono" ni ai wo sasageta chiteki shogaisha kyouiku no senkusha. La Beauty (in Japanese). Olvis.
- Yūji Tsumagari (2007-03-01). "Takinogawa-gakuen "Ishii kinen bunko" no keisei to sono rekisiteki igi: oubun zosho no bunseki wo tosite" [The Study of the Ishii Ryoichi Memorial Library in the Takinogawa Gakuen Institution for the Intellectually Handicapped: The Process of Its Formation and Its Historical Value]. Ningen Bunka Kenkyu (in Japanese). 5. Nagasaki Junshin Catholic University: 1–7. doi:10.4189/shes.5.1_1.
- Yoneda Hiroki (May 2007). "Eiga-hyo "Mumyo no hito: Ishii Fudeko no shogai" to jakkan no kosatsu: Fukushi-shi kenkyu no kongo". Tokyo Shakai Fukushi-shi Kenkyu (in Japanese) (1): 129–131. ISSN 1881-9869. OCLC 5172119632.
- Shiratsuchi Yasuyo (2008). "Ishii fudeko kenkyu eme marutan haha no kyoiku no sho ni tsuite" [A study on Fudeko Ishii concerning educaobn of Mothers of Families by Aime Martin]. Nihon Bunri Daigaku Kiyo (in Japanese). 36 (1): 67–75. ISSN 0287-3036. OCLC 5174355107.
- Sachiko Oishi (April 2011). Kyosai Kumiai Rengo (ed.). "Watashi no mite-aruki Rokumeikan no meika Ishii Fudeko no shogai: Shogaiji kyoiku no senkusha". Kyousai Sinpo (in Japanese). 52 (4): 31–33. ISSN 1342-5234. OCLC 5174583045.
- Tokunaga Sachiko (March 2013). "Iwanaga Maki to Ishii Fudeko no fukushi jissen no jidai haikei" [The Historical Background of Practice of Social Work for Children by Iwanaga Maki and Isii Fudeko]. Kwassui Periodicals (in Japanese). 56. Kwassui Women's University: 109–126. ISSN 1880-7720. OCLC 5185953386.
- Tsumagari Yuji (2013). "Amerika - eruin chiteki shogaisha senta to nihonjin: Tanaka Fujimaro, Nitobe Inazō, Uchimura Kanzō, Konishi Nobuhachi, Ishii Fudeko, Ishii Ryoichi" [Elwyn Center for People with Intellectually Disabilities in the U.S.A. and the Japanese: F. Tanaka, I. Nitobe, K. Uchimura, N. Konishi, F. & R. Ishii]. Junshin Jinbun Kenkyu (in Japanese) (19). Nagasaki Junshin Catholic University: 165–181. ISSN 1341-2027. OCLC 5183082035.
- Yūji Tsumagari (2016). "Tsumagari Yūji kyoju saishukogi Ishii Fudeko no mittsu no sekai (Nagasaki, nihon, sekai): "Shisetushi" kenkyu kara mietekita mono (Special issue: the retiring Professor Yūji Tsumagari)" [The world of Fudeko Ishii (Nagasaki, japan, the world): The view of historical research on Social Welfare Facilities]. Junshin Journal of Human Services (in Japanese) (20). Nagasaki Junshin Catholic University: 1–13. ISSN 1342-1506.

Film and others

- Miyasaki Nobue (director), Sadahito Yamazaki (producer), Koyama Shigeru (narrator), Yoshinaga Sayuri (reader), Mariko Sakai (actor) (2006). Mumyo no hito: Ishii Fudeko (DVD). Peace Create Inc.
- Tokiwa Takako, Gendai purodakushon (production) (2007). Fujiko sono ai: Tenshi no piano (theater).
- Gaimusho kiroku "Amerika-koku fujin kurabu rengou taikai kaisetu ni tsuki Tsuda Umeko hoka ichimei sanretu ikkentuki eikoku he ousho no ken". 1880 (Meiji 13), 1898 (Meiji 31)
