= Nagasaki =

Core city in Kyushu, Japan

Nagasaki 長崎市
- Prefecture capital and core city
- Nagasaki City
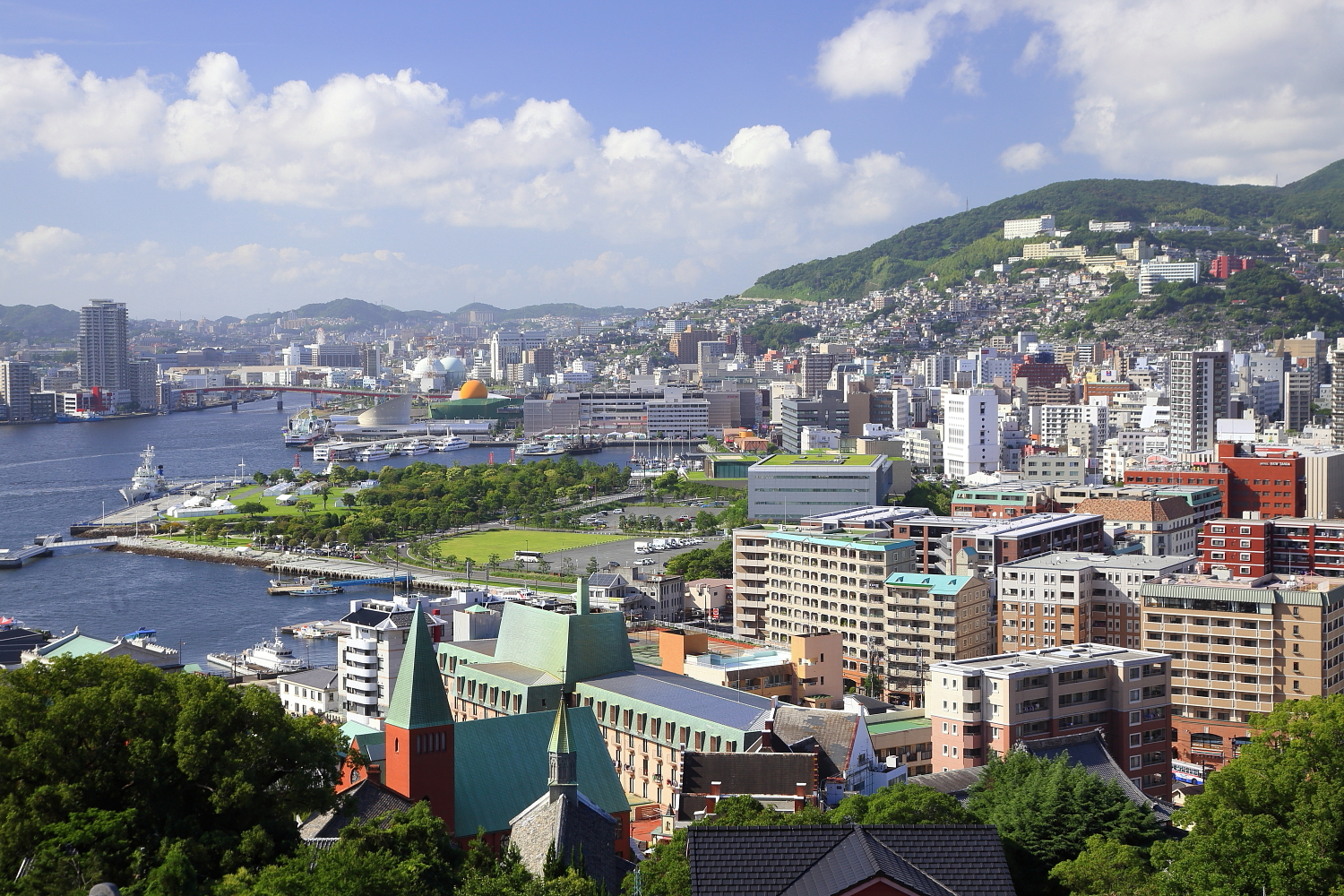
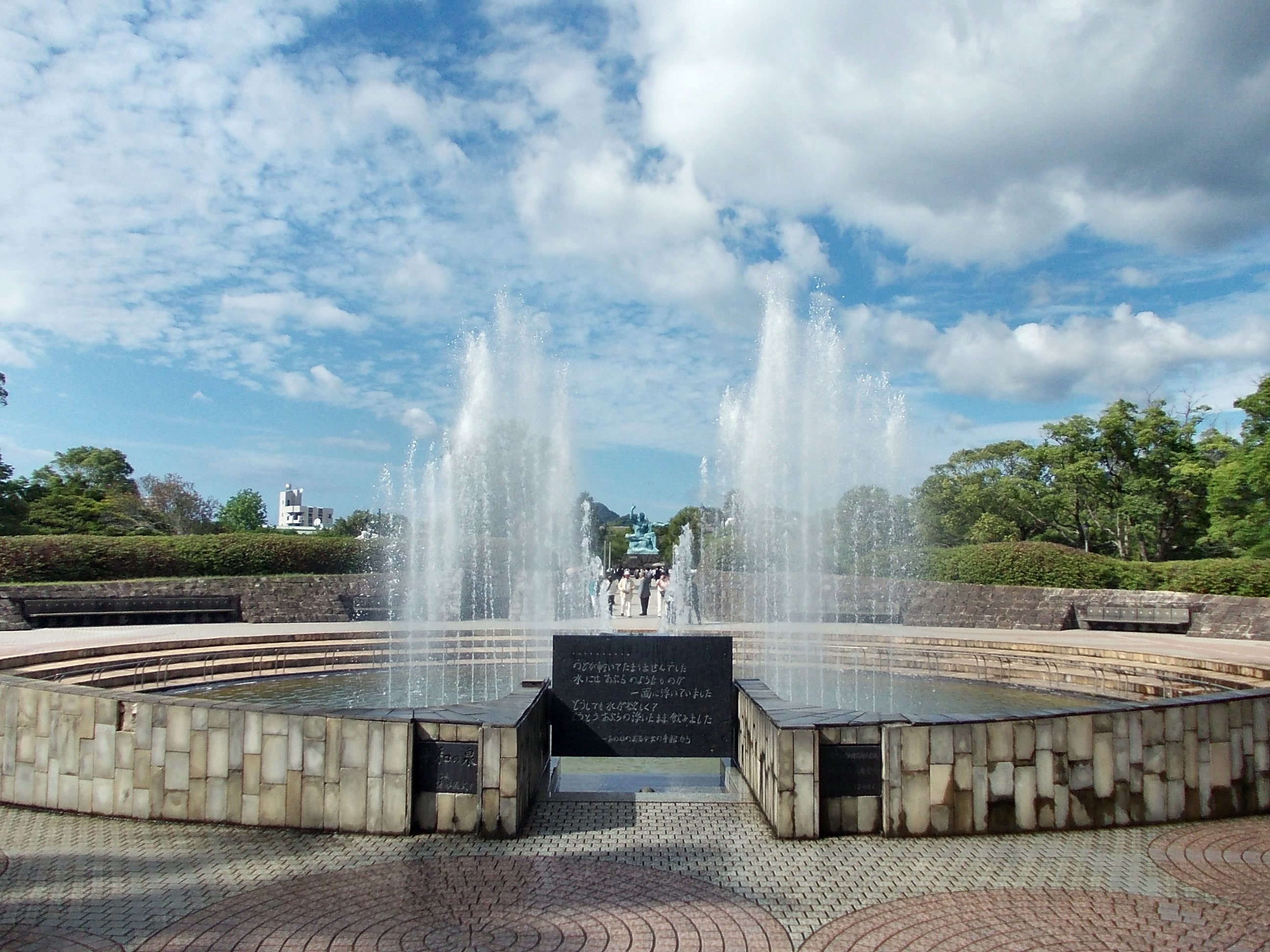
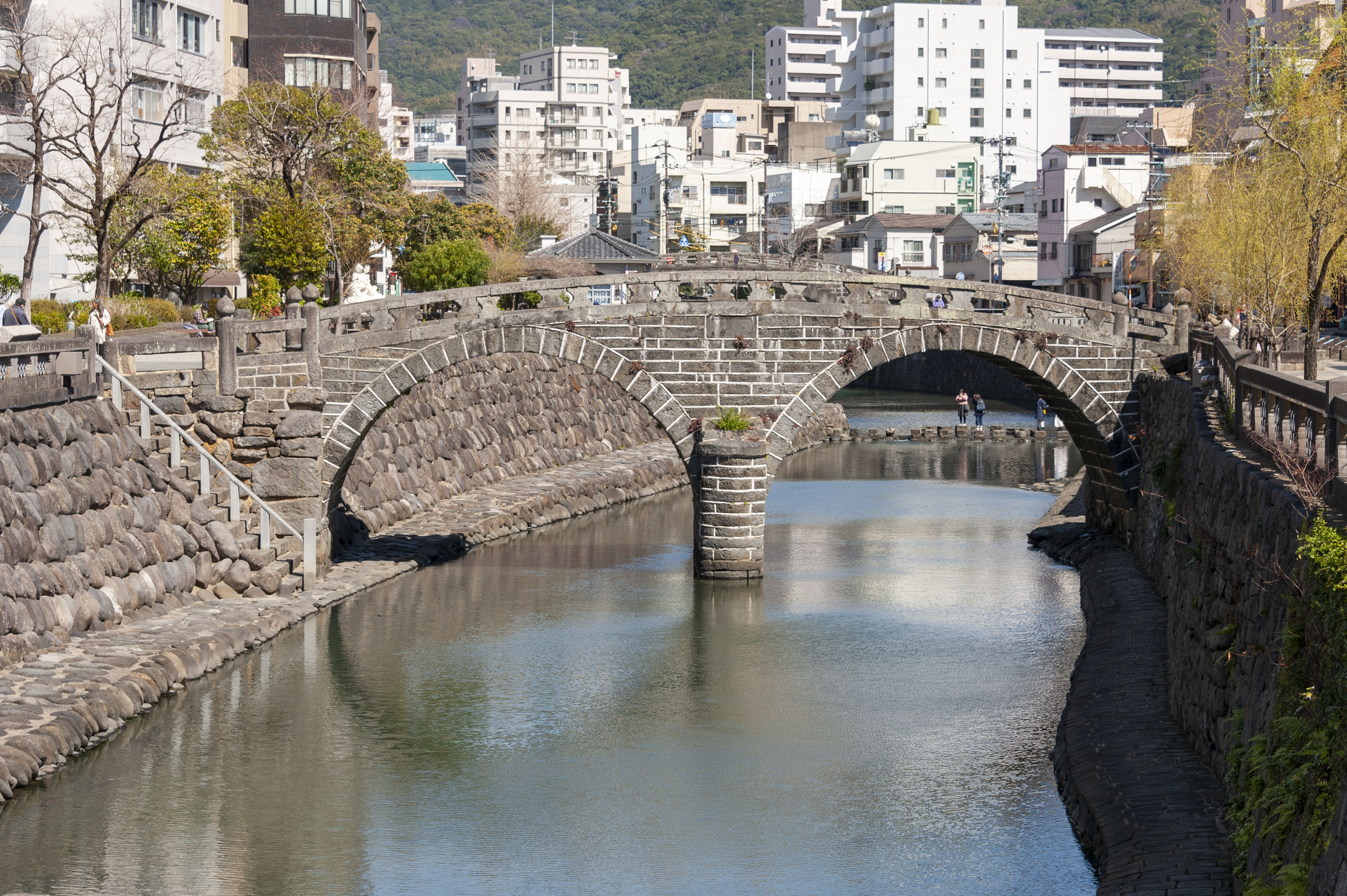
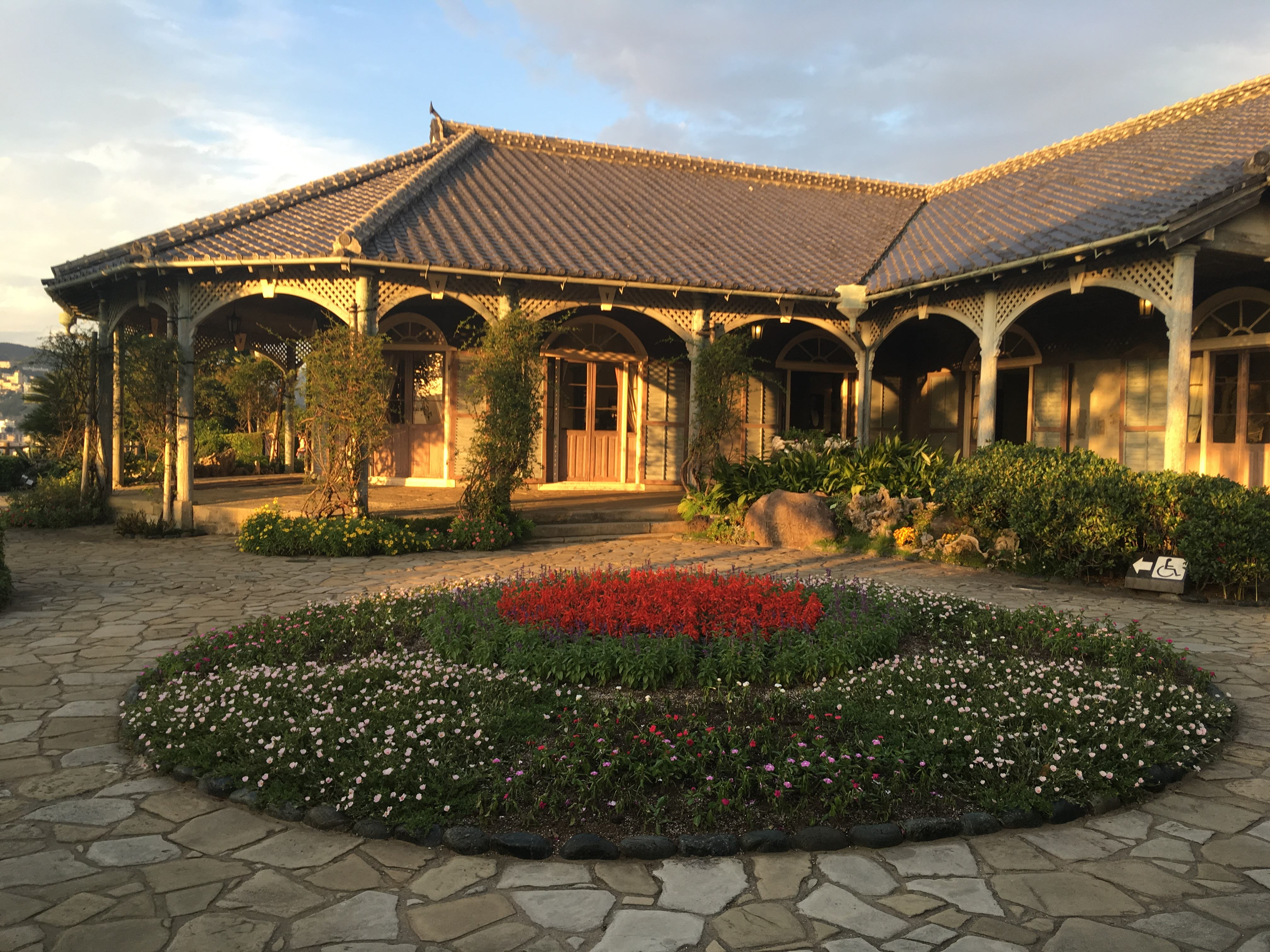
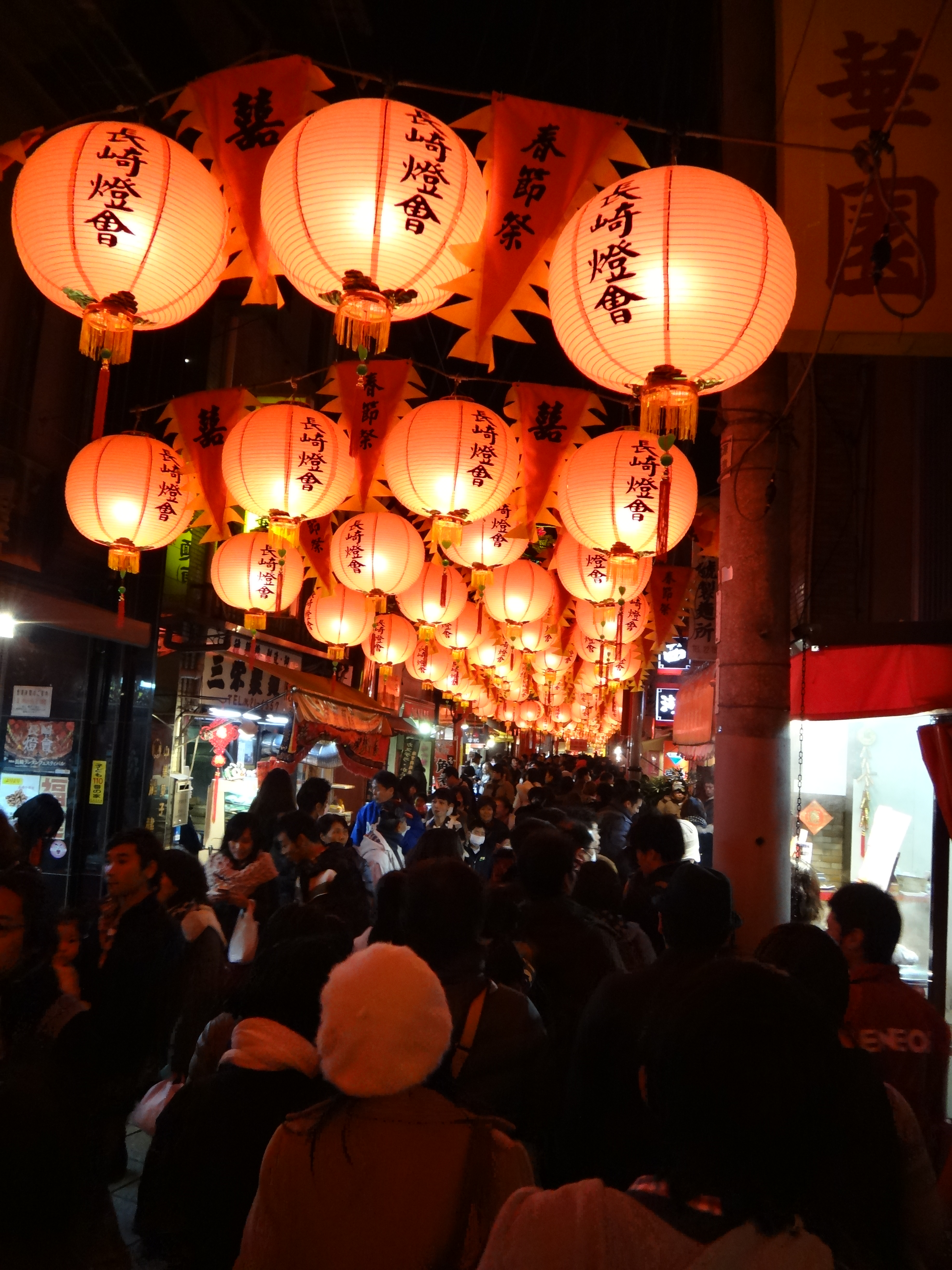
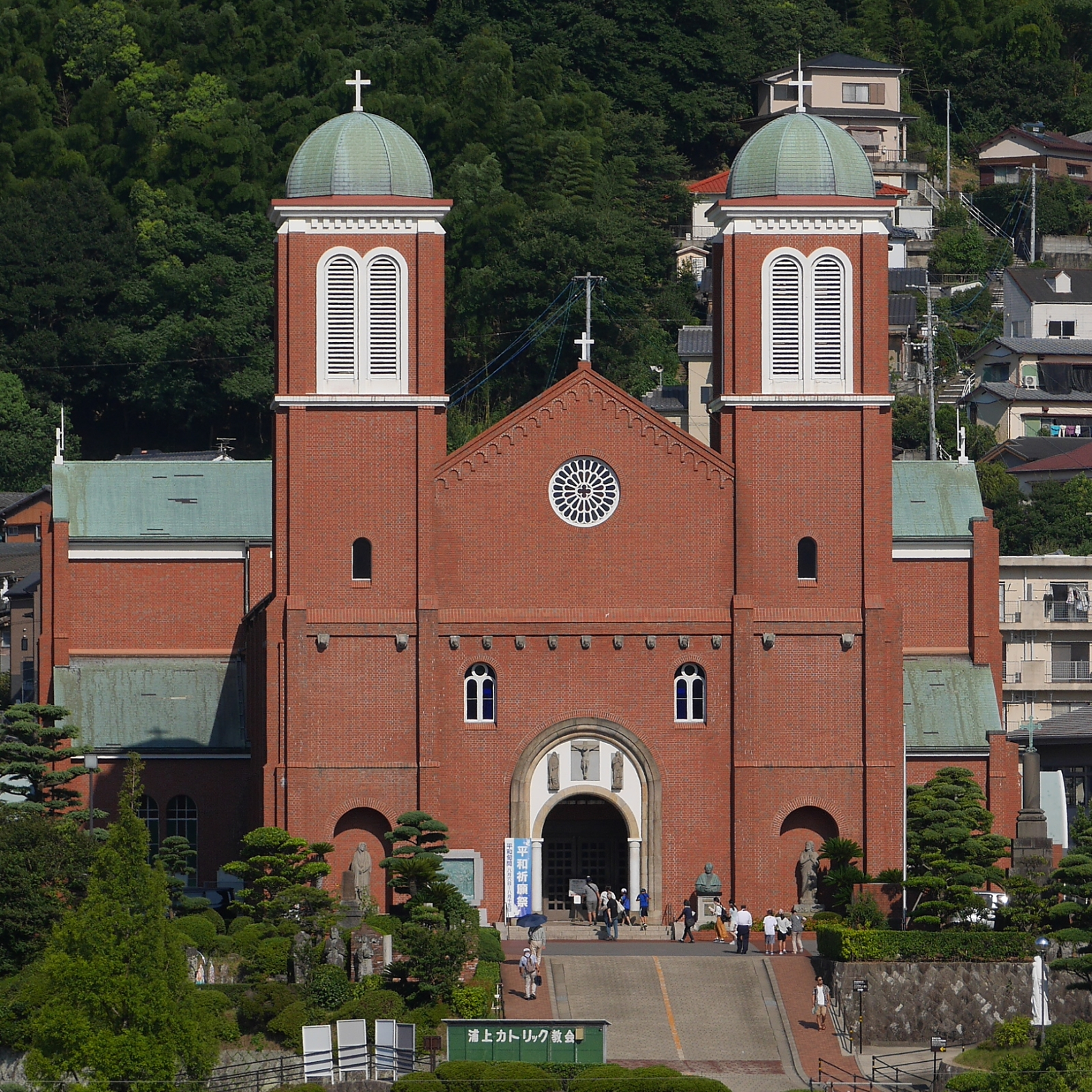
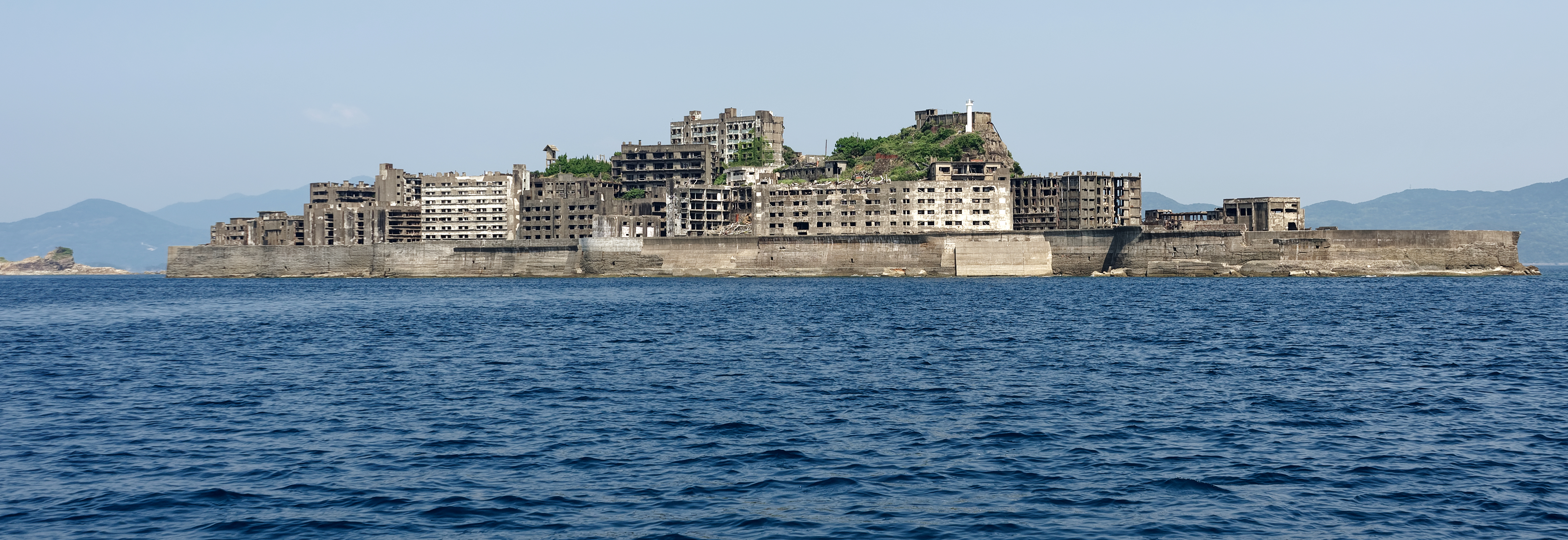
- Nagasaki City View from Glover Garden Nagasaki Peace Park Megane Bridge Glover Garden Oura Church Nagasaki Lantern Festival Urakami Cathedral Hashima Island (Gunkan Island)

- Flag Seal
- Nicknames: City of Peace; Naples of the Orient
- Map of Nagasaki Prefecture with Nagasaki highlighted in dark pink

- Nagasaki (Japan) Nagasaki (Asia) Nagasaki (Earth)
- Coordinates: 32°44′41″N 129°52′25″E
- Country: Japan
- Region: Kyushu
- Prefecture: Nagasaki Prefecture
- Harbor opened for foreign trade: 1571
- Became treaty port: 1859
- Incorporated as a city: April 1, 1889

Government
  - Mayor: Shirō Suzuki (indp.)

Area
  - Total: 405.86 km^{2} (156.70 sq mi)
  - Land: 240.71 km^{2} (92.94 sq mi)
  - Water: 165.15 km^{2} (63.76 sq mi)

Population (February 1, 2024)
  - Total: 392,281
  - Density: 1,629.7/km^{2} (4,220.9/sq mi)
- Time zone: UTC+9 (Japan Standard Time)
  - Tree: Chinese tallow tree
  - Flower: Hydrangea
- Phone number: 095-825-5151
- Address: 2–22 Sakura-machi, Nagasaki-shi, Nagasaki-ken; 850-8685
- Website: www.city.nagasaki.lg.jp

Nagasaki
- Nagasaki in kanji

Japanese name
- Kanji: 長崎
- Hiragana: ながさき
Transcriptions
- Romanization: Nagasaki

Nagasaki (長崎, Nagasaki; English: /ˌnæɡ.ə.ˈsɑːk.i, ˌnɑːɡ-, -ˈsæk-/; Japanese: [nä̀.ɡä́.sä̀.k̟ʲì, -ŋä́-] lit. 'Long Cape'), officially Nagasaki City (長崎市, Nagasaki-shi; [nä̀.ɡä́.sä́.k̟ʲi̥.ɕì, -ŋä́-]), is the capital and the largest city of Nagasaki Prefecture on the island of Kyushu in Japan.

Founded by the Portuguese, the port of Nagasaki became the sole port used for trade with the Portuguese and Dutch during the 16th through 19th centuries. The Hidden Christian Sites in the Nagasaki Region have been recognized and included in the UNESCO World Heritage Sites list. Part of Nagasaki was home to a major Imperial Japanese Navy base during the First Sino-Japanese War and Russo-Japanese War. Near the end of World War II, the American atomic bombings of Hiroshima and Nagasaki made Nagasaki the second city in the world to experience a nuclear attack. The city was later rebuilt.

As of February 1, 2024, Nagasaki has an estimated population of 392,281, and a population density of 966 people per km^{2}. The total area is 405.86 km^{2} (156.70 sq mi).

== History ==
=== Nagasaki as a Jesuit port of call ===
The first recorded contact between Portuguese explorers and Japan occurred in 1543, when a Portuguese ship, possibly a Chinese junk carrying Portuguese sailors, was blown off course and landed on Tanegashima, an island south of Kyūshū. This event marked the beginning of direct contact between Japan and Europe. The Portuguese introduced goods and ideas, including European firearms and Christianity, which influenced Japanese society.

Soon after, Portuguese ships started sailing to Japan as regular trade freighters, thus increasing the contact and trade relations between Japan and the rest of the world, and particularly with mainland China, with whom Japan had previously severed its commercial and political ties, mainly due to a number of incidents involving wokou piracy in the South China Sea, with the Portuguese now serving as intermediaries between the two East Asian neighbors.

Despite the mutual advantages derived from these trading contacts, which would soon be acknowledged by all parties involved, the lack of a proper seaport in Kyūshū for the purpose of harboring foreign ships posed a major problem for both merchants and the Kyushu daimyōs (feudal lords) who expected to collect great advantages from the trade with the Portuguese.

In the meantime, Spanish Jesuit missionary St. Francis Xavier arrived in Kagoshima, South Kyūshū, in 1549. After a somewhat fruitful two-year sojourn in Japan, he left for China in 1552 but died soon afterwards. His followers who remained behind converted a number of daimyōs. The most notable among them was Ōmura Sumitada. In 1569, Ōmura granted a permit for the establishment of a port with the purpose of harboring Portuguese ships in Nagasaki, which was set up in 1571, under the supervision of the Jesuit missionary Gaspar Vilela and Portuguese Captain-Major Tristão Vaz de Veiga, with Ōmura's personal assistance.

The little harbor village quickly grew into a diverse port city, and Portuguese products imported through Nagasaki (such as tobacco, bread, textiles and a Portuguese sponge-cake called castellas) were assimilated into popular Japanese culture. Tempura derived from a popular Portuguese recipe originally known as peixinhos da horta, and takes its name from the Portuguese word, 'tempero,' seasoning, and refers to the tempora quadragesima, forty days of Lent during which eating meat was forbidden, another example of the enduring effects of this cultural exchange. The Portuguese also brought with them many goods from other Asian countries, such as China. The value of Portuguese exports from Nagasaki during the 16th century were estimated to ascend to over 1,000,000 cruzados, reaching as many as 3,000,000 in 1637.

Due to the instability during the Sengoku period, Sumitada and Jesuit leader Alessandro Valignano conceived a plan to pass administrative control over to the Society of Jesus rather than see the Catholic city taken over by a non-Catholic daimyō. Thus, for a brief period after 1580, the city of Nagasaki was a Jesuit colony, under their administrative and military control. It became a refuge for Christians escaping maltreatment in other regions of Japan. In 1587, however, Toyotomi Hideyoshi's campaign to unify the country arrived in Kyūshū. Concerned with the large Christian influence in Kyūshū, Hideyoshi ordered the expulsion of all missionaries, and placed the city under his direct control. However, the expulsion order went largely unenforced, and the fact remained that most of Nagasaki's population remained openly practicing Catholic.

In 1596, the Spanish ship San Felipe was wrecked off the coast of Shikoku, and Hideyoshi learned from its pilot that the Spanish Franciscans were the vanguard of an Iberian invasion of Japan. In response, Hideyoshi ordered the crucifixions of twenty-six Catholics in Nagasaki on February 5 of the next year (i.e. the "Twenty-six Martyrs of Japan"). Portuguese traders were not ostracized, however, and so the city continued to thrive.

In 1602, Augustinian missionaries also arrived in Japan, and when Tokugawa Ieyasu took power in 1603, Catholicism was still tolerated. Many Catholic daimyōs had been critical allies at the Battle of Sekigahara, and the Tokugawa position was not strong enough to move against them. Once Osaka Castle had been taken and Toyotomi Hideyoshi's offspring killed, though, the Tokugawa dominance was assured. In addition, the Dutch and English presence allowed trade without religious strings attached. Thus, in 1614, Catholicism was officially banned and all missionaries ordered to leave. Most Catholic daimyo apostatized, and forced their subjects to do so, although a few would not renounce the religion and left the country for Macau, Luzon and Japantowns in Southeast Asia. A brutal campaign of persecution followed, with thousands of converts across Kyūshū and other parts of Japan killed, tortured, or forced to renounce their religion. Many Japanese and foreign Christians were executed by public crucifixion and burning at the stake in Nagasaki. They became known as the Martyrs of Japan and were later venerated by several Popes.

Catholicism's last gasp as an open religion and the last major military action in Japan until the Meiji Restoration was the Shimabara Rebellion of 1637. While there is no evidence that Europeans directly incited the rebellion, Shimabara Domain had been a Christian han for several decades, and the rebels adopted many Portuguese motifs and Christian icons. Consequently, in Tokugawa society the word "Shimabara" solidified the connection between Christianity and disloyalty. The Shimabara Rebellion also convinced many policy-makers that foreign influences were more trouble than they were worth, leading to the national isolation policy. The Portuguese were expelled from the archipelago altogether. They had previously been living on a specially constructed artificial island in Nagasaki harbour that served as a trading post, called Dejima. The Dutch were then moved from their base at Hirado onto the artificial island.

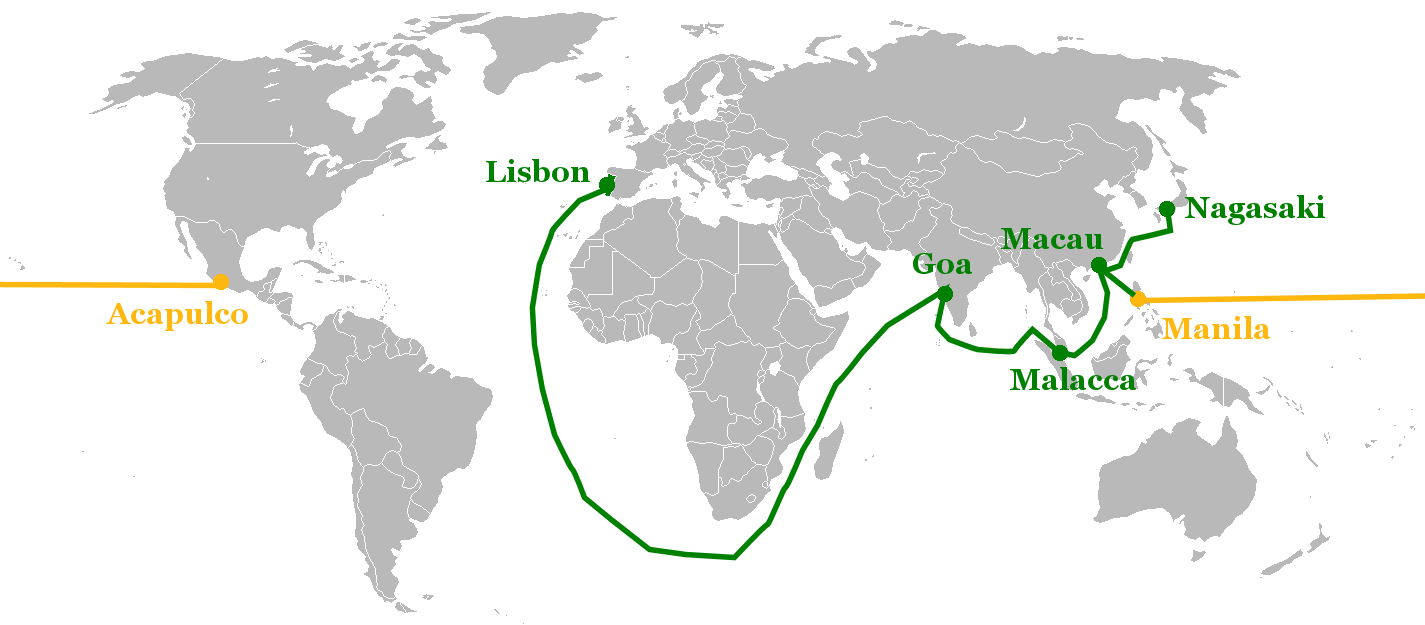
Portuguese (green) and Spanish (yellow) trade routes to Macao and Nagasaki

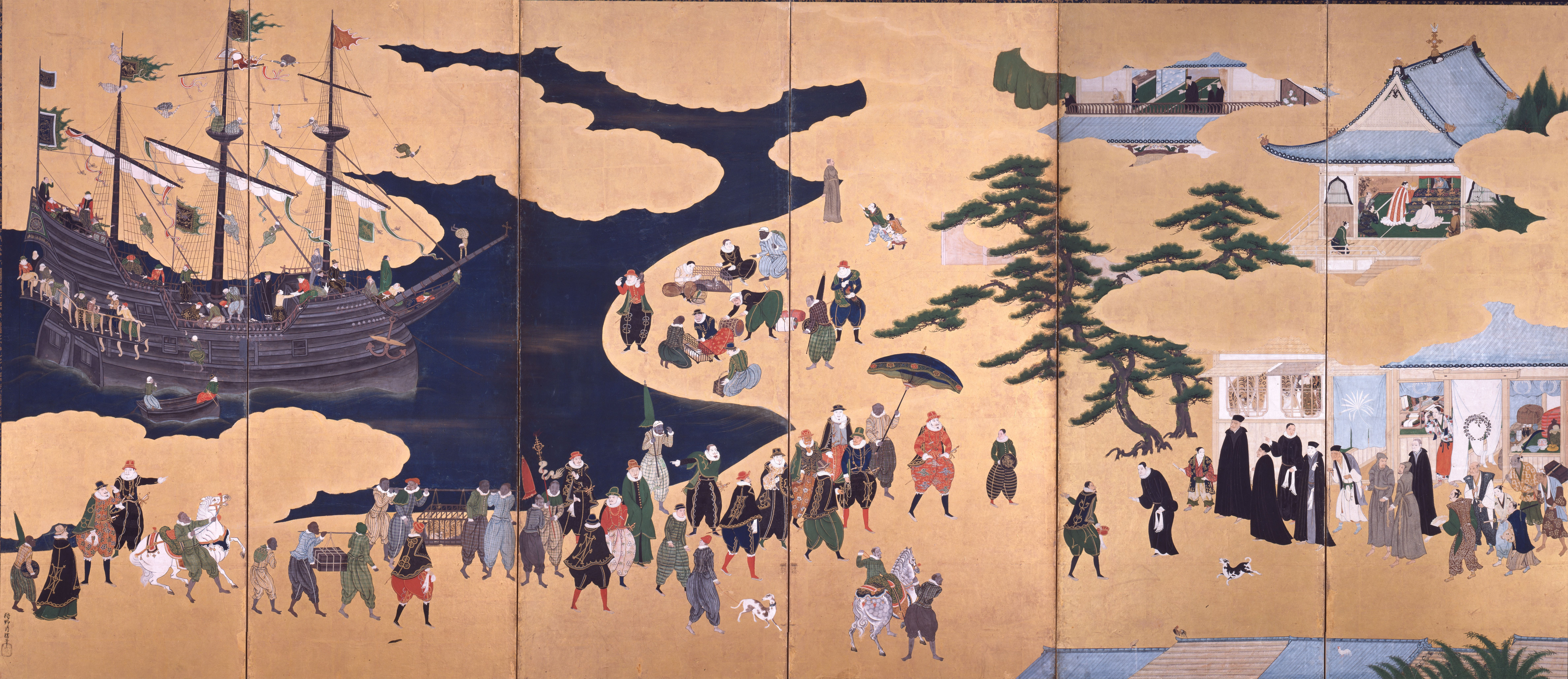
Nanban trade by Kanō Naizen, c. 1600. The screen shows Portuguese merchants docking in Japan.

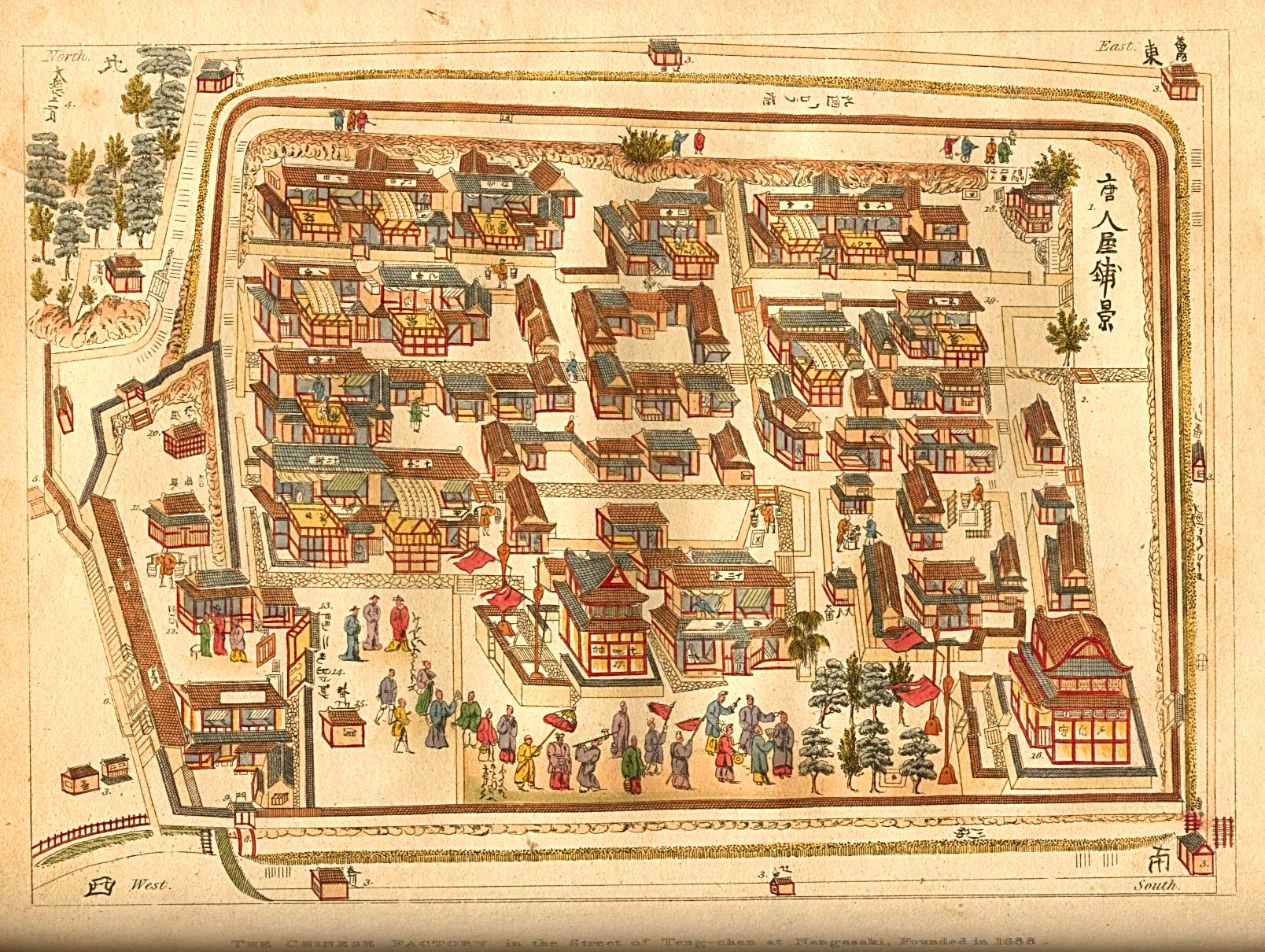
The Chinese traders at Nagasaki were confined to a walled compound (Tōjin yashiki), c. 1688

=== Seclusion era ===
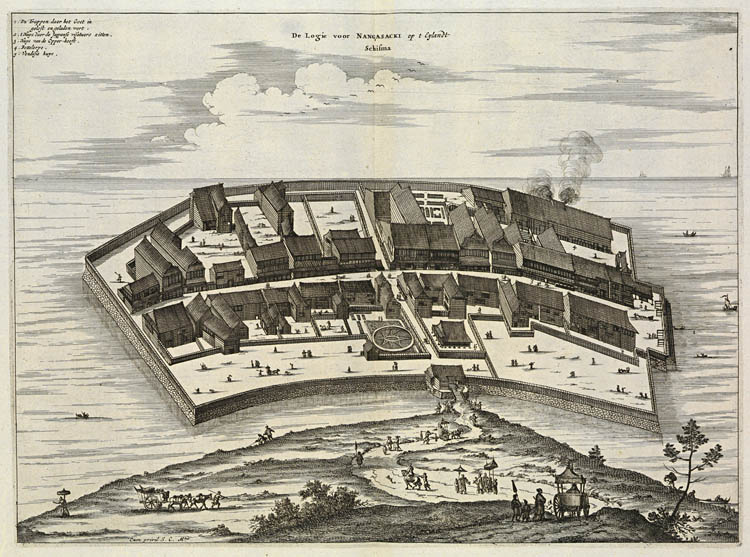
Dejima was an artificial island in Nagasaki Bay; its fan shape was easily recognizable. The trading post consisted mainly of warehouses and dwelling houses (1669 engraving).

The Great Fire of Nagasaki destroyed much of the city in 1663, including the Mazu shrine at the Kofuku Temple patronized by the Chinese sailors and merchants visiting the port.

In 1720, the ban on Dutch books was lifted, causing hundreds of scholars to flood into Nagasaki to study European science and art. Consequently, Nagasaki became a major center of what was called rangaku, or "Dutch learning". During the Edo period, the Tokugawa shogunate governed the city, appointing a hatamoto, the Nagasaki bugyō, as its chief administrator. During this period, Nagasaki was designated a "shogunal city". The number of such cities rose from three to eleven under the Tokugawa administration.

Consensus among historians was once that Nagasaki was Japan's only window on the world during its time as a closed country in the Tokugawa era. However, nowadays, it is generally accepted that this was not the case, since Japan interacted and traded with the Ryūkyū Kingdom, Korea and Russia through Satsuma, Tsushima and Matsumae respectively. Nevertheless, Nagasaki was depicted in contemporary art and literature as a cosmopolitan port brimming with exotic curiosities from the Western world.

In 1808, during the Napoleonic Wars, the Royal Navy frigate HMS Phaeton entered Nagasaki Harbor in search of Dutch trading ships. The local magistrate was unable to resist the crew's demand for food, fuel, and water, later committing seppuku as a result. Laws were passed in the wake of this incident strengthening coastal defenses, threatening death to intruding foreigners, and prompting the training of English and Russian translators.

The Tōjinyashiki (唐人屋敷) or Chinese Factory in Nagasaki was also an important conduit for Chinese goods and information for the Japanese market. Various Chinese merchants and artists sailed between the Chinese mainland and Nagasaki. Some actually combined the roles of merchant and artist such as 18th century Yi Hai. It is believed that as much as one-third of the population of Nagasaki at this time may have been Chinese. The Chinese traders at Nagasaki were confined to a walled compound (Tōjin yashiki) which was located in the same vicinity as Dejima island, and the activities of the Chinese, though less strictly controlled than the Dutch, were closely monitored by the Nagasaki bugyō.

=== Imperial Japan ===
With the Meiji Restoration, Japan opened its doors once again to foreign trade and diplomatic relations. Nagasaki became a treaty port in 1859 and modernization began in earnest in 1868. Nagasaki was officially proclaimed a city on April 1, 1889. With Christianity legalized and the Kakure Kirishitan coming out of hiding, Nagasaki regained its earlier role as a center for Roman Catholicism in Japan.

During the Meiji period, Nagasaki became a center of heavy industry. Its main industry was ship-building, with the dockyards under control of Mitsubishi Heavy Industries becoming one of the prime contractors for the Imperial Japanese Navy, and with Nagasaki harbor used as an anchorage under the control of nearby Sasebo Naval District. During World War II, at the time of the nuclear attack, Nagasaki was an important industrial city, containing both plants of the Mitsubishi Steel and Arms Works, the Akunoura Engine Works, Mitsubishi Arms Plant, Mitsubishi Electric Shipyards, Mitsubishi Steel and Arms Works, Mitsubishi-Urakami Ordnance Works, several other small factories, and most of the ports storage and trans-shipment facilities, which employed about 90% of the city's labor force, and accounted for 90% of the city's industry. These connections with the Japanese war effort made Nagasaki a major target for strategic bombing by the Allies during the war.

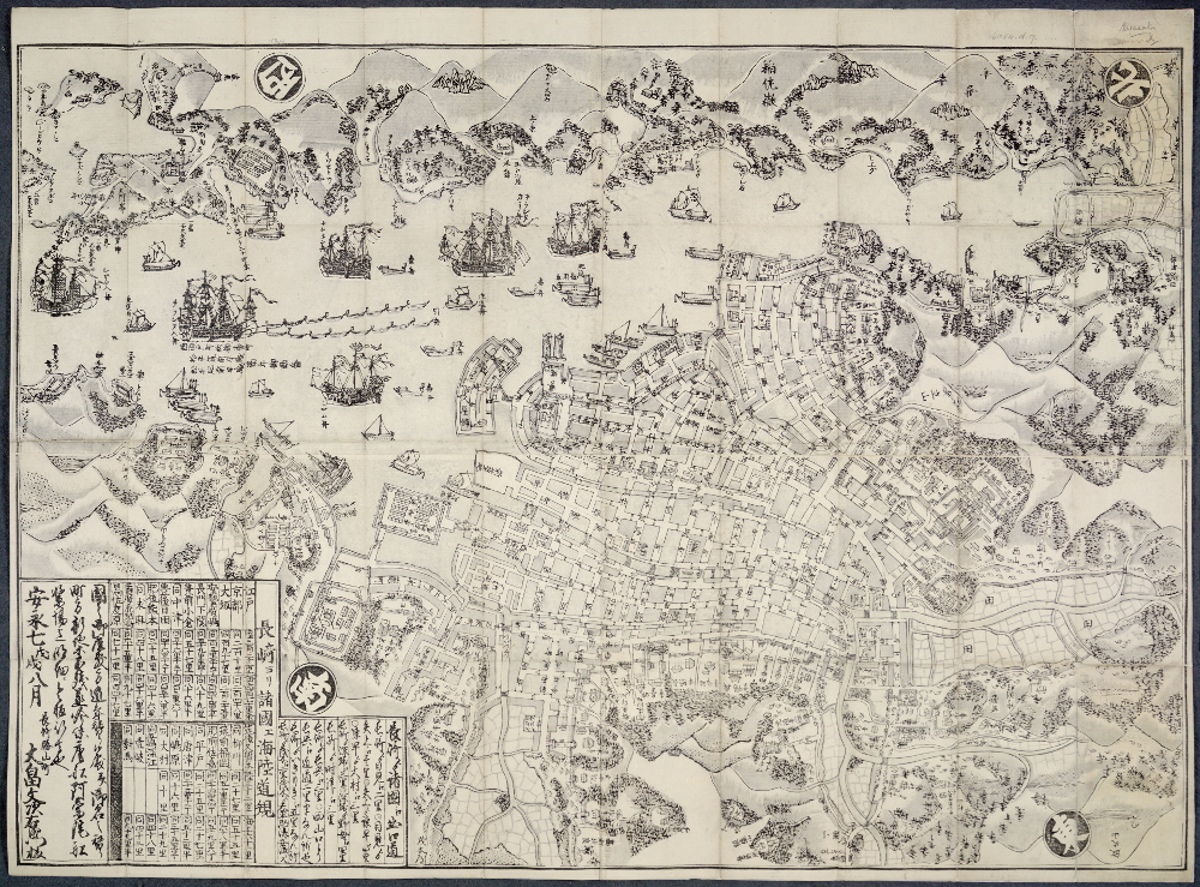
Plan of Nagasaki, Hizen province, 1778

View of Dejima in Nagasaki Bay by Kawahara Keigo c. 1836

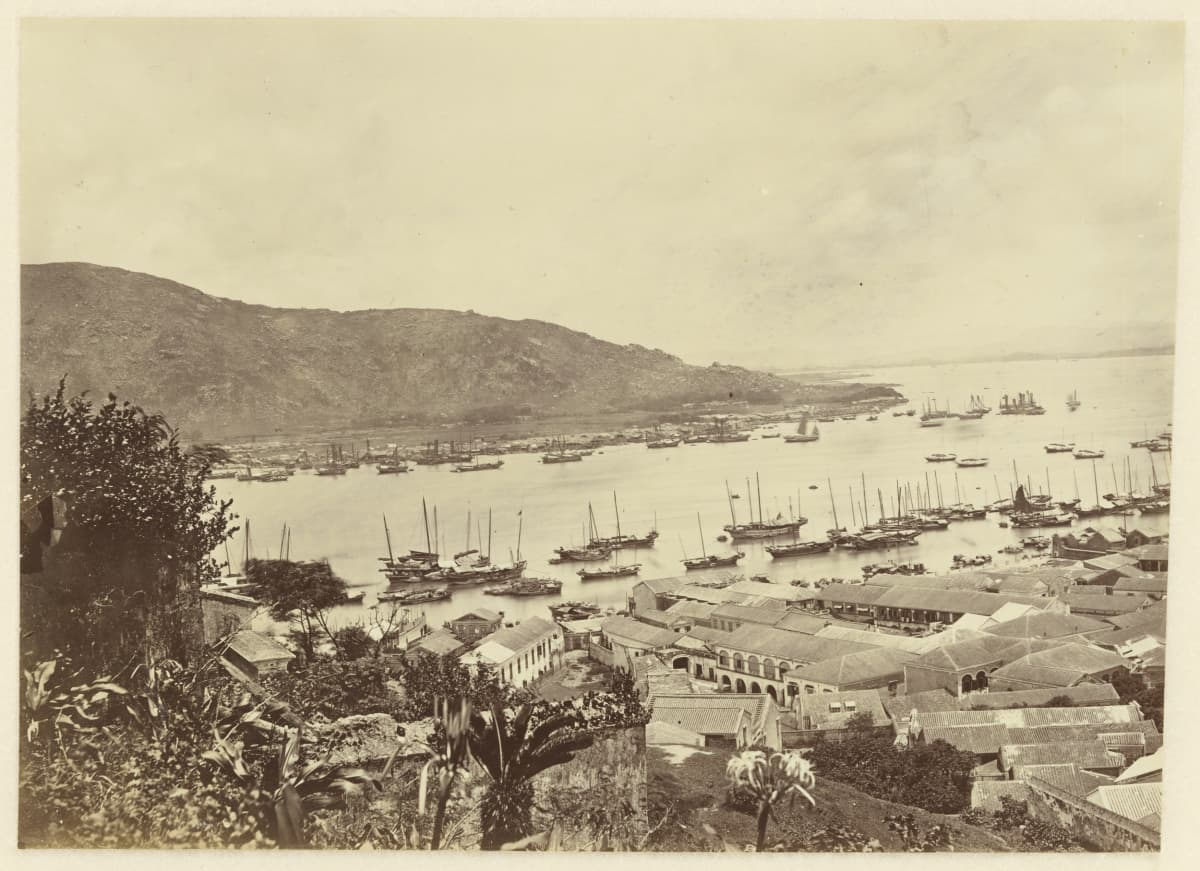
View of Nagasaki Bay, c. 1865

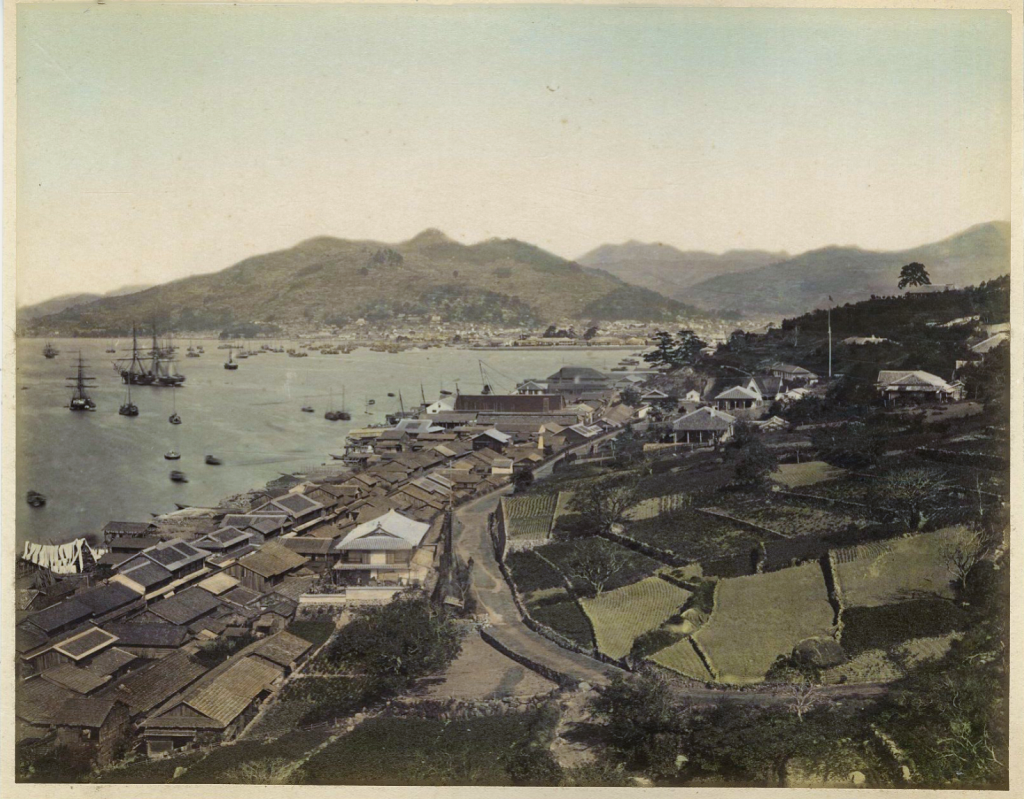
View of Nagasaki in 1870s

=== Atomic bombing during World War II ===
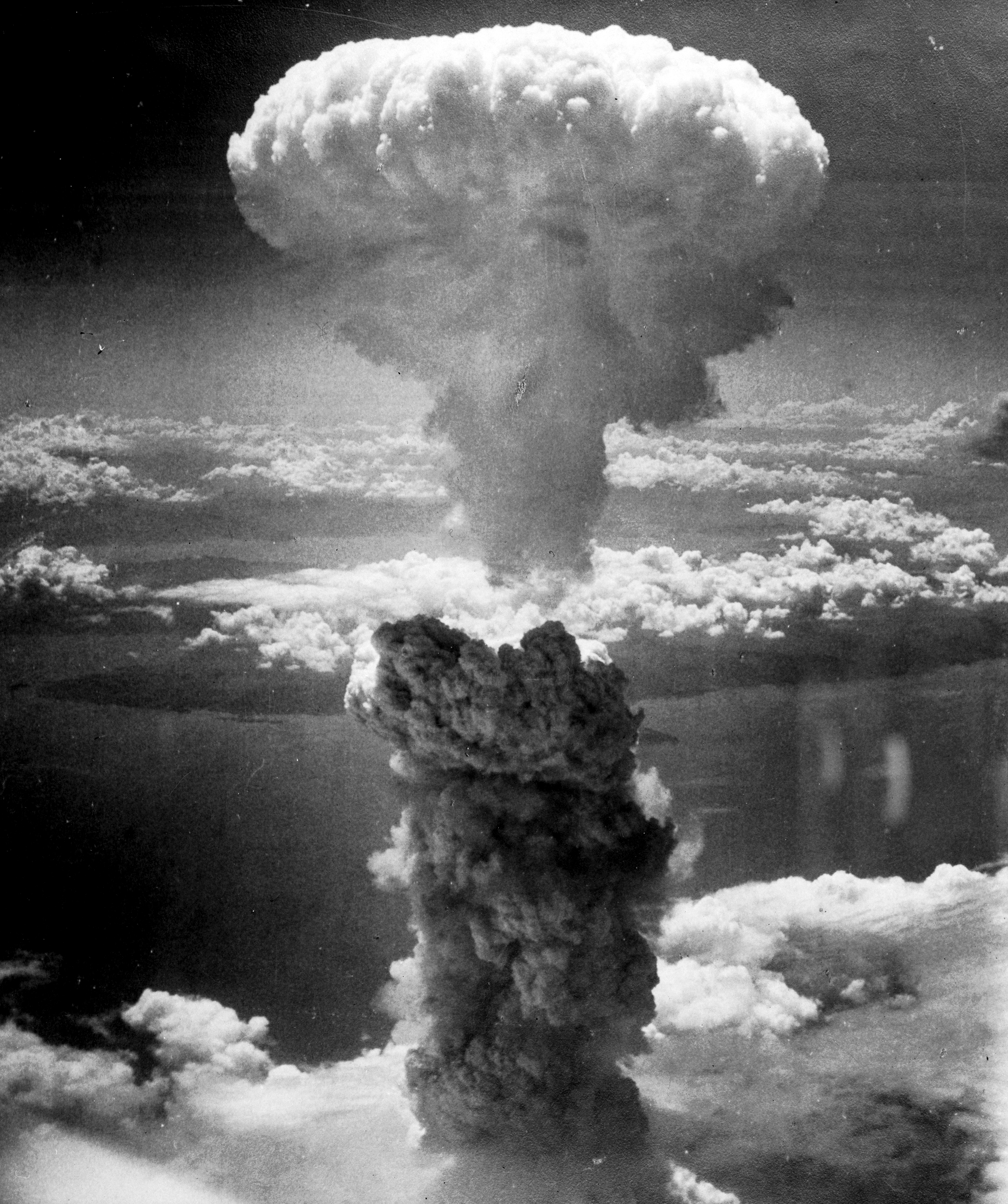
The mushroom cloud from the atomic explosion over Nagasaki at 11:02 am, August 9, 1945

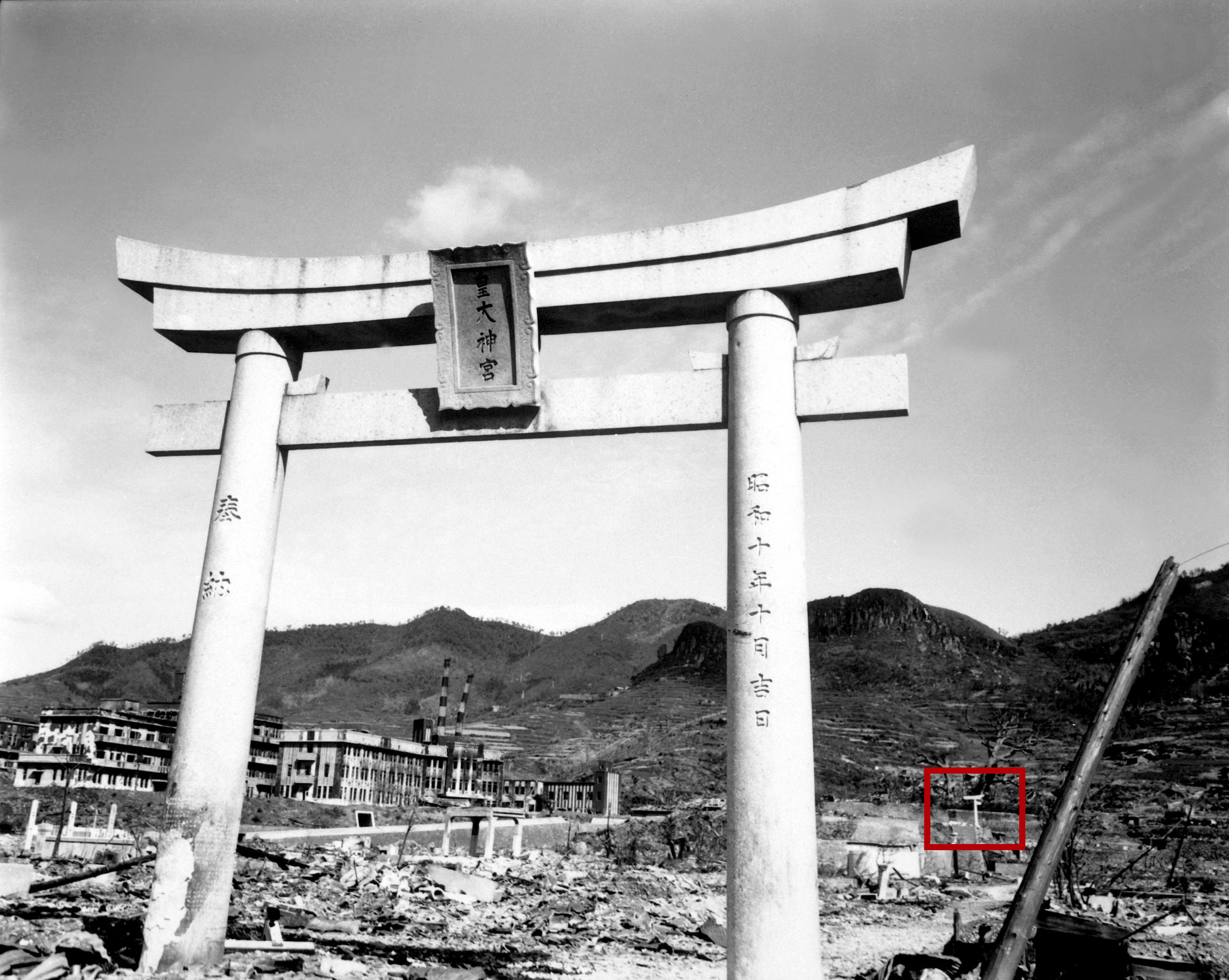
An intact torii in the foreground and a one-legged torii in the background, Nagasaki, October 1945

In the 12 months prior to the nuclear attack, Nagasaki had experienced five small-scale air attacks by an aggregate of 136 U.S. planes which dropped a total of 270 tons of high explosives, 53 tons of incendiaries, and 20 tons of fragmentation bombs. Of these, a raid of August 1, 1945, was the most effective, with a few of the bombs hitting the shipyards and dock areas in the southwest portion of the city, several hitting the Mitsubishi Steel and Arms Works, and six bombs landing at the Nagasaki Medical School and Hospital, with three direct hits on buildings there. While the damage from these few bombs was relatively small, it created considerable concern in Nagasaki and a number of people, principally school children, were evacuated to rural areas for safety, consequently reducing the population in the city at the time of the atomic attack.

On the day of the nuclear strike (August 9, 1945) the population in Nagasaki was estimated to be 263,000, which consisted of 240,000 Japanese residents, 10,000 Korean residents, 2,500 conscripted Korean workers, 9,000 Japanese soldiers, 600 conscripted Chinese workers, and 400 Allied POWs. That day, the Boeing B-29 Superfortress Bockscar, commanded by Major Charles Sweeney, departed from Tinian's North Field just before dawn, this time carrying a plutonium bomb, code named "Fat Man". The primary target for the bomb was Kokura, with the secondary target being Nagasaki, if the primary target was too cloudy to make a visual sighting. When the plane reached Kokura at 9:44 a.m. (10:44 am. Tinian Time), the city was obscured by clouds and smoke, as the nearby city of Yahata had been firebombed on the previous day – the steel plant in Yahata had also instructed their workforce to intentionally set fire to containers of coal tar, to produce target-obscuring black smoke. Unable to make a bombing attack 'on visual' because of the clouds and smoke, and with limited fuel, the plane left the city at 10:30 a.m. for the secondary target. After 20 minutes, the plane arrived at 10:50 a.m. over Nagasaki, but the city was also concealed by clouds. Desperately short of fuel and after making a couple of bombing runs without obtaining any visual target, the crew was forced to use radar to drop the bomb. At the last minute, the opening of the clouds allowed them to make visual contact with a racetrack in Nagasaki, and they dropped the bomb on the city's Urakami Valley, midway between the Mitsubishi Steel and Arms Works in the south, and the Mitsubishi-Urakami Ordnance Works in the north. The bomb exploded 47 seconds after its release, at 11:02 a.m. at an approximate altitude of 1,800 feet.

Less than a second after the detonation, the north of the city was destroyed and more than 10% of the city's population were killed. Among the 35,000 deaths were 150 Japanese soldiers, 6,200 out of the 7,500 employees of the Mitsubishi Munitions plant, and 24,000 others (including 2,000 Koreans). The industrial damage in Nagasaki was high, leaving 68‍–‍80% of the non-dock industrial production destroyed. It was the second and, to date, the last use of a nuclear weapon in combat, and also the second detonation of a plutonium bomb. The first combat use of a nuclear weapon was the "Little Boy" bomb, which was dropped on the Japanese city of Hiroshima on August 6, 1945. The first plutonium bomb was tested in central New Mexico, United States, on July 16, 1945. The Fat Man bomb was more powerful than the one dropped over Hiroshima, but because of Nagasaki's more uneven terrain, there was less damage.

=== Contemporary era ===
The city was rebuilt after the war, albeit dramatically changed. The pace of reconstruction was slow. The first simple emergency dwellings were not provided until 1946. The focus of redevelopment was the replacement of war industries with foreign trade, shipbuilding and fishing. This was formally declared when the Nagasaki International Culture City Reconstruction Law was passed in May 1949. New temples were built, as well as new churches, owing to an increase in the presence of Christianity. Some of the rubble was left as a memorial, such as a one-legged torii at Sannō Shrine and an arch near ground zero. New structures were also raised as memorials, such as the Atomic Bomb Museum. Nagasaki remains primarily a port city, supporting a rich shipbuilding industry.

On January 4, 2005, the towns of Iōjima, Kōyagi, Nomozaki, Sanwa, Sotome and Takashima (all from Nishisonogi District) were officially merged into Nagasaki along with the town of Kinkai the following year.

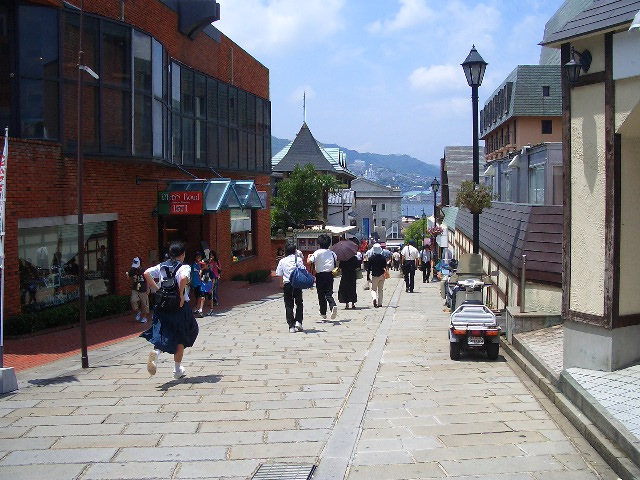
Modern Nagasaki, Oura Cathedral on a slope, 2005

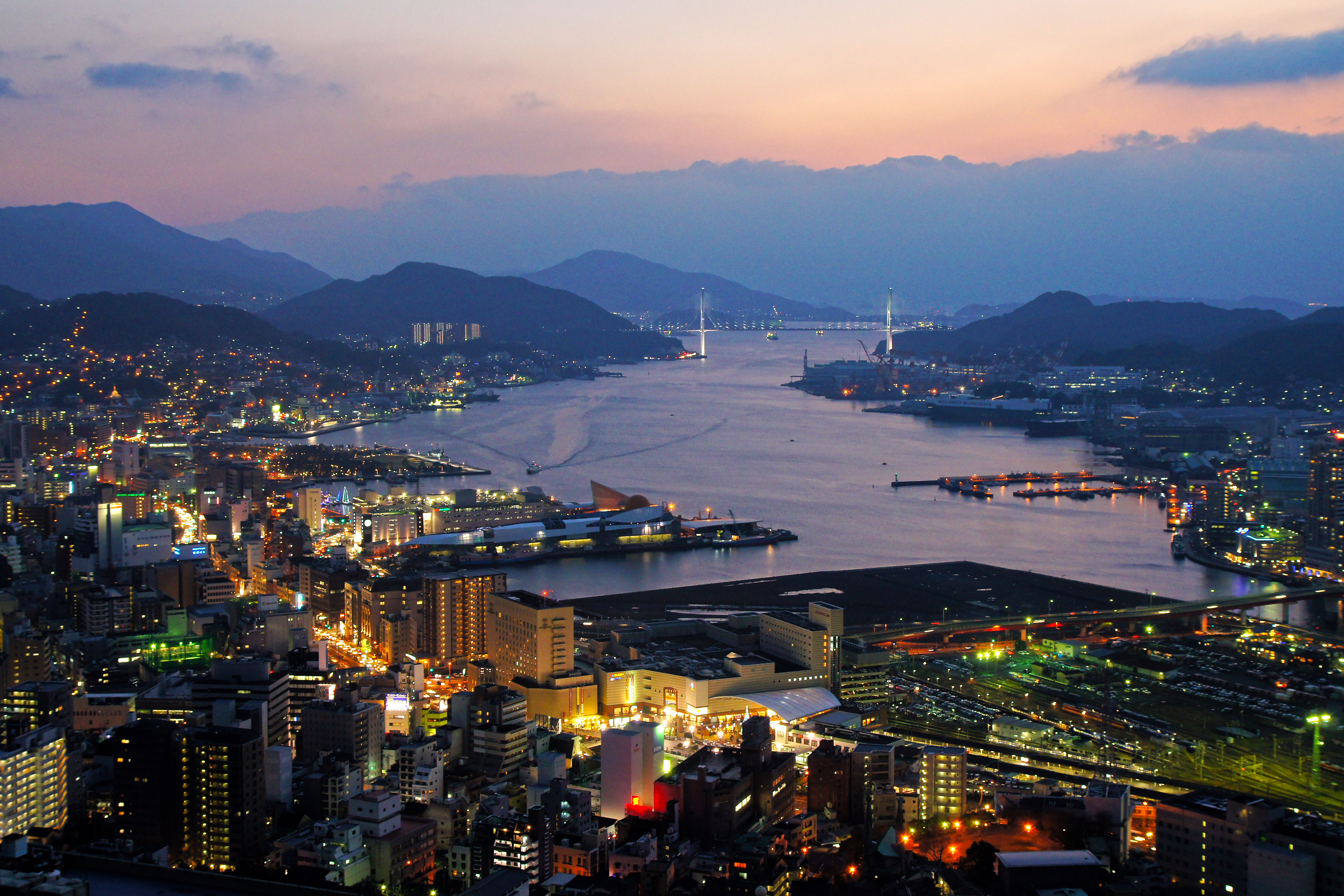
Night view of Nagasaki seen from Mount Konpira, 2012

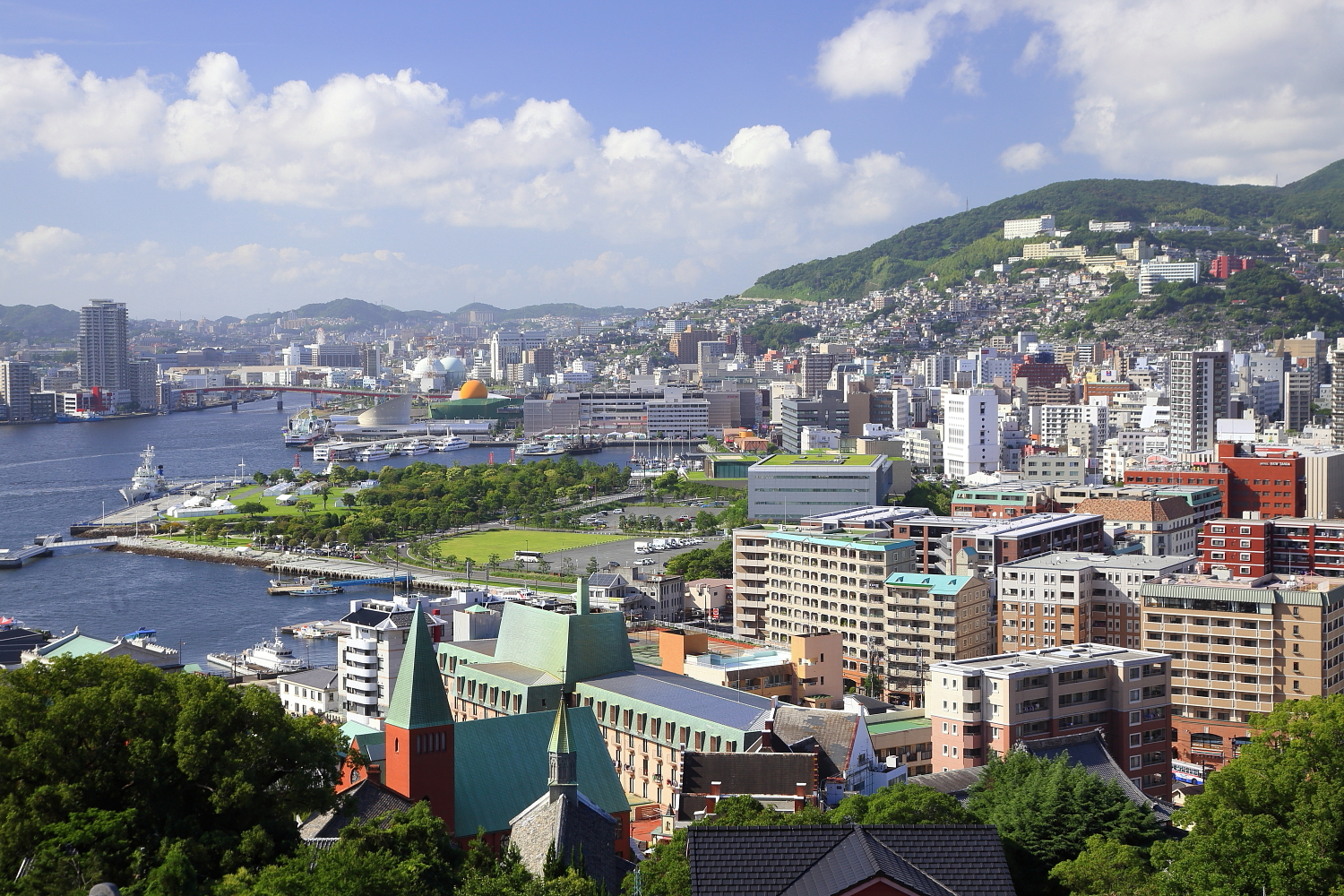
View of Nagasaki seen from Glover Garden, 2014

== Geography ==
Overview of Nagasaki in the early morning as the sun rises, 2016

Nagasaki and Nishisonogi Peninsulas are located within the city limits. The city is surrounded by the cities of Isahaya and Saikai, and the towns of Togitsu and Nagayo in Nishisonogi District.

Nagasaki lies at the head of a long bay that forms the best natural harbor on the island of Kyūshū. The main commercial and residential area of the city lies on a small plain near the end of the bay. Two rivers divided by a mountain spur form the two main valleys in which the city lies. The heavily built-up area of the city is confined by the terrain to less than 4 square miles (10 km^{2}).

=== Climate ===
Nagasaki has the typical humid subtropical climate of Kyūshū and Honshū, characterized by mild winters and long, hot, and humid summers. Apart from Kanazawa and Shizuoka, it is the wettest sizeable city in Japan. In the summer, the combination of persistent heat and high humidity results in unpleasant conditions, with wet-bulb temperatures sometimes reaching 26 °C (79 °F). In the winter, however, Nagasaki is drier and sunnier than Gotō to the west, and temperatures are slightly milder than further inland in Kyūshū. Since records began in 1878, the wettest month has been July 1982, with 1,178 millimetres (46 in) including 555 millimetres (21.9 in) in a single day, whilst the driest month has been September 1967, with 1.8 millimetres (0.07 in). Precipitation occurs year-round, though winter is the driest season; rainfall peaks sharply in June and July. August is the warmest month of the year. On January 24, 2016, a snowfall of 17 centimetres (6.7 in) was recorded.

Climate data for Nagasaki (1991−2020 normals, extremes 1878−present)
Month	Jan	Feb	Mar	Apr	May	Jun	Jul	Aug	Sep	Oct	Nov	Dec	Year
Record high °C (°F)	21.3 (70.3)	22.6 (72.7)	25.1 (77.2)	29.0 (84.2)	31.4 (88.5)	36.4 (97.5)	37.7 (99.9)	37.8 (100.0)	36.7 (98.1)	33.7 (92.7)	27.4 (81.3)	23.8 (74.8)	37.8 (100.0)
Mean maximum °C (°F)	17.2 (63.0)	18.7 (65.7)	21.6 (70.9)	25.2 (77.4)	28.3 (82.9)	30.6 (87.1)	34.4 (93.9)	35.6 (96.1)	33.1 (91.6)	29.0 (84.2)	23.8 (74.8)	19.0 (66.2)	35.9 (96.6)
Mean daily maximum °C (°F)	10.7 (51.3)	12.0 (53.6)	15.3 (59.5)	19.9 (67.8)	23.9 (75.0)	26.5 (79.7)	30.3 (86.5)	31.9 (89.4)	28.9 (84.0)	24.1 (75.4)	18.5 (65.3)	13.1 (55.6)	21.2 (70.2)
Daily mean °C (°F)	7.2 (45.0)	8.1 (46.6)	11.2 (52.2)	15.6 (60.1)	19.7 (67.5)	23.0 (73.4)	26.9 (80.4)	28.1 (82.6)	24.9 (76.8)	20.0 (68.0)	14.5 (58.1)	9.4 (48.9)	17.4 (63.3)
Mean daily minimum °C (°F)	4.0 (39.2)	4.5 (40.1)	7.5 (45.5)	11.7 (53.1)	16.1 (61.0)	20.2 (68.4)	24.5 (76.1)	25.3 (77.5)	21.9 (71.4)	16.5 (61.7)	11.0 (51.8)	6.0 (42.8)	14.1 (57.4)
Mean minimum °C (°F)	−0.6 (30.9)	−0.2 (31.6)	2.0 (35.6)	5.8 (42.4)	11.7 (53.1)	16.5 (61.7)	20.9 (69.6)	22.2 (72.0)	17.3 (63.1)	11.1 (52.0)	5.2 (41.4)	1.0 (33.8)	−1.3 (29.7)
Record low °C (°F)	−5.6 (21.9)	−4.8 (23.4)	−3.6 (25.5)	0.2 (32.4)	5.3 (41.5)	8.9 (48.0)	15.0 (59.0)	16.4 (61.5)	11.1 (52.0)	4.9 (40.8)	−0.2 (31.6)	−3.9 (25.0)	−5.6 (21.9)
Average precipitation mm (inches)	63.1 (2.48)	84.0 (3.31)	123.2 (4.85)	153.0 (6.02)	160.7 (6.33)	335.9 (13.22)	292.7 (11.52)	217.9 (8.58)	186.6 (7.35)	102.1 (4.02)	100.7 (3.96)	74.8 (2.94)	1,894.7 (74.59)
Average snowfall cm (inches)	3 (1.2)	0 (0)	0 (0)	0 (0)	0 (0)	0 (0)	0 (0)	0 (0)	0 (0)	0 (0)	0 (0)	0 (0)	4 (1.6)
Average precipitation days (≥ 0.5 mm)	10.4	10.2	11.4	10.3	10.1	14.3	11.9	10.7	9.8	6.7	9.5	10.2	125.6
Average relative humidity (%)	66	65	65	67	72	80	80	76	73	67	68	67	71
Mean monthly sunshine hours	103.7	122.3	159.5	178.1	189.6	125.0	175.3	207.0	172.2	178.9	137.2	114.3	1,863.1
Source: Japan Meteorological Agency

== Education ==
=== Universities ===
- Kwassui Women's University
- Nagasaki Institute of Applied Science
- Nagasaki Junshin Catholic University
- Nagasaki University
- Nagasaki University of Foreign Studies
- Nagasaki Wesleyan University

=== Junior colleges ===
- Nagasaki Junior College
- Nagasaki Junshin Junior College
- Nagasaki Gyokusei Junior College, formerly Tamaki Women's Junior College (玉木女子短期大学) (closed 2012)
- Nagasaki Women's Junior College

== Economy ==
- Machinery and heavy industry
- Mitsubishi
- Shipbuilding

== Transportation ==
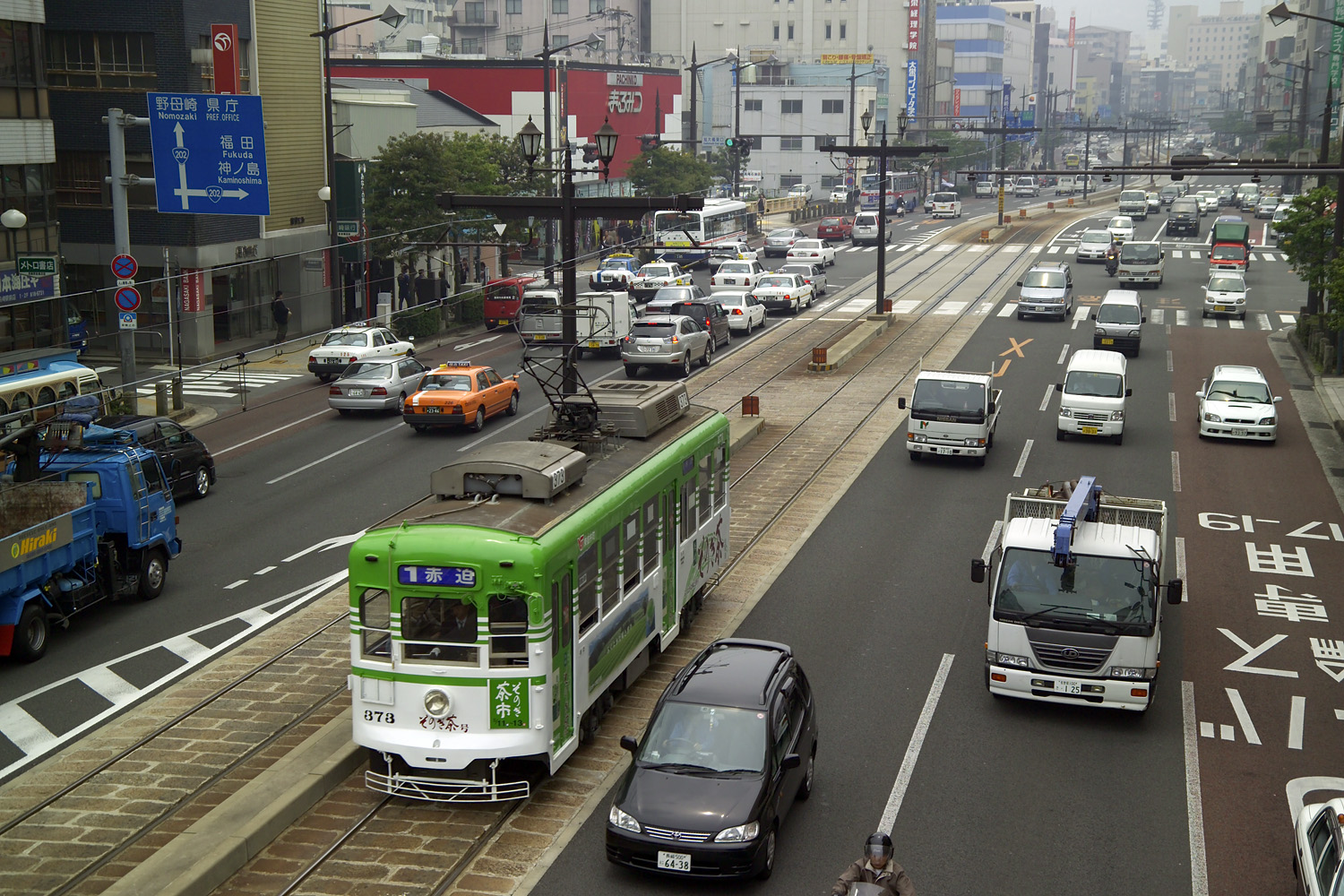
A busy street in Nagasaki

The nearest airport is Nagasaki Airport in the nearby city of Ōmura. The Kyushu Railway Company (JR Kyushu) provides rail transportation on the Nishi Kyushu Shinkansen and Nagasaki Main Line, whose terminal is at Nagasaki Station. In addition, the Nagasaki Electric Tramway operates five routes in the city. The Nagasaki Expressway serves vehicular traffic with interchanges at Nagasaki and Susukizuka. In addition, six national highways crisscross the city: Route 34, 202, 206, 251, 324, and 499.

== Demographics ==
Nagasaki prefecture population pyramid in 2020

On August 9, 1945, the population was estimated to be 263,000. As of March 1, 2017, the city had a population of 505,723 and a population density of 1,000 people per km^{2}.

== Sports ==
Nagasaki is represented in the J.League of football with its local club, V-Varen Nagasaki who play at the Peace Stadium Connected by SoftBank. Along with its local football club, Nagasaki is also represented in the second division of the B.League of basketball with Nagasaki Velca, playing their games at Happiness Arena.

== Main sites ==
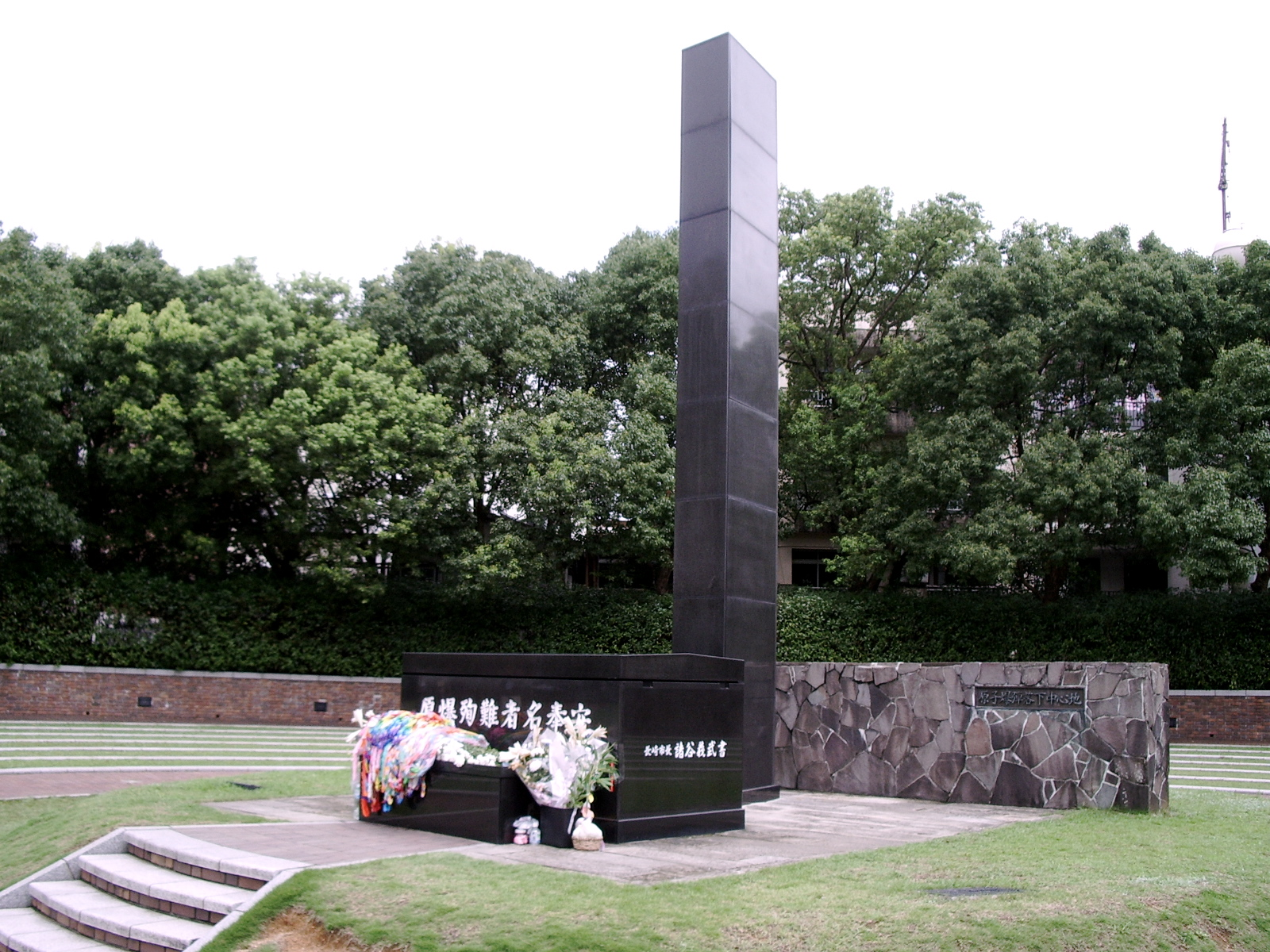
Monument at the atomic bomb hypocenter in Nagasaki

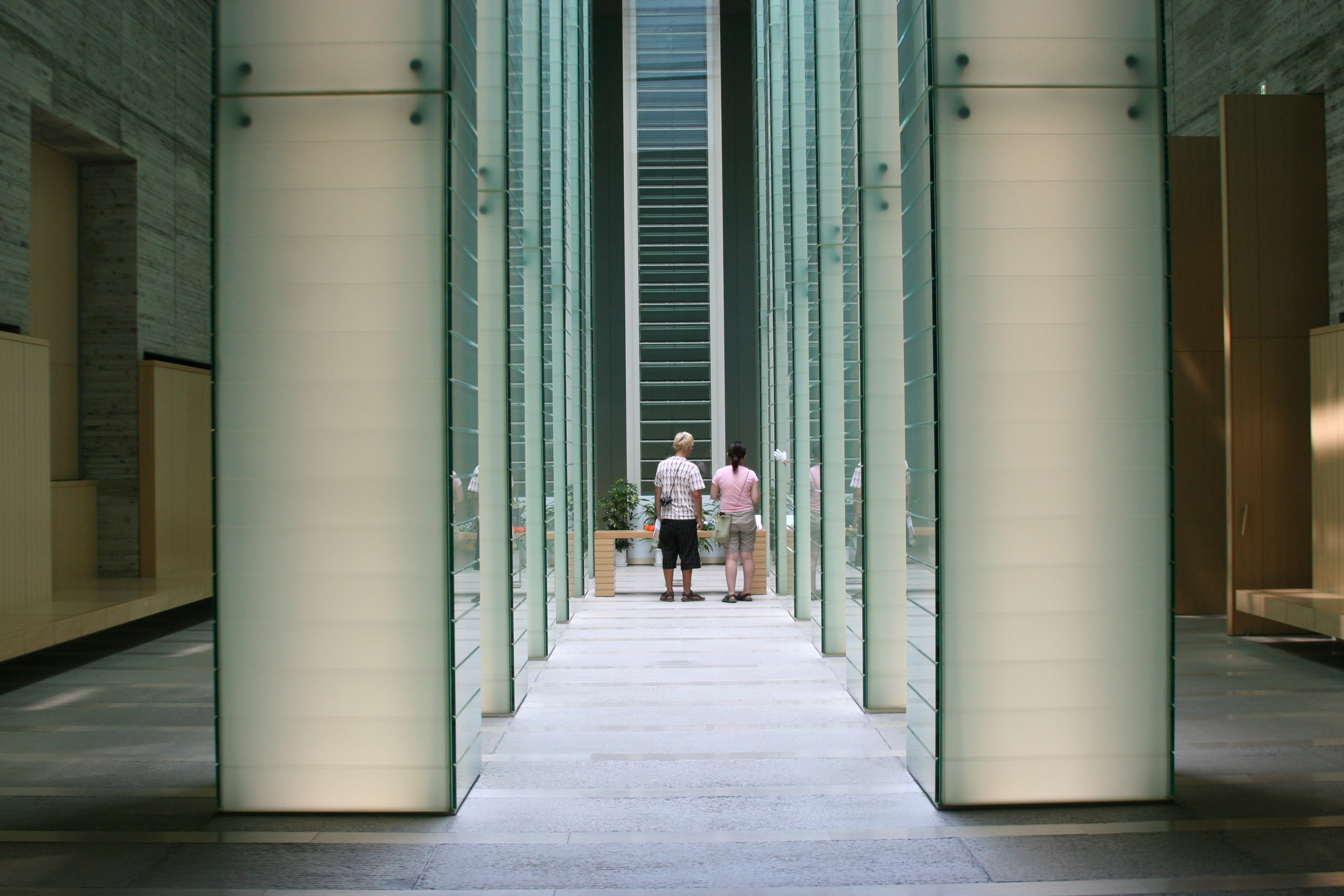
Nagasaki National Peace Memorial Hall for the Atomic Bomb Victims

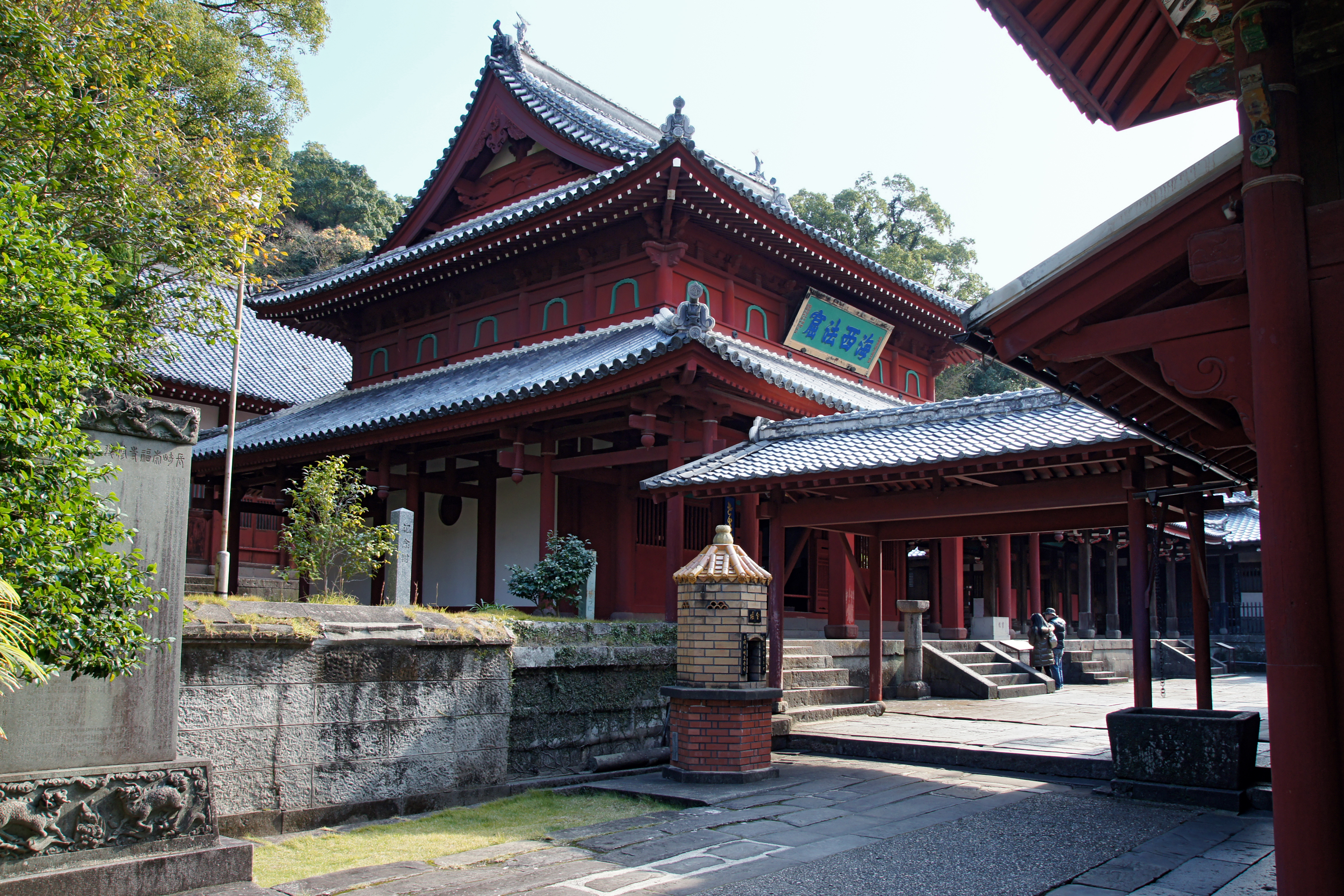
Sōfuku-ji (National treasure of Japan)

- Basilica of the Twenty-Six Holy Martyrs of Japan
- Confucius Shrine, Nagasaki
- Dejima Museum of History
- Former residence of Shuhan Takashima
- Former site of Latin Seminario
- Former site of the British Consulate in Nagasaki
- Former site of Hong Kong and Shanghai Banking Corporation Nagasaki Branch
- Glover Garden
  - Former Glover Residence
  - Former Alt Residence
  - Former Ringer Residence
  - Former Walker Residence
- Fukusai-ji
- Gunkanjima
- Higashi-Yamate Juniban Mansion
- Kazagashira Park
- Kofukuji
- Megane Bridge
- Mount Inasa
- Nagasaki Atomic Bomb Museum (located next to the Peace Park)
- Nagasaki Museum of History and Culture
- Nagasaki National Peace Memorial Hall for the Atomic Bomb Victims
- Nagasaki Peace Park
  - Atomic Bomb Hypocenter (located near the Peace Park)
- Nagasaki Peace Pagoda
- Nagasaki Penguin Aquarium
- Nagasaki Chinatown
- Nagasaki Science Museum
- Nagasaki Subtropical Botanical Garden
- Nyoko-do Hermitage
- Oranda-zaka
- Sannō Shrine – One-legged stone torii, sometimes called an arch or gateway.
- Sakamoto International Cemetery
- Shōfuku-ji
- Siebold Memorial Museum
- Sōfuku-ji – Daiyūhōden and Daiippomon are national treasures of Japan.
- Suwa Shrine
- Syusaku Endo Literature Museum
- Tateyama Park
- Twenty-Six Martyrs Museum and Monument
- Nagasaki Prefectural Art Museum
- Urakami Cathedral
- Miyo-Ken, a temple where the white snake is worshipped

=== Cityscape ===
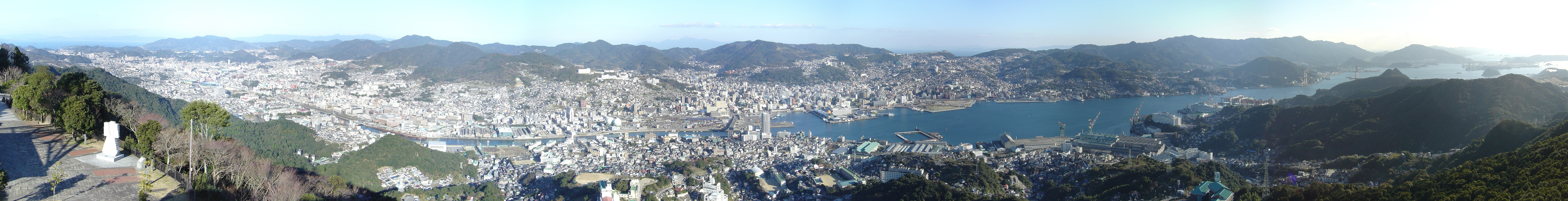
Nagasaki City seen from the Inasayama Observatory, facing southeast.

== Events ==
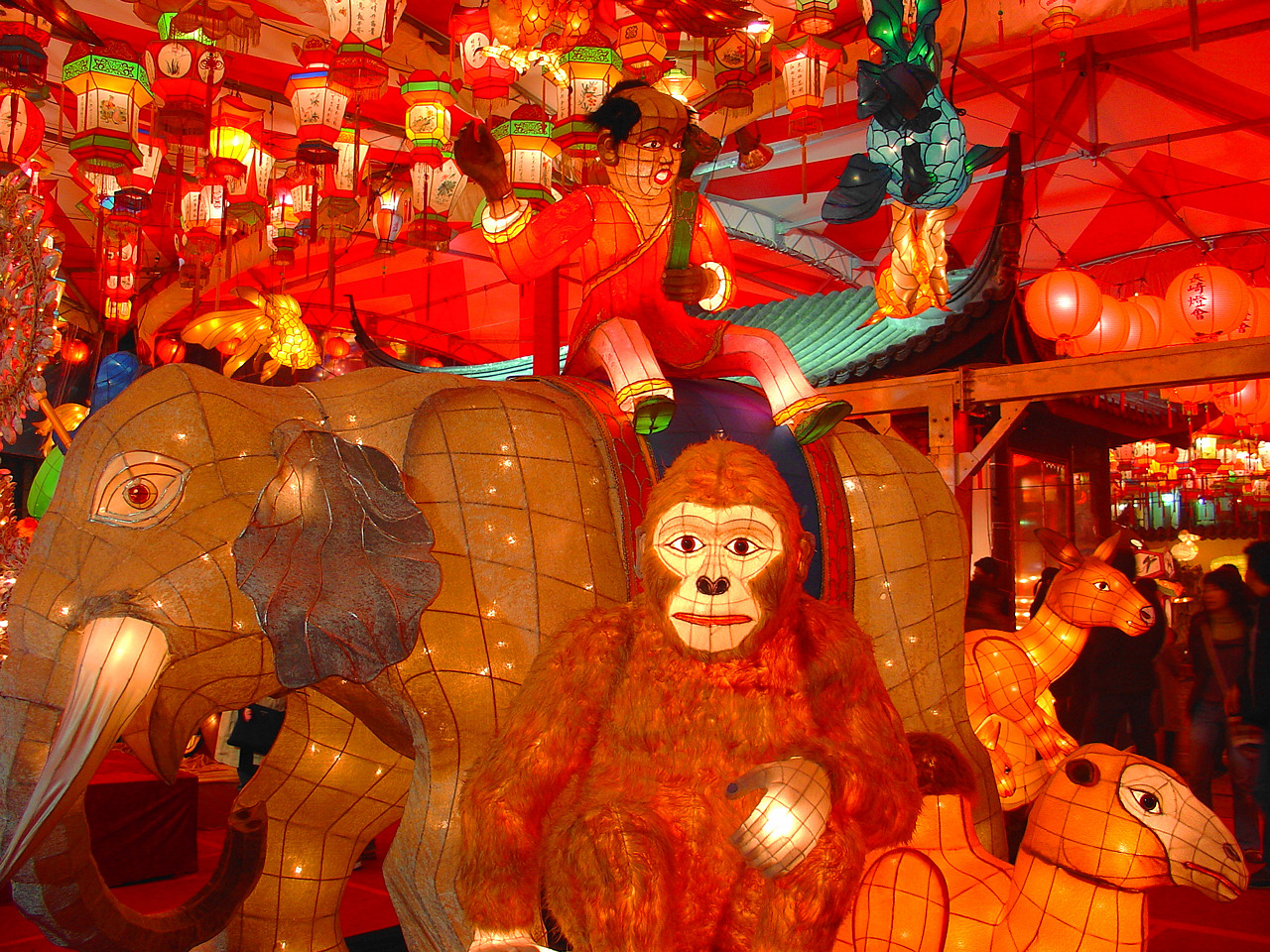
Nagasaki Lantern Festival

The Nagasaki Lantern Festival is celebrated annually over the first 15 days of Chinese New Year and is the largest of its kind in all of Japan. Kunchi, the most famous festival in Nagasaki, is held from October 7–9.

The Prince Takamatsu Cup Nishinippon Round-Kyūshū Ekiden, the world's longest relay race, begins in Nagasaki each November.

== Cuisine ==
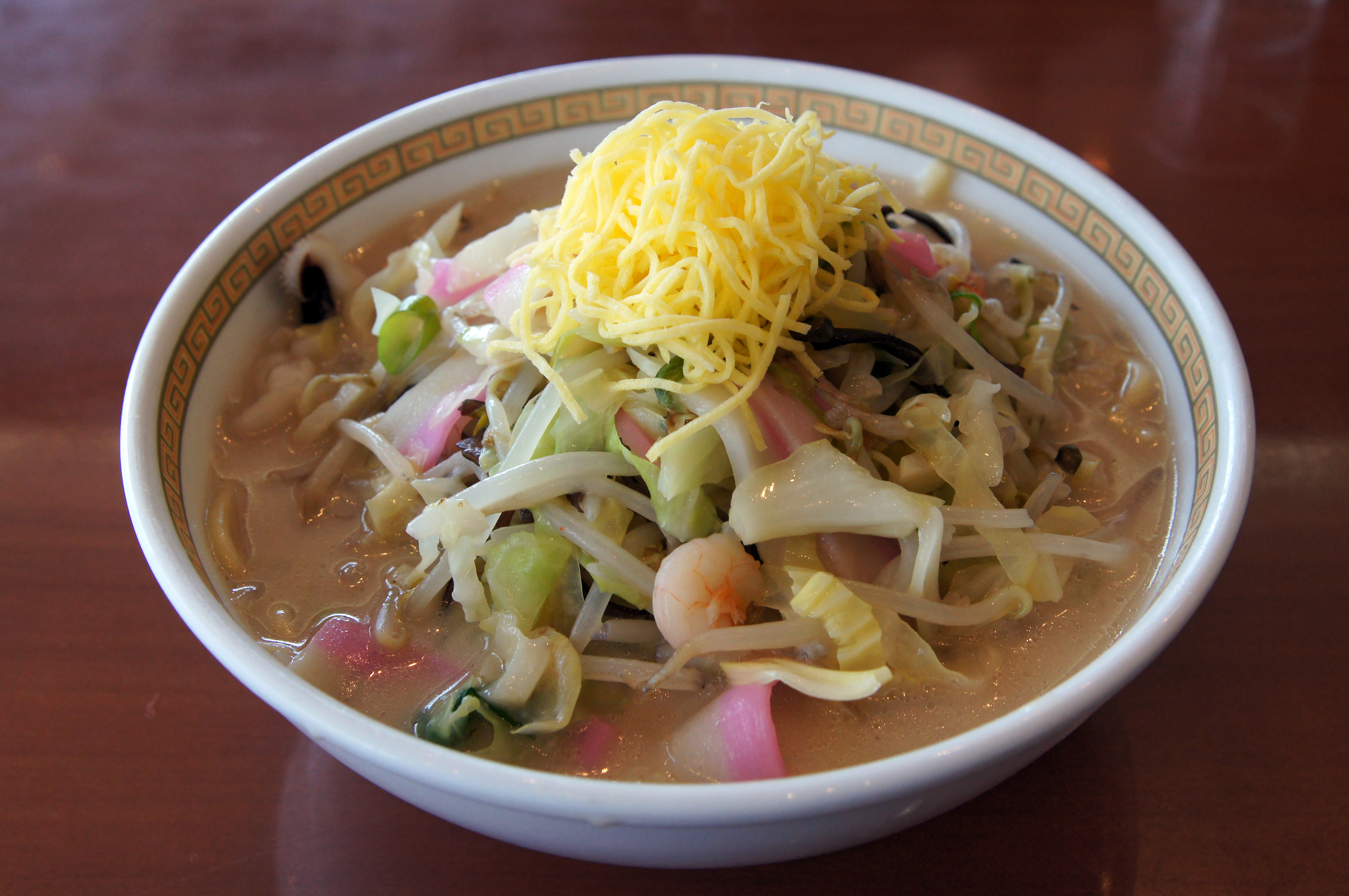
Original Shikairō Champon

- Tempura
- Nanbanzuke
- Castella
- Champon
- Sara udon
- Mogi Biwa
- Chinese confections
- Urakami Soboro
- Shippoku Cuisine
- Toruko rice (Turkish rice)
- Karasumi
- Nagasaki Kakuni

== Notable people ==
- Masaharu Fukuyama
- Mr. Gannosuke
- Kazuo Ishiguro
- Noboru Kaneko
- Mitsurou Kubo
- Ariana Miyamoto
- Neru Nagahama
- Takashi Nagai
- Keita Ogawa
- Saint Marina of Omura
- Atsushi Onita
- Kaori Sakagami
- Ryōko Tateishi
- Tsutomu Yamaguchi
- Maya Yoshida

== Sister cities ==
The city of Nagasaki maintains sister cities or friendship relations with other cities worldwide.

- Hiroshima, Japan
- St. Louis, United States (1972)
- Saint Paul, United States (1955)
- Dupnitsa, Bulgaria
- Santos, Brazil (1972)
- Fuzhou, China, (1980)
- Middelburg, Netherlands (1978)
- Porto, Portugal (1978)
- Vaux-sur-Aure, France (2005)

== See also ==
- Cultural treatments of the atomic bombings of Hiroshima and Nagasaki
- Foreign cemeteries in Japan
- Hashima Island (Gunkanjima)
- Junior College of Commerce Nagasaki University (1951-2000)

== Bibliography ==
- Groves, Leslie (1983) [1962]. Now it Can be Told: The Story of the Manhattan Project. New York: Da Capo Press. ISBN 978-0-306-80189-1. OCLC 932666584.
- Hoddeson, Lillian; Henriksen, Paul W.; Meade, Roger A.; Westfall, Catherine L. (1993). Critical Assembly: A Technical History of Los Alamos During the Oppenheimer Years, 1943–1945. New York: Cambridge University Press. ISBN 978-0-521-44132-2. OCLC 26764320.
