= Junior College of Commerce Nagasaki University =

- 長崎大学商科短期大学部
- Type: National university
- Active: 1951–2000
- Academic staff: Commerce and Economics
- Location: Nagasaki, Japan

Junior College of Commerce Nagasaki University (長崎大学商科短期大学部, Nagasaki Daigaku Shouka Tanki Daigakubu) is a junior college in Nagasaki, Japan, and is part of the Nagasaki University network. The institute was founded in 1951 and abolished in 2000.
