= Régis Jolivet =

French philosopher and priest

Régis Jolivet (8 November 1891, Lyon – 4 August 1966, Lyon) was a French philosopher and Roman Catholic priest. In 1932, he founded the school of philosophy at the Catholic University of Lyon, and was made a knight (Chevalier) of the Legion of Honour in 1961.
