= Nagasaki Junshin Catholic University =

Private university in Nagasaki Prefecture, Japan

- 長崎純心大学
- Aerial photograph of the university in 2010. Made based on National Land Image Information (Color Aerial Photographs), Ministry of Land, Infrastructure, Transport and Tourism.
- Type: Private university
- Established: 1950
- Religious affiliation: Catholic
- President: Kumiko Sakamoto
- Students: 996 (2026)
- Undergraduates: 974 (2026)
- Postgraduates: 22 (2026)
- Location: 235 Mitsuyama-machi, Nagasaki, Nagasaki Prefecture, 852-8558, Japan; 32°47′56″N 129°54′39″E
- Campus: Mitsuyama
- Colors: Blue
- Website: www.n-junshin.ac.jp/univ/

Nagasaki Junshin Catholic University (長崎純心大学, Nagasaki Junshin daigaku) is a private university in Nagasaki, Nagasaki, Japan, established in 1950. Junshin means "Immaculate Heart of Mary" in English. The school is one of the most important Catholic schools in Japan.

As of 2026 it has 996 students enrolled.

== See also ==
- Bernard Ryosuke Inagaki, professor of humanities
