= History of the Jews in Texas =

The history of the Jews in Texas dates to the arrival of the first European explorers in the 16th century, when conversos and Sephardic Jews reached the region despite Spanish restrictions on non-Catholic faiths. Organized Jewish life began in Galveston in the 1850s, and between 1907 and 1914 about ten thousand Jewish immigrants entered the United States through the port there under the Galveston Movement. As of 2024, about 221,000 Jews lived in Texas, most of them in the Dallas–Fort Worth and Houston areas.

== History of Jewish Texans ==
=== Early settlement ===
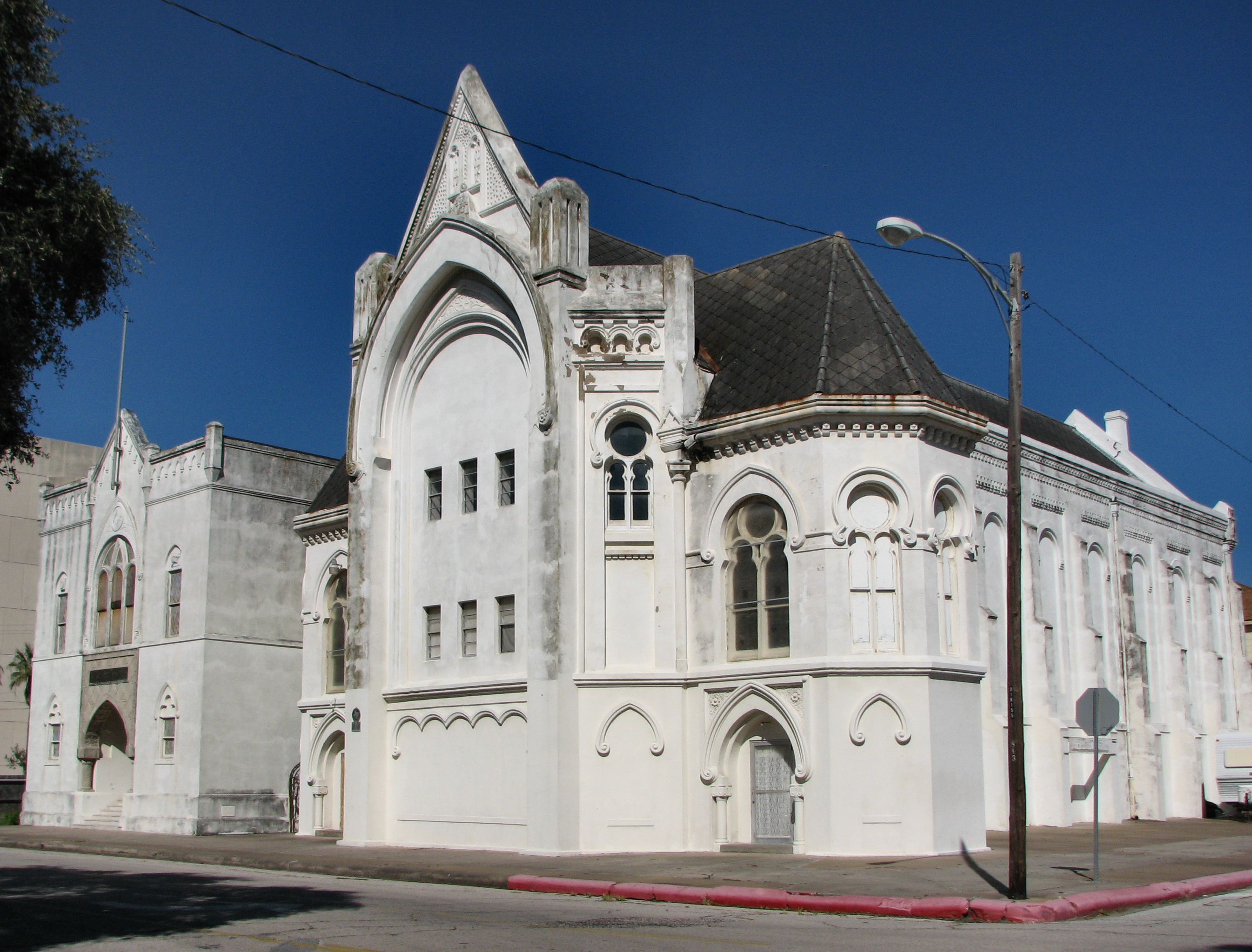
1870 Congregation B'nai Israel Temple & Henry Cohen Community House in Galveston, Texas

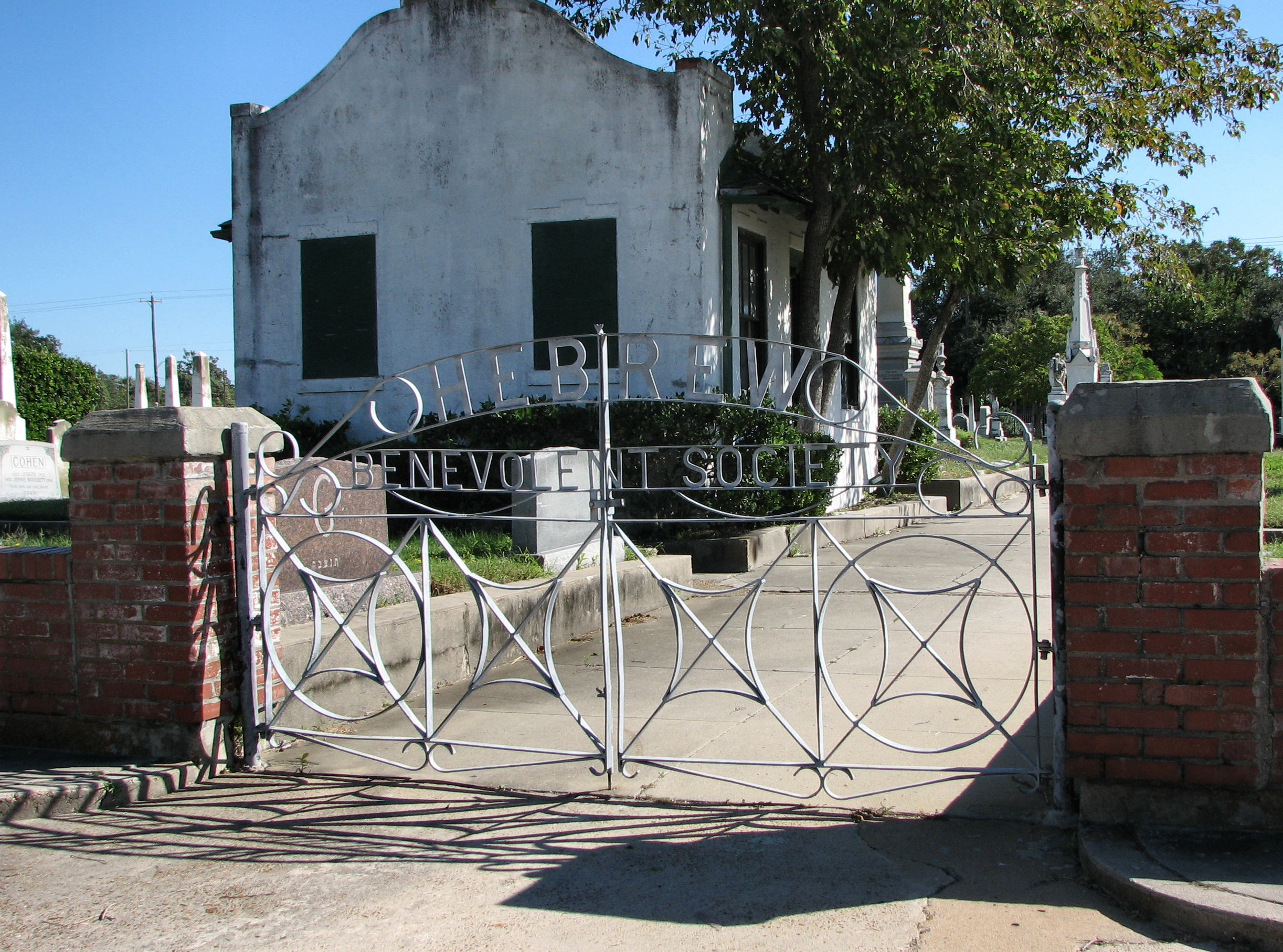
Hebrew Benevolent Cemetery (Established 1852)

Spanish Texas did not welcome easily identifiable Jews, but they came in any case. The entire Spanish Empire was governed by laws mandating strict Catholic religious uniformity and prohibited the open practice of any other faith in their territories. Jao de la Porta was with Jean Laffite at Galveston, Texas in 1816, and Maurice Henry was in Velasco in the late 1820s. Jews fought in the armies of the Texas Revolution of 1836, some with James Fannin at Goliad, others at the Battle of San Jacinto. Dr. Albert Levy became a surgeon to revolutionary Texan forces in 1835, participated in the capture of Bexar, and joined the Texas Navy the next year. In the Republic of Texas, David S. Kaufman served as the first Jewish speaker of the Texas House of Representatives. In 1842 Henri Castro, a Frenchman descended from Portuguese Jews, signed an empresario contract with the Texas government; between 1843 and 1847 he brought 485 families and 457 single men to Texas, and his first colonists settled Castroville in September 1844. The first families were conversos and Sephardic Jews. Later settlers such as the Simon family, led by Alex Simon, came in the 1860s and contributed to the construction of synagogues and monuments such as the Simon Theatre. B. Levinson, a Jewish Texan civic leader, arrived in 1861. Today the vast majority of Jewish Texans are descendants of Ashkenazi Jews, those from central and eastern Europe whose families arrived in Texas after the Civil War or later.

=== First congregations ===
Organized Judaism in Texas began in Galveston with the establishment of Texas' first Jewish cemetery in 1852 with Rev. M.N. Nathan from New Orleans officiating. By 1856 the first organized Jewish services were being held in the home of Galveston resident Isadore Dyer, which was an important step towards formal community. These services would eventually lead to the founding of Texas' first and oldest Reform Jewish congregation, Temple B'nai Israel, in 1868.

The first synagogue in Texas, Congregation Beth Israel of Houston, was founded in Houston in 1859 as an Orthodox congregation. However, by 1874 the congregation voted to change their affiliation to the fledgling Reform movement. The ensuing years were accompanied by the spread of Judaism throughout Texas. Temple Beth-El (San Antonio, Texas) was founded in San Antonio in 1874, followed by Temple Emanu-El of Dallas in 1875 and Brenham's B'nai Abraham in 1885. Congregation Beth Israel, a Reform synagogue in Austin, TX organized itself in 1876 and was chartered by the state of Texas in 1879, it is the oldest synagogue in the State’s Capital. Temple Beth-El is known as one of the state's more contemporary Reform Jewish congregations due to their very open support of the Jewish LGBT community while B'nai Abraham was long the state's oldest existing Orthodox synagogue. Maintained for decades by its last members, including Leon Toubin, the B'nai Abraham building was moved from Brenham to the Dell Jewish Community Campus in Austin for use by the Orthodox congregation Tiferet Israel.

=== Galveston Movement ===
Between 1907 and 1914, a resettlement program, known as the Galveston Movement, was in operation to divert Jewish immigrants from eastern Europe away from the crowded-immigrant cities in the Northeast. Jewish leaders wanted to spread out the population to reduce poverty, find better job opportunities, and establish Jewish communities in less packed areas. Also known as the Galveston Plan, the program was operated by several Jewish organizations. About ten thousand Jewish immigrants entered the United States through the port of Galveston during this era, roughly one-third as many as settled in Ottoman Palestine over the same period. Henry Cohen, the rabbi of B'nai Israel at the time, is credited with helping to found the Movement.

=== Antisemitism and the Ku Klux Klan ===
Texas, however, suffered from antisemitism nearly as soon as it became a state in the 19th century. Judge Roy Bean's first act as Justice of the Peace was to "shoot [...] up the saloon shack of a Jewish competitor". Judge Roy Bean then turned the tent saloon into a part-time courtroom, pronounced his own innocence, and began calling himself the "Law West of the Pecos". During the early 1920s the Ku Klux Klan became influential in Texas. Billie Mayfield edited a weekly Klan newspaper in Houston that regularly used antisemitic stereotypes to attack Jews as parasites only interested in extracting wealth from the community. In one article, Mayfield even wrote that “there are lots of good Jews in Houston and all over Texas; you find them with tombstones over their heads.” In many ways, the KKK threat helped unify the Houston Jewish community, which fought against the racist, antisemitic organization with newspaper articles, business boycotts, and legal action. By 1924, the Klan had lost much of its local support and influence, and Mayfield's newspaper went out of business.

=== 20th century ===
Even during the height of the KKK's influence, Houston Jews held powerful roles in the local economy. By the 1920s, big department stores in Houston, such as Foley's and Battlestein's, were owned by Jews. Brothers Simon and Tobias Sakowitz, who left Russia as young children, opened a clothing store in Houston in 1915 that eventually became Sakowitz's, one of the finest department stores in the city until it declared bankruptcy during the economic downturn of the 1980s and sold most of the business to an Australian company. The Sakowitz stores closed for good in 1990.

Many Jewish immigrants thrived in Houston, such as Joe Weingarten. Weingarten, who was born in Poland, became a very successful grocery store owner; he pioneered the innovations of cash-and-carry and self-service grocery stores in Houston, building a local chain that reached 70 locations by the time of his death in 1967. He was very active in Jewish social causes as well.

Among the leading philanthropists in Texas were several Jews such as Ben Taub. Taub, who was born and raised in Houston, became a leading real estate developer. In 1936 he donated 35 acres of land for the University of Houston, and he helped persuade Baylor College of Medicine to move to Houston from Dallas in 1943. When Houston's new public charity hospital opened in 1963, it was named Ben Taub General Hospital in his honor. The Jewish community in 1958, decided to build a $450,000 Jewish Institute for Medical Research, which they donated to the Baylor College of Medicine when it was completed in 1964. Leopold Meyer was a major donor and fundraiser for the Texas Children's Hospital. He was also the longtime director of two of Houston's most iconic annual events: the Livestock Show and Rodeo, and the Pin Oak Horse Show.

The Handbook of Texas states that "The formal preservation of the history of Texas Jewry goes back to Rabbi Henry Cohen of Galveston and Rabbi David Lefkowitz of Dallas, who set out to interview as many early settlers and their families as possible. They produced a historical account for the Texas Centennial in 1936." More recently, prominent Jewish Texans include the late retailer Stanley Marcus, who led Neiman Marcus of Dallas from 1950 until his retirement in 1975, and Michael Dell, founder and CEO of Dell Computer. Dell is also active in charity and civic affairs, including helping to fund the Dell Children's Medical Center in Austin. Joe Straus, elected Speaker of the Texas House of Representatives on January 13, 2009, was the first Jewish Speaker since Texas statehood.

=== 21st century ===
In August 2017, Hurricane Harvey flooded Houston neighborhoods where more than two-thirds of the city's Jewish population lived, including Meyerland. The United Orthodox Synagogues building in Meyerland, which had already been damaged by floods in 2015 and 2016, was flooded again.

In the Colleyville synagogue hostage crisis on January 15, 2022, a British gunman, Malik Faisal Akram, took four people hostage, including Rabbi Charlie Cytron-Walker, at Congregation Beth Israel in Colleyville, demanding the release of the convicted Pakistani neuroscientist Aafia Siddiqui. One hostage was released during the standoff, the remaining three escaped that night, and Akram was killed.

== Demographics ==
The Texas Almanac put the number of adherents to Judaism in Texas at around 108,000 in 1990, and later at around 120,000. By 2024, the American Jewish Year Book estimated the Jewish population of the state at about 220,840.

According to the same estimates, the largest Jewish communities in Texas are in the Dallas–Fort Worth metropolitan area, with about 87,500 Jews, followed by Greater Houston with about 62,700 and Greater San Antonio with about 17,900. These rank fourth, fifth and twenty-fourth respectively among U.S. metropolitan areas by Jewish population.

== Culture and education ==
Several Texas Holocaust museums were founded by, or with the help of, survivors who settled in the state. Henry Kellen, a survivor who moved to El Paso in 1946, began in 1984 what became the El Paso Holocaust Museum. Holocaust Museum Houston, first proposed by survivor Siegi Izakson in 1981, opened in 1996 and reopened in 2019 after a $34 million expansion. The Dallas Holocaust and Human Rights Museum, co-founded by survivor Max Glauben, opened its new building in September 2019.

The University of Texas at Austin's Schusterman Center for Jewish Studies offers an undergraduate major in Jewish studies and houses programs in Israel studies and Holocaust and genocide studies.

== Notable Jewish Texans ==
- Nolan Adams
- Steve Adler
- Ray Benson
- Henri Castro
- Henry Cohen
- Jacob De Cordova
- Jao de la Porta
- Michael Dell
- Kinky Friedman
- Martin Frost
- Craig Goldman
- Adlene Harrison
- Peter Hotez
- David S. Kaufman
- Isaac Herbert Kempner
- Jimmy Kessler
- Olga Bernstein Kohlberg
- Haymon Krupp
- Abraham Cohen Labatt
- Shimon Lazaroff
- David Lefkowitz
- Albert Levy
- Lewis MacAdams
- Herbert Marcus
- Lawrence Marcus
- Minnie Lichtenstein Marcus
- Stanley Marcus
- Abraham Lincoln Neiman
- Carrie Marcus Neiman
- Levi Olan
- Barbara Radnofsky
- Lois Roisman
- Samuel Irving Rosenman
- Jack Ruby
- Hyman Judah Schachtel
- A. R. Schwartz
- Florence Shapiro
- Jaclyn Smith
- Samuel M. Stahl
- Stanley Stein
- David E. Stern
- Adolphus Sterne
- Matt Stone
- Joe Straus
- Annette Strauss
- Robert S. Strauss
- Peter Tarlow
- Ben Taub
- Jacob Joseph Taubenhaus
- Stephen Tobolowsky
- Leon Toubin
- Marianne Williamson
- Harris Wittels
- Marvin Zindler

== Jewish communities in Texas ==
- Temple Beth-El (San Antonio, Texas)
- Congregation Beth Jacob (Galveston)
- B'nai Abraham Synagogue, Brenham
- Congregation B'nai Israel (Galveston)
- Temple Emanu-El of Dallas
- Temple Freda (Bryan-College Station)
- Chabad at Texas A&M University
- Congregation Shearith Israel (Texas)
- Congregation Beth Israel of Houston
- Temple Beth-El, Corsicana

== See also ==
- American Jewish Congress v. Bost
- History of the Jews in Brenham, Texas
- History of the Jews in Dallas
- History of the Jews in Galveston, Texas
- History of the Jews in Houston
- History of the Jews in Brazos County, Texas
- Texas Jewish Historical Society
- Texas Jewish Post
