= History of the Jews in Brenham, Texas =

The history of the Jews in Brenham, Texas; covers a period of over 140 years. As one of the first areas in Texas, outside of major population centers, to develop a sizable Jewish population, the community boasts many things of historical note. The Brenham community was formally organized in 1885.

== Early Jewish settlement ==
Early Jewish settlers arrived in Brenham, Texas, during the 1860s. With the arrival of Jewish merchants, Brenham's retail and wholesale trade expanded further. B. Levinson, an original founder, arrived in 1861. The builders of the Simon Theatre, the Simon family, arrived in 1866. These individuals became active in the business community of Brenham, Texas, and as other Jewish settlers arrived, the need for a synagogue grew. Early leaders were: Rabbi Israel L. Fink as first president, F. Susnitsky as vice president, L.Z. Harrison, J. Lewis, Abe Fink. These men were part of the 20 original charter members of B'nai Abraham Synagogue.

== B'nai Abraham Synagogue ==
B'nai Abraham Synagogue was constructed in 1893, after the first structure caught fire in 1892. Viewing the Orthodox synagogue from the outside, the building appears humble. According to James L. Hailey, "[i]n the 1990s the synagogue was believed to be the oldest Orthodox Jewish synagogue to have been in continuous use in Texas." The building was relocated to the Northwest Hills neighborhood of Austin in 2015.

The B'nai Abraham Cemetery is a Jewish cemetery located in Brenham and associated with B'nai Abraham Synagogue. It is located near Blinn College, west of Brenham's town square. This cemetery is the resting place for many notable Jewish Texans, such the Simon family and Rosa Levin Toubin.

== Simon Family and Theatre ==
Around 1850, Alex Simon (1823 – October 4, 1906), a citizen of The Republic of Texas who was born in Pyzdry, Poland, to Michael Gabryel and Ruchel Simon and grew up in Konin, Poland, arrived in Brenham. His arrival marked the beginning of the influential Simon family's involvement in the Brenham Jewish community. Alex Simon was one of the founders and builders of the B'nai Abraham Synagogue. According to architect Robert P. Davis, "[h]e was also one of the principal investors in the Gulf, Colorado and Santa Fe Railroad...which brought Jewish immigrants up from Galveston through the Brazos River valley to Bryan and out to San Angelo." Alex Simon's son, James Simon (March 8, 1858 – August 1, 1925) is known for having financed the construction of the Simon Theatre. Historically, Simon family members have been buried at the B'nai Abraham Cemetery.

== Community Historians ==
The history of the Brenham community has been written by the Jewish Texan historian, Rosa Levin Toubin (June 21, 1897 – August 14, 1989). A Brenham native, Rosa Levin Toubin, daughter of Joe Levin (September 21, 1874 – March 20, 1954) who was a founder of the B'nai Abraham Synagogue. Rosa Levin Toubin attended Blinn College and Rice University and on June 26, 1925, she married Sam H. Toubin (August 25, 1892 – September 17, 1982) who "owned and operated the New York stores in nine towns in Texas". Concerning the Brenham community, in 1980 Rosa Levin "Mrs. Sam" Toubin wrote the texts, Colorful Brenham Community has history of over 120 years. and History of B'nai Abraham Synagogue.

Leon Toubin, a Jewish Texan community and business leader, is the present caretaker of B'nai Abraham Synagogue and the spokesperson for the community. In the text Lone Stars of David: The Jews of Texas, Leon Toubin discusses the history of the Brenham community. He states that the synagogue has "holy scriptures and everything ... [the] only thing we need is Jewish people." In the text, Growing Up Jewish in America: An Oral History, Toubin discusses the descendants of the Brenham community and states that at one time they, "were probably all Jewish once, but we're Lutheran now".

Toubin tells a similar story for the PBS special one-hour documentary, At Home on the Range: Jewish Life in Texas. This story concerns former Washington County Sheriff Goldberg. Toubin states that, "The sheriff we had here was named Goldberg. I got a call from a Goldberg in Houston. He said: 'Leon, I want to ask you a question. There’s a sheriff in Brenham named Goldberg, is he Jewish?' So I stopped him on the street one day and said: 'Sheriff I want to ask you a question. Are you Jewish?' The sheriff said: 'Leon, I was probably Jewish. But the family came here and there weren’t any Jewish girls to marry. Everyone intermarried and I'm Lutheran today. But I was probably Jewish at one time."

== Brenham State School ==
The Jewish residents of the Brenham State School have a history of celebrating Jewish holidays. The Houston Chronicle reported that five Jewish residents from Brenham State School participated in Rosh Hashana with the Richmond State School in 2000. The Jewish residents of the Brenham State School also celebrated Passover with the Richmond State School in 2002.

On September 18, 2006, Congregation Beth El of Missouri City, Texas, participated in celebrating the High Holy Days with Jewish residents from both State Schools. These services were led by Rabbi Dovid Goldstein from the Chabad outreach in Houston.

== American Jewish Congress v. Bost ==
American Jewish Congress v. Bost is an Establishment Clause lawsuit concerning the separation of church and state in Brenham, Texas. The case is the first constitutional challenge to a charitable choice contract. In the community of Brenham, the American Jewish Congress and the Texas Civil Rights Project filed a lawsuit against a social services program that they believed used a tax-funded jobs program to support religious practices that violated the separation of church and state. Other accusations include use of funds to proselytize, purchase bibles, and coerce participants to "accept Jesus".

On May 21, 2002, the Houston Chronicle reported that the case would be sent to federal district court. The lawsuit went back and forth between state and federal courts and was twice appealed. In January 2003, the lawsuit that is believed to be the first constitutional challenge to a "charitable choice" contract, came to a conclusion. The case was finally dismissed "on the ground that there was no live controversy".

== Recognition ==
The September 30, 2005, edition of USA Today listed the Brenham community as one of "10 great places to share history of the Jewish faith".

== See also ==
- History of the Jews in the United States
- Jewish history in Texas
- Texas Jewish Historical Society
