= History of the Jews in the United States =

Location of the United States (dark green) in North America on a world map.

The history of the Jews in the United States dates back to the 1600s and 1700s. Jewish communities have existed in the United States since colonial times, and Jewish individuals lived in various cities before the American Revolution. Early Jewish communities were primarily composed of Sephardi immigrants from Brazil, Amsterdam, or England, many of them fled from the Inquisition.

Private and civically unrecognized local, regional, and sometimes international networks were noted in these groups in order to facilitate marriage and business ties. This small and private colonial community largely existed as a community of undeclared and non-practicing Jews, a large number of them decided to marry non-Jews. Later on, the much larger community of Ashkenazi Jews which would populate New York, New Jersey, and other regions of what would become the United States altered these demographic trends.

Until the 1830s, the Jewish community of Charleston, South Carolina, was the largest in North America. In the late 1800s and the beginning of the 1900s, many Jewish immigrants arrived from Europe. For example, many German Jews arrived in the middle of the 19th century, established clothing stores in towns across the country, formed Reform synagogues, and were active in banking in New York. Immigration of Eastern Yiddish-speaking Ashkenazi Jews, in 1880–1914, brought a new wave of Jewish immigration to New York City, including many who became active in socialism and labor movements, as well as Orthodox and Conservative Jews.

Refugees from diaspora communities in Europe settled in the United States both during and after the Holocaust and after 1970, Jews from the Soviet Union settled in the United States. Politically, American Jews have been especially active as part of the liberal New Deal coalition of the Democratic Party since the 1930s, but recently, a conservative Republican constituent has emerged within the Orthodox Jewish community. They have displayed high education levels and high rates of upward social mobility compared to several other ethnic and religious groups inside America. The Jewish communities in small towns have declined, with the population becoming increasingly concentrated in large metropolitan areas. Antisemitism in the U.S. has endured into the 21st century, although numerous cultural changes have taken place such as the election of many Jews into governmental positions at the local, state, and national levels.

In the 1940s, Jews comprised 3.7% of the national population. As of 2019, at about 7.1 million, the population is 2% of the national total—and shrinking as a result of low birth rates and Jewish assimilation. The largest Jewish population centers are the metropolitan areas of New York (2.1 million), Los Angeles (617,000), Miami (527,750), Washington, D.C. (297,290), Chicago (294,280), and Philadelphia (292,450).

== Jewish immigration ==
The Jewish population of the U.S. is the product of waves of immigration primarily from diaspora communities in Europe; emigration was initially inspired by the pull of American social and entrepreneurial opportunities, and later was a refuge from the peril of ongoing antisemitism in Europe. Few ever returned to Europe, although many have made aliyah to Israel. Statistics demonstrate that there was a myth that no Jews returned to their previous diasporic lands, but while the rate was around 6%, it was much lower than for other ethnic groups.

From a population of 1,000–2,000 Jewish residents in 1790, mostly Sephardic Jews who had immigrated to Great Britain and the Dutch Republic, the American Jewish community grew to about 15,000 by 1840, and to about 250,000 by 1880. Most of the mid-19th century Ashkenazi Jewish immigrants to the U.S. came from diaspora communities in German-speaking states, in addition to the larger concurrent Christian German migration. They initially spoke German, and settled across the nation, assimilating with their new countrymen; the Jews among them commonly engaged in trade, manufacturing, and operated dry goods (clothing) stores in many cities.

Between 1880 and the start of World War I in 1914, about 2,000,000 Yiddish-speaking Ashkenazi Jews immigrated from diaspora communities in Eastern Europe, where repeated pogroms made life untenable. They came from Jewish diaspora communities of Russia, the Pale of Settlement (modern Poland, Lithuania, Belarus, Ukraine, and Moldova), and the Russian-controlled portions of Poland. The latter group clustered in New York City, created the garment industry there, which supplied the dry goods stores across the country, and were heavily engaged in the trade unions. They immigrated alongside non-Jewish eastern and southern European immigrants, which was unlike the historically predominant American demographic from northern and western Europe; records indicate between 1880 and 1920 that these new immigrants rose from less than five percent of all European immigrants to nearly 50%. This change caused renewed nativist sentiment, the birth of the Immigration Restriction League, and congressional studies by the Dillingham Commission from 1907 to 1911. The Emergency Quota Act of 1921 established immigration restrictions specifically on these groups, and the Immigration Act of 1924 further tightened and codified these limits. With the ensuing Great Depression, and despite worsening conditions for Jews in Europe with the rise of Nazi Germany, these quotas remained in place with minor alterations until the Immigration and Nationality Act of 1965.

Jews quickly created support networks consisting of many small synagogues and Ashkenazi Jewish Landsmannschaften (German for "Territorial Associations") for Jews from the same town or village.

Leaders of the time urged assimilation and integration into the wider American culture, and Jews quickly became part of American life. During World War II, 500,000 American Jews, about half of all Jewish males between 18 and 50, enlisted for service, and after the war, Jewish families joined the new trend of suburbanization, as they became wealthier and more mobile. The Jewish community expanded to other major cities, particularly around Los Angeles and Miami. Their young people attended secular high schools and colleges and met non-Jews, so that intermarriage rates soared to nearly 50%. Synagogue membership, however, grew considerably, from 20% of the Jewish population in 1930 to 60% in 1960.

The earlier waves of immigration and immigration restriction were followed by the Holocaust that destroyed most of the European Jewish community by 1945; these also made the United States the home for the largest Jewish diaspora population in the world. In 1900 there were 1.5 million American Jews; in 2005 there were 5.3 million. See Historical Jewish population comparisons.

The most recent Jewish communities to immigrate to the United States en masse are Iranian Jews, who primarily immigrated to the United States in the aftermath of the Islamic Revolution, and Soviet Jews who came after the fall of the Soviet Union.

On a theological level, American Jews are divided into a number of Jewish denominations, of which the most numerous are Reform Judaism, Conservative Judaism and Orthodox Judaism. However, roughly 25% of American Jews are unaffiliated with any denomination. Conservative Judaism arose in America and Reform Judaism was founded in Germany and popularized by American Jews.

== Colonial era ==
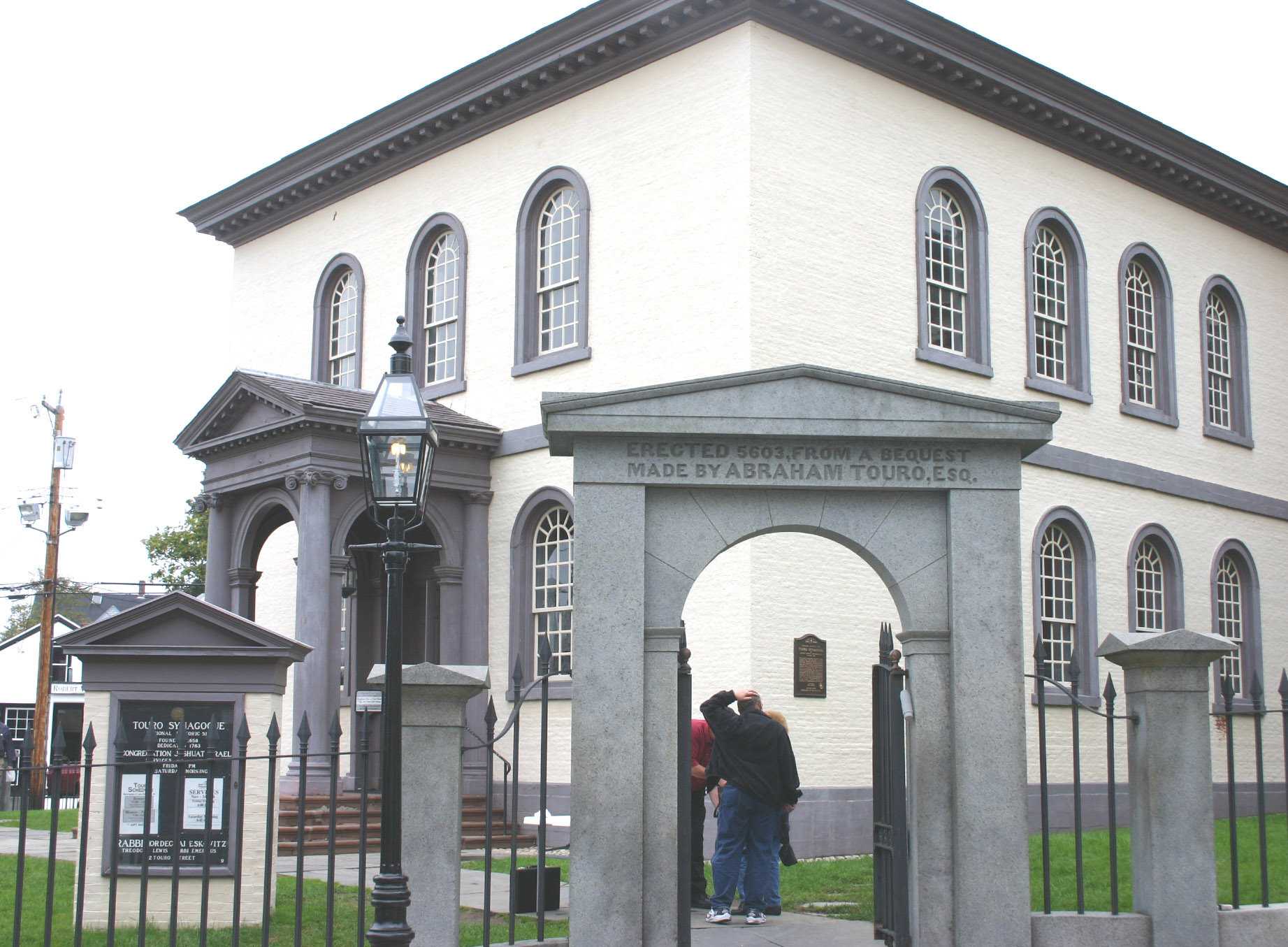
Touro Synagogue, built in 1759 in Newport, Rhode Island, is America's oldest surviving synagogue.

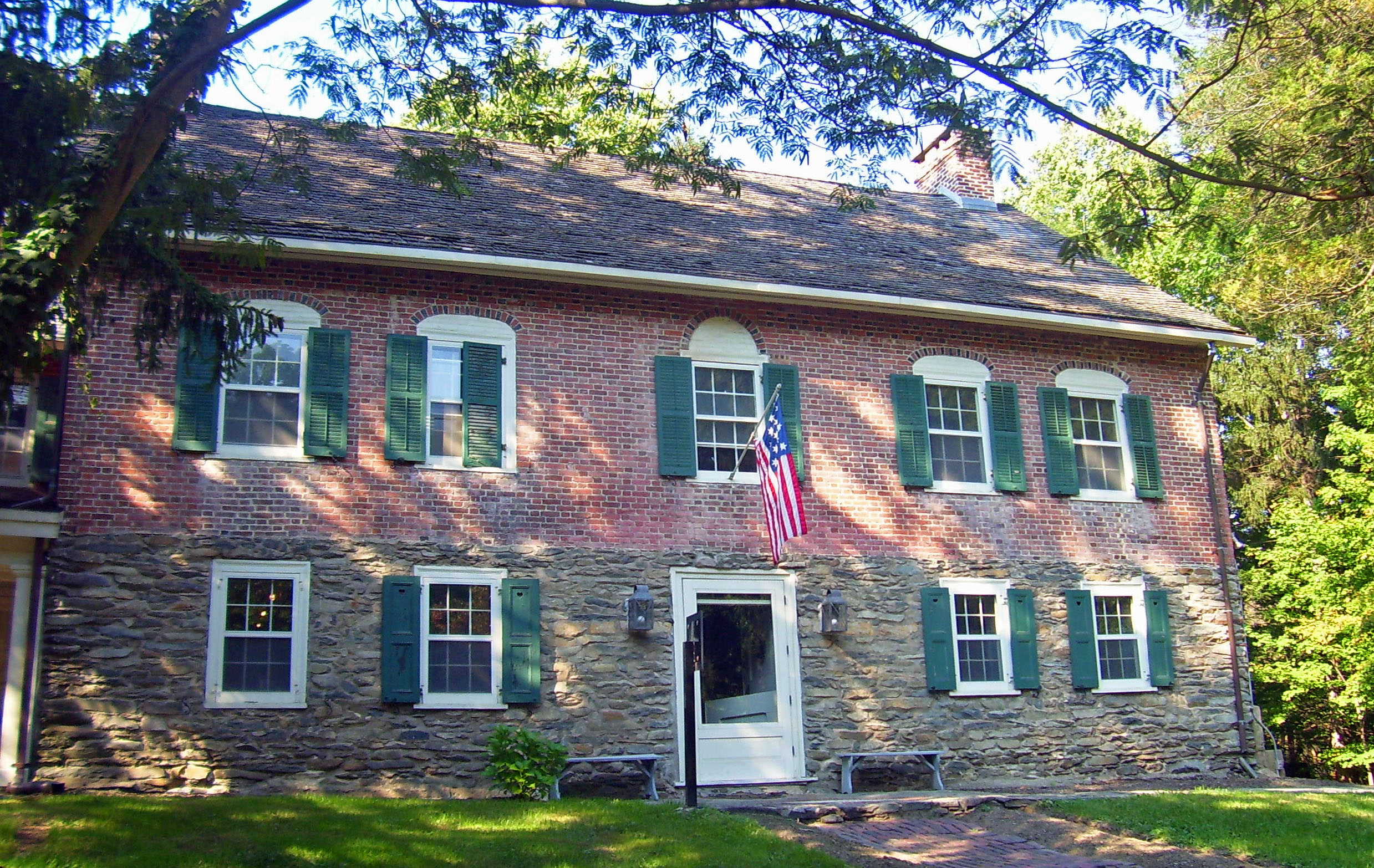
The Gomez Mill House, built in 1714 near Marlboro, New York by a Sephardic Jew from Portugal. Earliest surviving Jewish residence in the U.S.

Luis de Carabajal y Cueva, a Spanish conquistador and converso first set foot in what is now Texas in 1570. The first Jewish-born person to set foot on American soil was Joachim Gans in 1584. Elias Legarde (a.k.a. Legardo) was a Sephardic Jew who arrived at James City, Virginia, on the Abigail in 1621. According to Leon Huhner, Legarde was from Languedoc, France, and was hired to go to the Colony to teach people how to grow grapes for wine. Elias Legarde was living in Buckroe in Elizabeth City in February 1624. Legarde was employed by Anthonie Bonall, who was a French silk maker and vigneron (cultivator of vineyards for winemaking), one of the men from Languedoc sent to the colony by John Bonall, keeper of the silkworms of King James I. In 1628, Legarde leased 100 acres (40 ha) on the west side of Harris Creek in Elizabeth City. Josef Mosse and Rebecca Isaake are documented in Elizabeth City in 1624. John Levy patented 200 acres (81 ha) of land on the main branch of Powell's Creek, Virginia, around 1648, Albino Lupo who traded with his brother, Amaso de Tores, in London. Two brothers named Silvedo and Manuel Rodriguez are documented to be in Lancaster County, Virginia, around 1650. None of the Jews in Virginia were forced to leave under any conditions.

Solomon Franco, a Jewish merchant, arrived in Boston in 1649; subsequently, he was given a stipend from the Puritans there, on the condition that he leave on the next passage back to Holland. In September 1654, shortly before the Jewish New Year, twenty-three Jews from the Sephardic community in the Netherlands, coming from Recife, Brazil, then a Dutch colony, arrived in New Amsterdam (New York City). Governor Peter Stuyvesant tried to enhance his Dutch Reformed Church by discriminating against other religions, but religious pluralism was already a tradition in the Netherlands and his superiors at the Dutch West India Company in Amsterdam overruled him. In 1664 the English conquered New Amsterdam and renamed it New York.

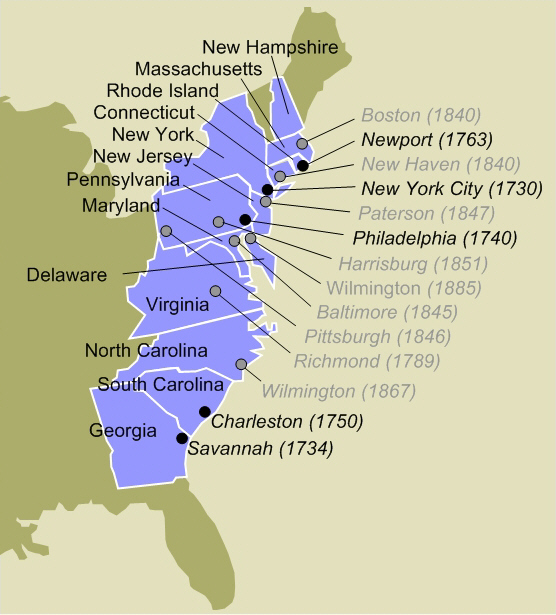
A map of Jewish congregations in the Thirteen British North American colonies.

Religious tolerance was also established elsewhere in the colonies. The charter of the colony of South Carolina granted liberty of conscience to all settlers, expressly mentioning "Jews, heathens, and dissenters." As a result, Charleston, South Carolina has a particularly long history of Sephardic settlement, which, in 1816, numbered over 600—then the largest Jewish population of any city in the United States. Sephardic Dutch Jews were also among the early settlers of Newport (where Touro Synagogue, the country's oldest surviving synagogue building, stands), Savannah, Philadelphia and Baltimore. In New York City, Congregation Shearith Israel is the oldest continuous congregation started in 1687 having their first synagogue erected in 1728, and its current building still houses some of the original pieces of that first.

== Revolutionary era ==
By the beginning of the Revolutionary War in 1776, around 2,000 Jews lived in the British North American colonies, most of them Sephardic Jews who immigrated from the Dutch Republic, Great Britain, and the Iberian Peninsula. Many American Jews supported the Patriot cause, with some enlisting in the Continental Army; South Carolinian planter Francis Salvador became the first American Jew to be killed in action during the war, while businessman Haym Solomon joined the New York branch of the Sons of Liberty and became one of the key financiers to the Continental Army. The highest ranking Jewish officer in the Patriot forces was Colonel Mordecai Sheftall; whether or not Brigadier general Moses Hazen was Jewish is still the subject of debate among historians. Other American Jews, including David Franks, suffered from their association with Continental Army officer Benedict Arnold (Franks served Arnold as an aide-de-camp) during his defection to the British in 1780.

U.S. President George Washington remembered the Jewish contribution when he wrote to the Sephardic congregation of Newport, Rhode Island, in a letter dated August 17, 1790:

May the children of the stock of Abraham who dwell in the land continue to merit and enjoy the goodwill of the other inhabitants. While everyone shall sit safely under his own vine and fig-tree and there shall be none to make him afraid.

A small Jewish community had developed in Newport over the 18th century; this included Aaron Lopez, a Jewish merchant who played a significant role in the town's involvement in the slave trade.

In 1790, the approximate 2,500-strong American Jewish community faced a number of legal restrictions in various states that prevented non-Christians from holding public office and voting, though the state governments of Delaware, Pennsylvania, South Carolina, and Georgia soon eliminated these barriers, as did the U.S. Bill of Rights in 1791 more generally. Sephardic Jews became active in community affairs in the 1790s, after achieving "political equality in the five states in which they were most numerous." Other barriers did not officially fall for decades in the states of Rhode Island (1842), North Carolina (1868), and New Hampshire (1877). Despite these restrictions, which were often enforced unevenly, there were really too few Jews in 17th- and 18th-century America for anti-Jewish incidents to become a significant social or political phenomenon at the time. The evolution of Jews from toleration to full civil and political equality that followed the American Revolution helped ensure that antisemitism would never become as common as in Europe.

== 19th century ==
Following traditional religious and cultural teachings about improving the lot of their brethren, Jewish residents in the United States began to organize their communities in the early 19th century. Early examples include a Jewish orphanage set up in Charleston, South Carolina in 1801, and the first Jewish school, Polonies Talmud Torah, established in New York in 1806. In 1843, the first national secular Jewish organization in the United States, the B'nai B'rith was established.

Jewish Texans have been a part of Texas History since the first European explorers arrived in the 16th century. Spanish Texas did not welcome easily identifiable Jews, but they came in any case. Jao de la Porta was with Jean Laffite at Galveston, Texas in 1816, and Maurice Henry was in Velasco in the late 1820s. Jews fought in the armies of the Texas Revolution of 1836, some with Fannin at Goliad, others at San Jacinto. Dr. Albert Levy became a surgeon to revolutionary Texan forces in 1835, participated in the capture of Béxar, and joined the Texas Navy the next year.

By 1840, Jews constituted a tiny, but nonetheless stable, middle-class minority of about 15,000 out of the 17 million Americans counted by the U.S. Census. Niles' National Register reported in April 1843 that the Jewish population in the United States numbered 60,000 and few synagogues, numbering six in New York, three in Cleveland, two in Philadelphia, one in Baltimore, one in Newport, Rhode Island, and a handful of others. Jews intermarried rather freely with non-Jews, continuing a trend that had begun at least a century earlier. As immigration increased with European political instability and the Revolutions of 1848, negative stereotypes of Jews in newspapers, literature, drama, art, and popular culture grew more commonplace, and physical attacks more frequent.

During the 19th century, (especially the 1840s and 1850s), Jewish immigration was primarily of Ashkenazi Jews from Germany, bringing a liberal, educated population that had experience with the Haskalah, or Jewish Enlightenment. It was in the United States during the 19th century that two of the major branches of Judaism were established by these German immigrants: first Reform Judaism out of German Reform Judaism, and towards Conservative Judaism as a subsequent reaction to the perceived liberalness of Reform Judaism.

=== Civil War ===
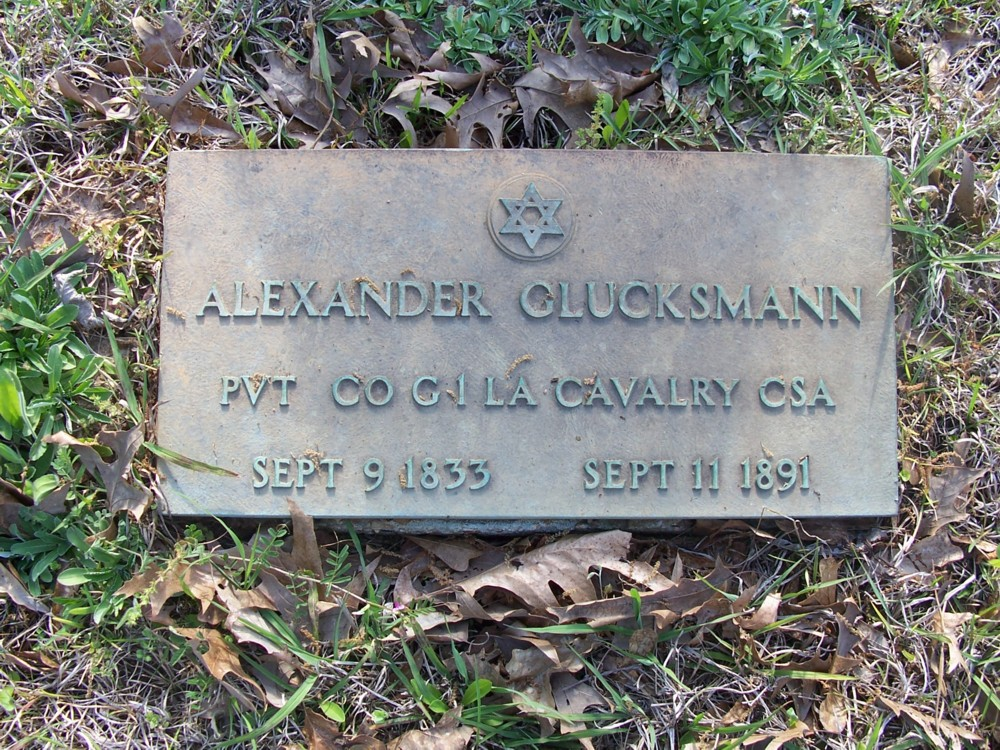
Grave of Jewish Confederate soldier near Clinton, Louisiana

During the American Civil War, approximately 3,000 Jews (out of around 150,000 Jews in the United States) fought on the Confederate side and 7,000 fought on the Union side. Jews also played leadership roles on both sides, with nine Jewish generals serving in the Union Army, the most notable of whom were brigadier generals Edward S. Salomon (who attained the rank at the age of 29) and Frederick Knefler. There were also twenty-one Jewish colonels who fought for the Union, including Marcus M. Spiegel of Ohio. and Max Friedman, who commanded the 65th Pennsylvania Regiment, 5th Cavalry, known as Cameron's Dragoons or the Cameron Dragoons, which had a sizable number of German Jewish immigrants from Philadelphia in its ranks. Several dozens of Jewish officers also fought for the Confederacy, most notably Colonel Abraham Charles Myers, a West Point graduate and quartermaster general of the Confederate Army.

Judah P. Benjamin served as Attorney General, Secretary of War, and Secretary of State of the Confederacy.

Several Jewish bankers played key roles in providing government financing for both sides of the Civil War: the Speyer family and the Seligman family for the Union, and Emile Erlanger and Company for the Confederacy.

In December 1862 Major General Ulysses S. Grant, angry at the illegal trade in smuggled cotton, issued General Order No. 11 expelling Jews from areas under his control in western Tennessee, Mississippi and Kentucky:

The Jews, as a class violating every regulation of trade established by the Treasury Department and also department orders, are hereby expelled ... within twenty-four hours from the receipt of this order.

Jews appealed to President Abraham Lincoln, who immediately ordered General Grant to rescind the order. Sarna notes that there was a "surge in many forms of anti-Jewish intolerance" at the time. Sarna, however, concludes that the long-term implications were highly favorable, for the episode:

also empowered Jews with the knowledge that they could fight back against bigotry and win, even against a prominent general. The overturning of Grant's order, especially on top of the victory in the chaplaincy affair, appreciably strengthened the Jewish community and increased its self-confidence. The successes also validated an activist Jewish communal policy that based claims to equality on American law and values, while relying on help from public officials to combat prejudice and defend Jews' minority rights.

=== Participation in politics ===
Jews also began to organize as a political group in the United States, especially in response to the United States reaction to the 1840 Damascus Blood Libel. The first Jewish member of the United States House of Representatives, Lewis Charles Levin, and Senator David Levy Yulee, were elected in 1845 (although Yulee converted to Episcopalianism the following year). Official government antisemitism continued, however, with New Hampshire only offering equality to Jews and Catholics in 1877, the last state to do so.

Grant very much regretted his wartime order; he publicly apologized for it. When he became president in 1869, he set out to make amends. Sarna argues:

Eager to prove that he was above prejudice, Grant appointed more Jews to public office than had any of his predecessors and, in the name of human rights, he extended unprecedented support to persecuted Jews in Russia and Romania. Time and again, partly as a result of this enlarged vision of what it meant to be an American and partly in order to live down General Orders No. 11, Grant consciously worked to assist Jews and secure them equality. ... Through his appointments and policies, Grant rejected calls for a 'Christian nation' and embraced Jews as insiders in America, part of "we the people." During his administration, Jews achieved heightened status on the national scene, anti-Jewish prejudice declined, and Jews look forward optimistically to a liberal epoch characterized by sensitivity to human rights and interreligious cooperation.

=== Banking ===
In the middle of the 19th century, a number of German Jews founded investment banking firms which later became mainstays of the industry. Most prominent Jewish banks in the United States were investment banks, rather than commercial banks. Important banking firms included Goldman Sachs (founded by Samuel Sachs and Marcus Goldman), Kuhn Loeb (Solomon Loeb and Jacob Schiff), Lehman Brothers (Henry Lehman), Salomon Brothers, and Bache & Co. (founded by Jules Bache). J. & W. Seligman & Co. was a large investment bank from the 1860s to the 1920s. By the 1930s, Jewish presence in private investment banking had diminished dramatically.

=== Western settlements ===
In the nineteenth-century, Jews began settling throughout the American West. The majority were immigrants, with German Jews comprising most of the early nineteenth-century wave of Jewish immigration to the United States and therefore to the Western states and territories, while Eastern European Jews migrated in greater numbers and comprised most of the migratory westward wave at the close of the century. Following the California Gold Rush of 1849, Jews established themselves prominently on the West Coast, with important settlements in Portland, Oregon; Seattle, Washington; and especially San Francisco, which became the second-largest Jewish city in the nation.

Eisenberg, Kahn, and Toll (2009) emphasize the creative freedom Jews found in western society, unburdening them from past traditions and opening up new opportunities for entrepreneurship, philanthropy, and civic leadership. Regardless of origin, many early Jewish settlers worked as peddlers before establishing themselves as merchants. Numerous entrepreneurs opened shop in large cities like San Francisco to service the mining industry, as well as in smaller communities like Deadwood, South Dakota and Bisbee, Arizona, which sprung up throughout the resource-rich West. The most popular specialty was clothing merchant, followed by the small-scale manufacturing and general retailing. For example, Levi Strauss (1829 – 1902) started as a wholesale dealer in with clothing, bedding, and notions; by 1873 he introduced the first blue jeans, an immediate hit for miners, and later, informal urban wear. Everyone was a newcomer, and the Jews were generally accepted with few signs of discrimination, according to Eisenberg, Kahn, and Toll (2009).

Though many Jewish immigrants to the West found success as merchants, others worked as bankers, miners, freighters, ranchers, and farmers. Otto Mears helped to build railroads across Colorado, while Solomon Bibo became the governor of the Acoma Pueblo Indians. Though these are by no means the only two Jewish immigrants to make names for themselves in the West, they help to showcase the wide variety of paths that Jewish settlers pursued. Organizations like the Hebrew Immigrant Aid Society and Baron Maurice de Hirsch's Jewish Agricultural Society served as a conduit for connecting Jewish newcomers arriving from Europe with settlements in the Upper Midwest, Southwest, and Far West. In other cases, family connections served as the primary network drawing more Jews to the West.

Jeanette Abrams argues persuasively that Jewish women played a prominent role in the establishment of Jewish communities throughout the West. For example, the first synagogue in Arizona, Tucson's Temple Emanu-El, was established by the local Hebrew Ladies Benevolent Society, as was the case for many synagogues in the West. Likewise, many Jewish activists and community leaders became prominent in municipal and state politics, winning election to public office with little attention paid to their Jewish identity. They set up Reform congregations and generally gave little support to Zionism down to the 1940s.

In the 20th century, Metropolitan Los Angeles became the second-largest Jewish base in the United States. The most dramatic cast of newcomers there was in Hollywood, where Jewish producers were the dominant force in the film industry after 1920.

== 1880–1925 ==
=== Immigration of Ashkenazi Jews ===
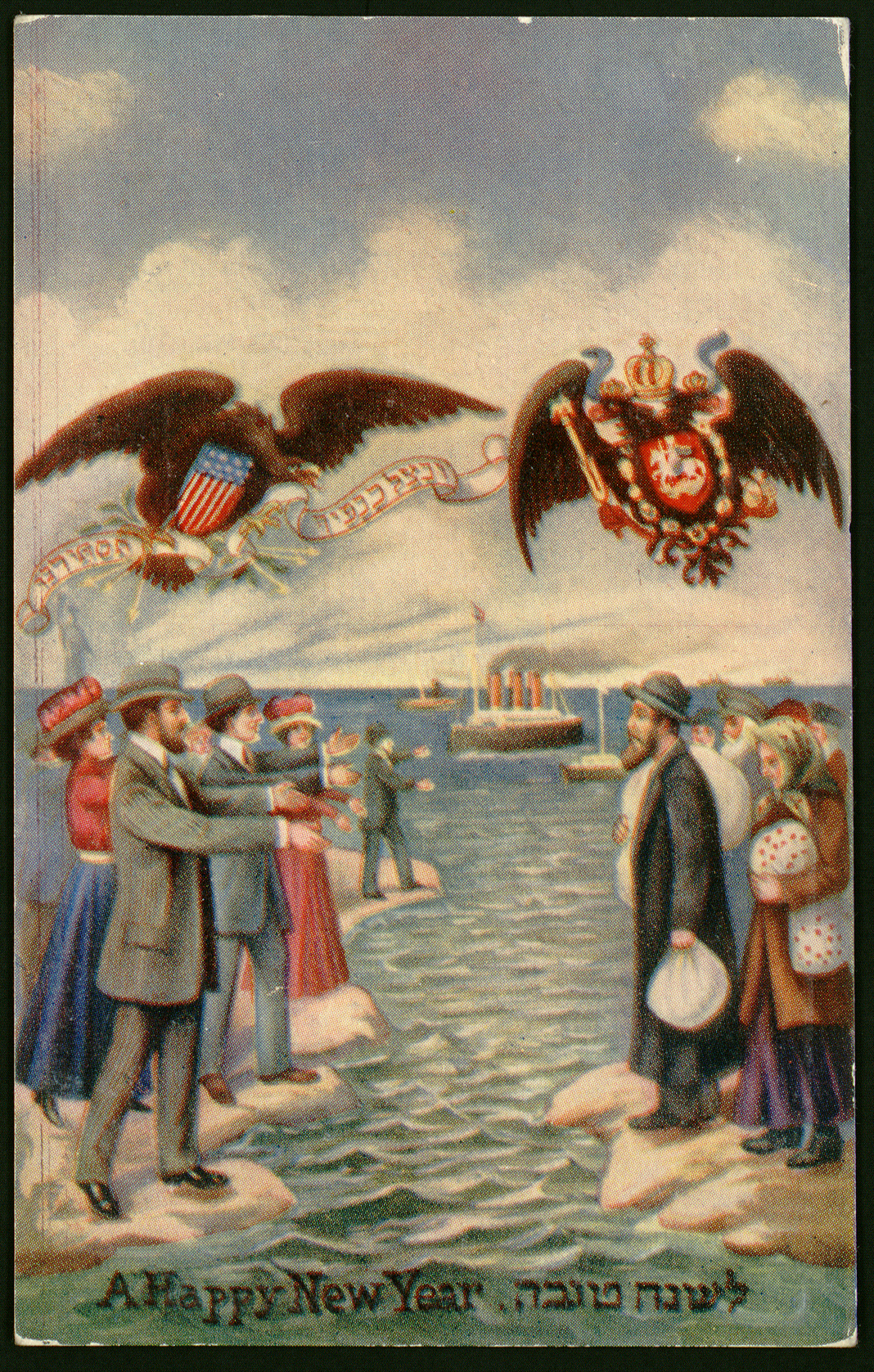
In this Rosh Hashanah greeting card from the early 20th century, Russian Jews, packs in hand, gaze at the American relatives beckoning them to the United States. Over two million Jews would flee the pogroms of the Russian Empire to the safety of the U.S. from 1881 to 1924.

None of the early migratory movements assumed the significance and volume of that from Russia and neighboring countries. Between the last two decades of the nineteenth century and the first quarter of the twentieth century, there was a mass emigration of Jewish peoples from Eastern and Southern Europe. During that period, 2.8 million European Jews immigrated to the United States, with 94% of them coming from Eastern Europe. This emigration, mainly from diaspora communities in Russian Poland and other areas of the Russian Empire, began as far back as 1821, but did not become especially noteworthy until after German immigration fell off in 1870. Though nearly 50,000 Russian, Polish, Galician, and Romanian Jews went to the United States during the succeeding decade, it was not until the pogroms, anti-Jewish riots in Russia, of the early 1880s, that the immigration assumed extraordinary proportions. From Russia alone the emigration rose from an annual average of 4,100 in the decade 1871–80 to an annual average of 20,700 in the decade 1881–90. Antisemitism and official measures of persecution over the past century combined with the desire for economic freedom and opportunity have motivated a continuing flow of Jewish immigrants from Russia and Central Europe over the past century.

The Russian pogroms, beginning in 1900, forced large numbers of Jews to seek refuge in the U.S. Though most of these immigrants arrived on the Eastern seaboard, many came as part of the Galveston Movement, through which Jewish immigrants settled in Texas as well as the western states and territories. In 1915, the circulation of the daily Yiddish newspapers was half a million in New York City alone, and 600,000 nationally. In addition, thousands more subscribed to the numerous weekly Yiddish papers and the many magazines. Yiddish theater was very well attended and provided a training ground for performers and producers who moved to Hollywood in the 1920s.

==== Response to the pogroms in the Russian Empire ====
The repeated occurrence of large-scale and murderous pogroms in the late 19th and early 20th centuries increasingly angered American public opinion. The well-established German Jews in the United States, although they were not directly affected by the Russian pogroms, were well organized and convinced Washington to support the cause of Jews in Russia. Led by Oscar Straus, Jacob Schiff, Mayer Sulzberger, and Rabbi Stephen Samuel Wise, they organized protest meetings, issued publicity, and met with President Theodore Roosevelt and Secretary of State John Hay. Stuart E. Knee reports that in April 1903, Roosevelt received 363 addresses, 107 letters, and 24 petitions signed by thousands of Christians leading public and church leaders—they all called on the Tsar to stop the persecution of Jews. Public rallies were held in scores of cities, topped off at Carnegie Hall in New York in May. The Tsar retreated a bit and fired one local official after the Kishinev pogrom, which Roosevelt explicitly denounced. But Roosevelt was mediating the war between Russia and Japan and could not publicly take sides. Therefore, Secretary Hay took the initiative in Washington. Finally Roosevelt forwarded a petition to the Tsar, who rejected it claiming the Jews were at fault. Roosevelt won Jewish support in his 1904 landslide reelection. The pogroms continued, as hundreds of thousands of Jews fled Russia, most heading for London or New York. With American public opinion turning against Russia, Congress officially denounced its policies in 1906. Roosevelt kept a low profile as did his new Secretary of State Elihu Root. In late 1906, Roosevelt appointed the first Jew to the cabinet: Oscar Straus, becoming Secretary of Commerce and Labor.

==== Restricting immigration from Eastern Europe – 1924-1965 ====
By 1924, 2 million Jews had arrived from Central and Eastern Europe. Anti-immigration feelings growing in the United States at this time resulted in the National Origins Quota of 1924, which severely restricted immigration from many regions, including Eastern Europe. The Jewish community took the lead in opposing immigration restrictions. In the 1930s they worked hard to allow in Jewish refugees from Nazi Germany. They had very little success; the restrictions remained in effect until 1965, although temporary opportunities were given to refugees from Europe after 1945.

== Local developments 1600s to 1900s ==
=== Chicago, Illinois ===
The first Jews to settle in Chicago after its 1833 incorporation were Ashkenazi. In the late 1830s and early 1840s German Jews arrived in Chicago, mostly from Bavaria. Many Jews in Chicago became street peddlers or eventually opened stores, some of which grew to larger companies. In the early 20th century, a wave of Ashkenazi Jews arrived, fleeing the pogroms in Eastern Europe.

=== Clarksburg, West Virginia ===
In 1900, five of seven clothing merchants in Clarksburg, West Virginia, were Jewish, and into the 1930s the Jews here were primarily merchants. Because of the need to expand their synagogue, the Orthodox Jewish congregation merged with a smaller Reform group to form a compromise Conservative congregation in 1939, and Jewish community life in Clarksburg centered on this synagogue. The community, which reached a population peak of about three hundred in the mid-1950s, is still represented by about thirty families.

=== Wichita, Kansas ===
The Jews of Wichita, Kansas, fashioned an ethnoreligious world that was distinct, vibrant, and tailored to their circumstances. They had migrated west with capital, credit, and know-how, and their family-based businesses were extensions of family businesses in the east. They distinguished themselves in educational, leadership, and civic positions. Predominantly German Jews through the 1880s, their remoteness and small numbers encouraged the practice of Reform Judaism. The arrival of conservative Jews from Eastern Europe after the 1880s brought tension into the Wichita Jewish community, but also stirred an ethnoreligious revival. The German Jews were well respected in the Wichita community, which facilitated the integration of the Eastern European newcomers. The Jewish community was characterized by a "dynamic tension" between tradition and modernization.

=== Oakland, California ===
The Jewish community in Oakland, California, is representative of many cities. Jews played a prominent role, and were among the pioneers of Oakland in the 1850s. In the early years, the Oakland Hebrew Benevolent Society, founded in 1862, was the religious, social, and charitable center of the community. The first synagogue, the First Hebrew Congregation of Oakland, was founded in 1875. The synagogue, also known as Temple Sinai, took over the religious and burial functions for the community. Jews from Poland predominated in the community, and most of them worked in some aspect of the clothing industry. David Solis-Cohen, the noted author, was a leader in the Oakland Jewish community in the 1870s. In 1879 Oakland's growing Jewish community organized a second congregation, a strictly orthodox group, Poel Zedek. Women's religious organizations flourished, their charitable services extending to needy gentiles as well as Jews. Oakland Jewry was part of the greater San Francisco community, yet maintained its own character. In 1881 the First Hebrew Congregation of Oakland, elected Myer Solomon Levy as its rabbi. The London-born Levy practiced traditional Judaism. Oakland's Jews were pushed hard to excel in school, both secular and religious. Fannie Bernstein was the first Jew to graduate from the University of California at Berkeley, in 1883. First Hebrew Congregation sponsored a Sabbath school which had 75 children in 1887. Oakland Jewry was active in public affairs and charitable projects in the 1880s. Rabbi Myer S. Levy was chaplain to the state legislature in 1885. The Daughters of Israel Relief Society continued its good works both inside and outside the Jewish community. Beth Jacob, the traditional congregation of Old World Polish Jews, continued its separate religious practices while it maintained friendly relations with the members of the first Hebrew Congregation. Able social and political leadership came from David Samuel Hirshberg. Until 1886 he was an officer in the Grand Lodge of B'nai B'rith. He served as Under Sheriff of Alameda County in 1883 and was active in Democratic party affairs. In 1885 he was appointed Chief Clerk of the U.S. Mint in San Francisco. As a politician, he had detractors who accused him of using his position in B'nai B'rith to foster his political career. When refugees from the fire-stricken, poorer Jewish quarter of San Francisco came to Oakland, the synagogue provided immediate aid. Food and clothing were given to the needy and 350 people were given a place to sleep. For about a week the synagogue fed up to 500 people three times a day. A large part of the expenses were paid by the Jewish Ladies' organization of the synagogue.

=== New Orleans, Louisiana ===
Because of the Code Noir, Jews were excluded from the French territory of Louisiana until 1803. Abraham Cohen Labatt, a Sephardic Jew from South Carolina, helped found the first Jewish congregation in Louisiana in the 1830s. Leon Godchaux, a Jewish immigrant from Lorraine, opened a clothing business in 1844. Isidore Newman established the Maison Blanche store on Canal Street. In 1870, the city's elite German Jews founded Temple Sinai, the first synagogue in New Orleans founded as a Reform congregation. Most Jews in New Orleans were loyal supporters of the Confederacy but Orthodox Eastern European Jews never outnumbered the Reform "German Uptown" Jews. Elizabeth D. A. Cohen was the first female physician in Louisiana. Leon C. Weiss became Governor Huey Long's favorite architect, and designed the new state capitol in Baton Rouge. After Hurricane Katrina in 2005, only about 70% of the city's pre-Katrina Jewish population had returned.

=== Maine ===
Jews have been living in Maine for 200 years, with significant Jewish communities in Bangor as early as the 1840s and in Portland since the 1880s. The arrival of Susman Abrams in 1785 was followed by a history of immigration and settlement that parallels the history of Jewish immigration to the United States. What initially brought people to these various towns around Maine was the promise of work, often linked with opportunities that supported Maine's shipbuilding, lumber and mill industries.

=== New York City, New York ===
In 1654, the first group of Jews came as refugees from Recife, Brazil to New Amsterdam, which became New York City. Over the years, Sephardic and Ashkenazi Jews continued to arrive, playing an important part in the city's history and cultural life. In the late 1800s and early 20th century, a wave of Ashkenazi Jews fleeing the pogroms in Eastern Europe came to the city, bringing New York's Jewish population to over 1 million in 1910, the world's largest Jewish population in any city at that time.

=== San Francisco, California ===
Jews formed a community in San Francisco during the California Gold Rush, 1848–55. Levi Strauss, founder of the first company to manufacture blue jeans (Levi Strauss & Co.), and Harvey Milk, LGBT rights activist and politician, were famous Jewish San Franciscans.

== Progressive movement ==
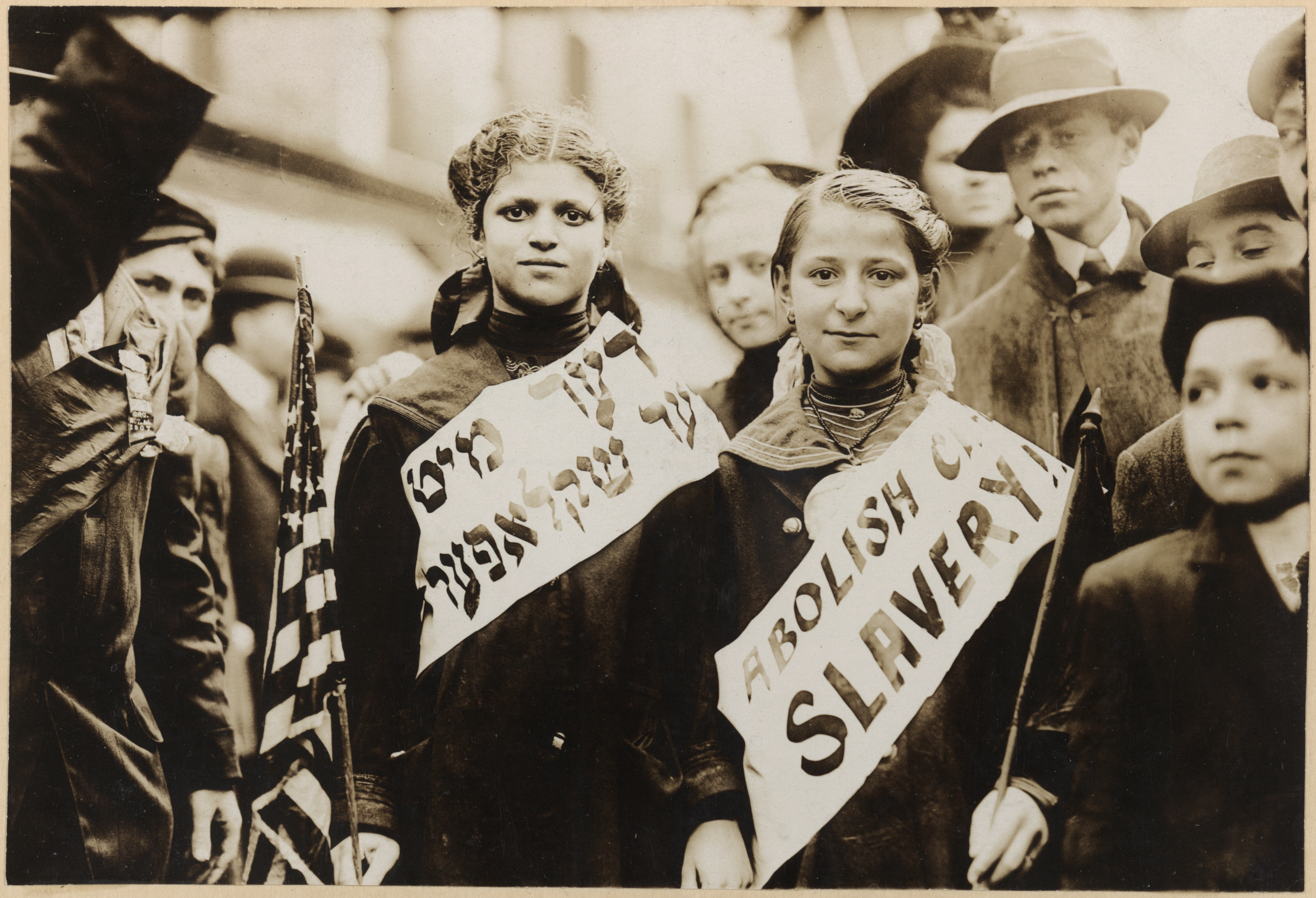
Half-length portrait of two girls wearing banners with slogan "ABOLISH CHILD SLAVERY!!" in English and Yiddish. Most likely taken during May 1, 1909 labor parade in New York City.

With the influx of Jews from Central and Eastern Europe many members of the Jewish community were attracted to labor and socialist movements and numerous Jewish newspapers such as Forwerts and Morgen Freiheit had a socialist orientation. Left wing organizations such as The Workmen's Circle and the Jewish People's Fraternal Order played an important part in Jewish community life until World War II.

Jewish Americans were not just involved in nearly every important social movement but in the forefront of promoting such issues as workers rights, civil rights, civil liberties, woman's rights, freedom of religion, peace movements, and various other progressive causes such as fighting prejudice.

== Americanization ==
The rapid assimilation into American culture of recent immigrants, dubbed Americanization, was a high priority for the established German Jews. Jacob Schiff played a major role. As a wealthy German Jew, Schiff shaped key decisions providing help to Eastern European Jews and fought against immigration restriction. A Reform Jew, he backed the creation of the Jewish Theological Seminary even though it was a Conservative project. He took a stand favoring a modified form of Zionism, reversing his earlier opposition. Above all, Schiff believed that American Jewry could live in both the Jewish and American worlds, creating a balance that made possible an enduring American Jewish community.

The National Council of Jewish Women (NCJW), founded in Chicago in 1893, promoted philanthropy and the Americanization of newly arrived Jewish women. Responding to the plight of Jewish women and girls from Eastern Europe, the NCJW created its Department of Immigrant Aid to assist their travels. The NCJW's Americanization program included assisting immigrants with housing, health, and employment problems, connecting them with organizations where women could begin to socialize, and conducting English classes while helping them maintain a strong Jewish identity. The council, pluralistic rather than conformist, continued its Americanization efforts and fought against restrictive immigration laws after World War I. At the forefront of its activities was the religious education of Jewish girls, who were ignored by the Orthodox community.

Jews faced many other factors encouraging their integration into American society. A big factor was the American public school system. When Jewish children arrived in America, they went to public schools that sought to integrate these children into America and the American cultural way of life. This was a culture shock and a very different experience for these children in school in America than their lives, and Jewish life as a whole, had been prior to immigration.

Philanthropy

Since the 1820s organized philanthropy has been a core value of the American Jewish community. In most cities the philanthropic organizations are the center of the Jewish community and activism is highly valued. Much of the money now goes to Israel, as well as hospitals and higher education; previously it went to poor Jews. This meant in the 1880-1930 era wealthy German Reform Jews were subsidizing poor Orthodox newcomers, and helping their process of Americanization, thus helping bridge the cultural gap. This convergence brought Jews into the political debates in the 1900-1930 period over immigration restriction. Jews were the leading opponents of restrictions, but could not stop their passage in 1924 or their use to keep out most refugees from Hitler in the 1930s.

Julius Rosenwald (1862–1932) moved to Chicago in the late 1880s. Purchasing a half-interest in 1895, he transformed a small mail order house Sears, Roebuck into the largest retailer in America. He used his wealth for philanthropy targeted especially at the plight of rural blacks in collaboration with Booker T. Washington. From 1917 to 1932 the Julius Rosenwald Foundation set up 5,357 public schools for blacks. He funded numerous hospitals for blacks in the South as well as 24 YMCA's; he was a major contributor to the NAACP and the National Urban League. His major contributions to the University of Chicago and to various Jewish philanthropies were on a similar grand scale. He spent $11 million to fund the Chicago Museum of Science and Industry.

== Lynching of Leo Frank ==
In 1913, a Jewish factory manager in Atlanta named Leo Frank was convicted of the murder of Mary Phagan, a 13-year-old Christian girl who was in his employ. Frank was sentenced to death. Today, the consensus of researchers is that Frank was wrongfully convicted.

In response to attacks on Jews, in October 1913, Sigmund Livingston founded the Anti-Defamation League (ADL) under the sponsorship of B'nai B'rith. The Leo Frank affair was mentioned by Adolf Kraus when he announced the creation of the ADL, but it was not the reason for the group's founding. The ADL became the leading Jewish group which fights against antisemitism in the United States.

In 1915, Georgia governor John Marshall Slaton, commuted Frank's death sentence to life imprisonment. As a result of public outrage over this legal action, a mob of prominent residents of Georgia kidnapped Frank, removed him from prison and lynched him.

On November 25, 1915, three months after Frank was lynched, a group of men who were led by William J. Simmons burned a cross on top of Stone Mountain, inaugurating a revival of the Ku Klux Klan. The event was attended by 15 charter members and a few aging survivors of the original Klan. The Klan disseminated the view that anarchists, communists and Jews were subverting American values and ideals.

== World War I ==
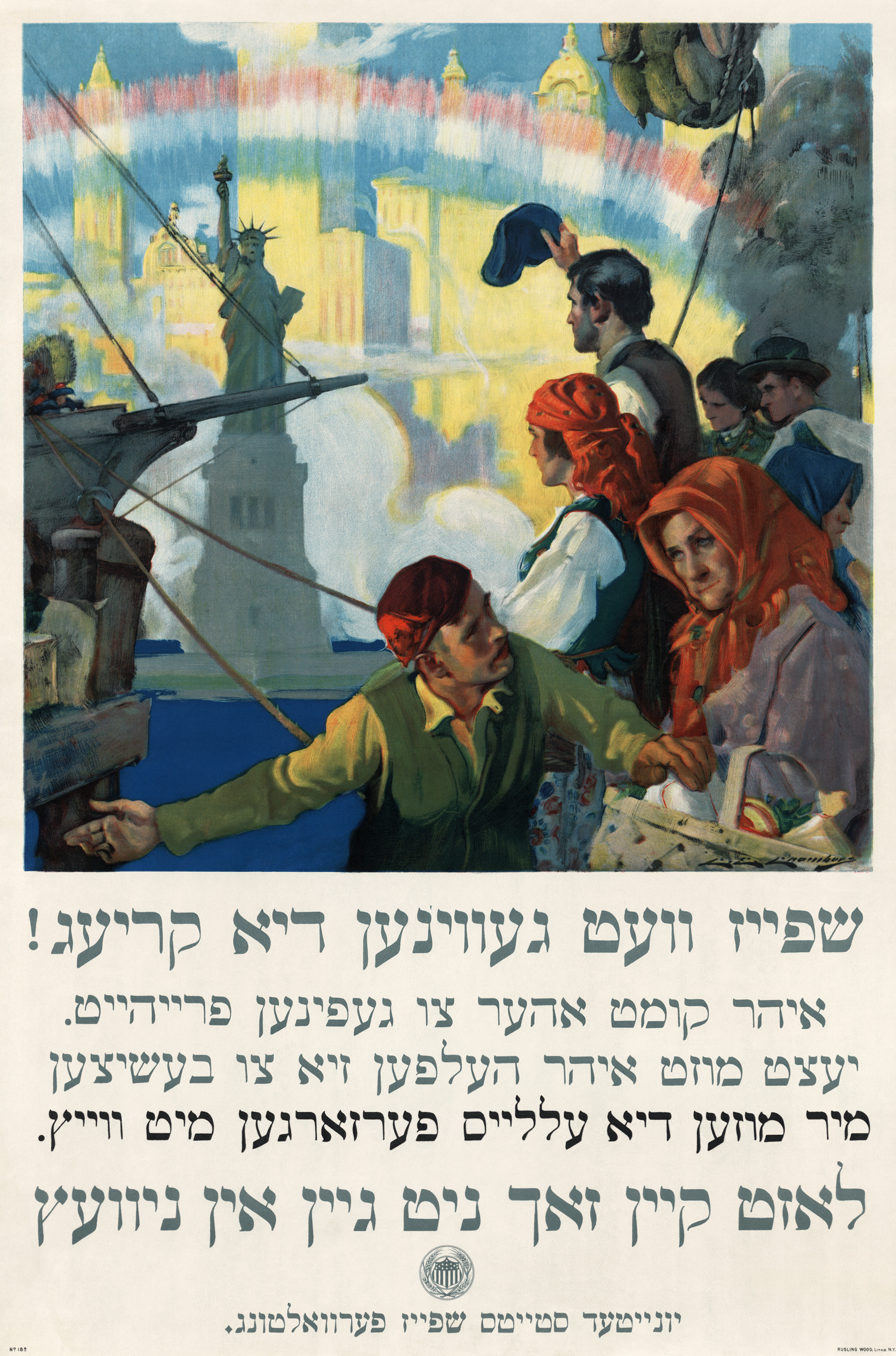
1917 World War I poster in Yiddish. Translation: "Food will win the war – You came here seeking freedom, now you must help to preserve it – Wheat is needed for the allies – waste nothing".

Jewish American sympathies likewise broke along ethnic lines, with recently arrived Yiddish speaking Jews leaning towards support of Zionism, and the established German-American Jewish community largely opposed to it. In 1914–1916, there were few Jewish voices in favor of American entry into the war. Many regarded the British government as hostile to Jewish interests. New York City, with its well-organized Jewish community numbering 1.5 million Jews, was the center of anti-war activism.

Of greatest concern to Jews was the tsarist regime in Russia because it was notorious for tolerating pogroms and issuing antisemitic policies. As historian Joseph Rappaport reported through his study of Yiddish press during the war, "The pro-Germanism of America's immigrant Jews was an inevitable consequence of their Russophobia". The fall of the tsarist regime in March 1917 removed a major obstacle for many Jews who refused to support tsarism. The draft went smoothly in New York City, and left-wing opposition to the war largely collapsed when Zionists saw the possibility of using the war to demand a state of Israel.

The number of Jews who served in the American military during World War I was disproportionate to their representation in the American population at large. The 250,000 Jews who served represented approximately 5% of the American armed forces whereas Jews only constituted 3% of the general population.

Starting in 1914, the American Jewish community mobilized its resources to assist the victims of the European war. Cooperating to a degree not previously seen, the various factions of the American Jewish community—native-born and immigrant, Reform, Orthodox, secular, and socialist—coalesced to form what eventually became known as the American Jewish Joint Distribution Committee. All told, American Jews raised $63 million in relief funds during the war years and became more immersed in European Jewish affairs than ever before.

== 1930s and World War II ==
While earlier Jewish elements from Germany were business oriented and voted as conservative Republicans, the wave of Eastern European Jews starting in the 1880s, were more liberal or left wing and became the political majority. Many came to America with experience in the socialist and anarchist movements as well as the Bund, based in Eastern Europe. Many Jews rose to leadership positions in the early 20th century American labor movement and helped to found unions in the "needle trades" (clothing industry) that played a major role in the CIO and in Democratic Party politics. Sidney Hillman of the CIO was especially powerful in the early 1940s at the national level. By the 1930s, Jews were a major political factor in New York City, with strong support for the most liberal programs of the New Deal. However their leaders were excluded from the Irish-controlled Tammany Hall, which was in full charge of the Democratic Party in New York City. Therefore, they worked through third parties, such as the American Labor Party and the Liberal Party of New York. By the 1940s they were inside the Democratic Party, and helped overthrow Tammany Hall. They continued as a major element of the New Deal coalition, giving special support to the Civil Rights Movement. By the mid-1960s, however, the Black Power movement caused a growing separation between blacks and Jews, though both groups remained solidly in the Democratic camp.

In Washington, 15% of FDR's appointees were Jewish, including top positions such as Secretary of the Treasury, Henry Morgenthau Jr. in 1933 and Supreme Court Justice Felix Frankfurter in 1939. Roosevelt's programs were not designed to overthrow capitalism as the left wanted, but instead created economic opportunities for working-class city people, especially Catholics and Jews in their roles as voters in a dominant New Deal coalition and as union members. Roosevelt's coalition was so delicate that he could not afford to let ethnic or racial tensions tear it apart. His deliberate policy (until Kristallnacht in 1938) was not to publicly criticize the atrocities developing in Nazi Germany, nor the domestic antisemitism typified by Catholic priest Charles Coughlin which blamed Jews for the Great Depression and the international crises in Europe. As a result of what Roosevelt did accomplish, "For liberal American Jews, the New Deal was a program worth fighting for even if it meant deferring concerns about the fate of German Jews." According to Henry Feingold, "It was the welfare-state aspect of the New Deal, rather than Roosevelt's foreign policy, which attracted the Jewish voter. The war and the holocaust tended to reinforce the left-wing political sentiments of many Jewish voters."

In the 1930s, increasing antisemitism in the United States (see History of Antisemitism in the United States) led to restrictions on Jewish American life from elite circles. Restrictions were mostly informal and affected Jewish presence in various universities, professions, and high-end housing communities. Many of the restrictions originated in the 1920s, but popularized and became more practiced throughout the 1930s and into the 1940s due to increasing antisemitic climate. In the East Coast, the Midwest, and the South, public and private universities imposed limits on the number of Jewish applicants they accepted, regardless of high scholastic standing. Harvard University believed that if it accepted students based only on merit, the student body would become majority Jewish, and for the same reason, the New Jersey College for Women (present-day Douglass College) only accepted 31% of Jewish applicants, versus 61% of all others. Similar patterns emerged among elite professions and communities. Law firms hired fewer Jewish lawyers, hospitals gave fewer patients to Jewish doctors, and universities hired fewer Jewish professors. Across the entire United States, only 100 Jewish American professors were employed in 1930. High-end housing communities across the United States, including the social clubs, resorts, and hotels within them, adhered to pacts that prevented Jewish Americans from buying homes and sleeping in rooms in their communities. These pacts limited high-end communities to American "gentiles".

=== Refugees from Nazi Germany ===
In the period between 1934 and 1943, the Congress, the Roosevelt Administration, and public opinion expressed concern about the fate of Jews in Europe but consistently refused to permit large-scale immigration of Jewish refugees. In a report issued by the State Department, Undersecretary of State Stuart Eizenstat noted that the United States accepted only 21,000 refugees from Europe and did not significantly raise or even fill its restrictive quotas, accepting far fewer Jews per capita than many of the neutral European countries and fewer in absolute terms than Switzerland.

According to David Wyman, "The United States and its Allies were willing to attempt almost nothing to save the Jews."

=== MS St. Louis ===
The SS St. Louis sailed from Germany in May 1939 carrying 936 (mainly German) Jewish refugees. On 4 June 1939, it was also refused permission to unload on orders of President Roosevelt as the ship waited in the Caribbean Sea between Florida and Cuba. Initially, Roosevelt showed limited willingness to take in some of those on board. But the Immigration Act of 1924 made that illegal and public opinion was strongly opposed. The ship returned to Europe. 620 of the passengers were eventually accepted in continental Europe, of these only 365 survived the Holocaust.

=== Restrictions on immigration ===
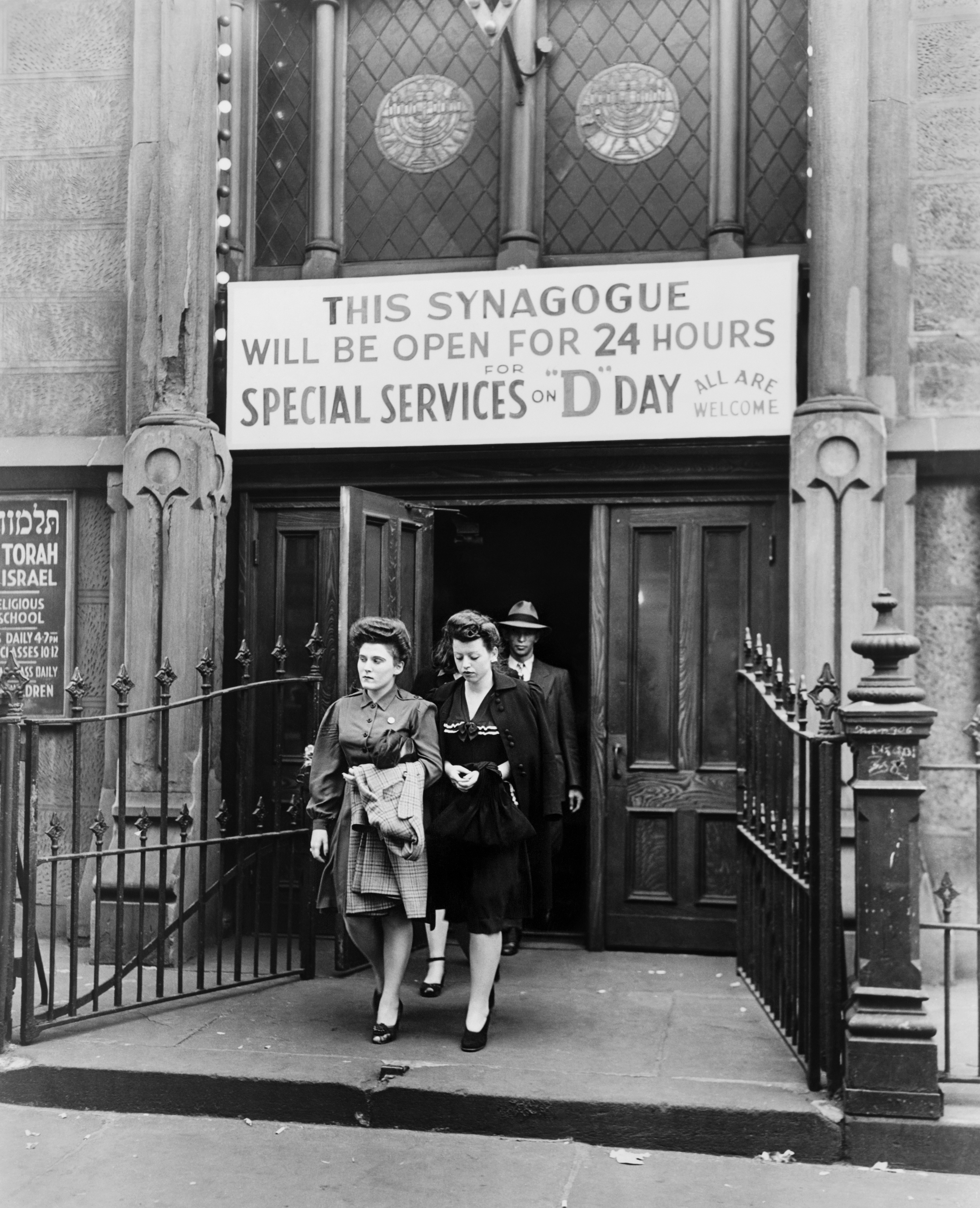
Synagogue Emunath Israel in New York City remained open 24 hours on D-Day for special services and prayer.

The United States' tight immigration policies were not lifted during the Holocaust, news of which began to reach the United States in 1941 and 1942 and it has been estimated that 190,000–200,000 Jews could have been saved during the Second World War had it not been for bureaucratic obstacles to immigration deliberately created by Breckinridge Long and others.

Asylum of the European Jewish population was not a priority for the U.S. during the war, and the American Jewish community did not realize the severity of the Holocaust until late in the conflict. This is in part because the Nazis did not allow Jews to leave Occupied Europe or Germany during this time.

=== American Jewish community's response to The Holocaust ===
During the World War II period, the American Jewish community was bitterly and deeply divided, and as a result, it was unable to form a common front. Most Eastern European Jews supported Zionism, which advocated a return to their ancestral homeland as the only solution to the Jewish question and the problem of antisemitism; this approach had the effect of diverting the American Jewish community's attention from the horrors which were occurring in Nazi Germany and German-occupied Europe. German Jews were alarmed by what the Nazis were doing to them but they were disdainful of Zionism. Proponents of the establishment of a Jewish state and the establishment of a Jewish army agitated, but many Jewish leaders were so fearful of an antisemitic backlash inside the U.S. that they demanded that all Jews keep a low public profile. One important development was the sudden conversion of most (but not all) Jewish leaders to Zionism late in the war.

The Holocaust was largely ignored by the American media while it was occurring. Why that was is illuminated by the anti-Zionist position taken by Arthur Hays Sulzberger, publisher of the New York Times, during World War II. Committed to classical Reform Judaism, which defined Judaism as a religious faith and not as a people, Sulzberger insisted that as an American he saw European Jews as part of a refugee problem, not separate from it. As publisher of the nation's most influential newspaper, The New York Times, he permitted only a handful of editorials during the war on the extermination of the Jews. He supported the anti-Zionist American Council for Judaism. Even after it became known that the Nazis had singled out the Jews for destruction, Sulzberger held that all refugees had suffered. He opposed the creation of Israel. In effect, he muted the enormous potential influence of the Times by keeping issues of concern regarding Jews off the editorial page and burying stories about Nazi atrocities against Jews in short items deep inside the paper. In time he grew increasingly out of step with the American Jewish community by his persistent refusal to recognize Jews as a people and despite obvious flaws in his view of American democracy.

While Jews owned few prestigious newspapers other than the New York Times, they had a major presence in Hollywood and in network radio. Hollywood films and radio with few exceptions avoided questioning Nazi persecution of Europe's Jews prior to Pearl Harbor. Jewish studio executives did not want to be accused of advocating Jewish propaganda by making films with overtly antifascist themes. Indeed, they were pressured by such organizations as the Anti-Defamation League and by national Jewish leaders to avoid such themes lest American Jews suffer an antisemitic backlash.

Despite strong public and political sentiment to the contrary, however, there were some who encouraged the U.S. government to help victims of Nazi genocide. In 1943, just before Yom Kippur, 400, mostly Orthodox, rabbis marched in Washington to draw attention to the plight of Holocaust victims. A week later, Senator William Warren Barbour (R; New Jersey), one of a handful of politicians who met with the rabbis on the steps of the U.S. Capitol, proposed legislation that would have allowed as many as 100,000 victims of the Holocaust to emigrate temporarily to the United States. Barbour died six weeks after introducing the bill, and it was not passed. A parallel bill was introduced in the House of Representatives by Rep. Samuel Dickstein (D; New York). This also failed to pass.

During the Holocaust, fewer than 30,000 Jews a year reached the United States, and some were turned away due to immigration policies. The U.S. did not change its immigration policies until 1948.

As of 2021, laws requiring teaching of the Holocaust are on the books in 16 U.S. states.

==== Impact ====
The Holocaust had a profound impact on the community in the United States, especially after 1960, as Jews tried to comprehend what had happened, and especially to commemorate and grapple with it when looking to the future. Abraham Joshua Heschel summarized this dilemma when he attempted to understand Auschwitz: "To try to answer is to commit a supreme blasphemy. Israel enables us to bear the agony of Auschwitz without radical despair, to sense a ray [of] God's radiance in the jungles of history."

== Postwar era ==
500,000 American Jews (or half of the eligible men) fought in World War II, and after the war, younger families participated in the new trend of suburbanization. There, Jews increasingly became assimilated and as a result, there was an increase in the number of intermarriages between Jews and non-Jews. The suburbs facilitated the formation of new centers, as Jewish school enrollment more than doubled between the end of World War II and the mid-1950s, and synagogue affiliation jumped from 20% in 1930 to 60% in 1960; the fastest growth came in Reform and, especially, Conservative congregations.

Because it was never subjected to the Holocaust, the United States stood as the home of the largest, richest, and healthiest center of Judaism in the world after the Second World War. Smaller Jewish communities increasingly turned to American Jewry for guidance and support.

Immediately after the Second World War, some Jewish refugees resettled in the United States, and another wave of Jewish refugees from Arab nations settled in the U.S. after their expulsion from their home countries.

=== Politics ===
American Jews voted 90% against the Republicans in support of Democrats Franklin D. Roosevelt and Harry S. Truman in the elections of 1940, 1944 and 1948, despite both party platforms supporting the creation of a Jewish state in the latter two elections. During the 1952 and 1956 elections, they voted 60% or more for Democrat Adlai Stevenson, while General Eisenhower garnered 40% for his reelection; the best showing to date for the Republicans since Harding's 43% in 1920. In 1960, 83% voted for Democrat John F. Kennedy, a Catholic, against Richard Nixon, and in 1964, 90% of American Jews voted for Lyndon Johnson; his Republican opponent, Barry Goldwater, was raised Episcopalian but his paternal grandparents were Jewish. Hubert Humphrey garnered 81% of the Jewish vote in the 1968 elections, in his losing bid for president against Richard Nixon; such a high level of Jewish support has not been seen since.

During the Nixon re-election campaign of 1972, Jewish voters were apprehensive about George McGovern and only favored the Democrat by 65%, while Nixon more than doubled Republican Jewish support to 35%. In the election of 1976, Jewish voters supported Democrat Jimmy Carter by 71% over incumbent president Gerald Ford's 27%, but in 1980 they abandoned Carter, leaving him with only 45% support, while Republican winner, Ronald Reagan, garnered 39%, and 14% went to independent John Anderson.

During the Reagan re-election campaign of 1984, the Jews returned home to the Democratic Party, giving Reagan only 31% compared to 67% for Democrat Walter Mondale. The same 2–1 pattern reappeared in 1988 as Democrat Michael Dukakis had 64%, while victorious George Bush polled 35%. Bush's Jewish support collapsed during his re-election in 1992, to just 11%, with 80% voting for Bill Clinton and 9% going to independent Ross Perot. Clinton's re-election campaign in 1996 maintained high Jewish support at 78%, with 16% supporting Bob Dole and 3% supporting Perot.

In the 2000 US Presidential Election, Connecticut Senator Joe Lieberman, was chosen by Al Gore to be his running mate and the vice presidential candidate for the Democratic Party, marking the first time in history that a practicing Jew was included on a major party's presidential ticket.

Bernie Sanders won the New Hampshire Democratic primary on February 9, 2016, by 22.4% of the vote (60.4% to Hillary Clinton's 38.0%); he received strong support from voters who considered it important to nominate a candidate who is "honest and trustworthy." This made him the first Jewish American to win a U.S. presidential primary.(Barry Goldwater, the 1964 Republican presidential nominee, was the first winner of Jewish heritage, but was a Christian).

=== Suburbanization ===
In the years following World War II, American Jews enjoyed significant upward socio-economic mobility, in large part due to increased acceptance within the white mainstream. This shift enabled access to federal programs such as the GI Bill, which provided low-interest mortgages and facilitated home purchases in white-only suburbs along the Northeast corridor. Jewish families moved rapidly from crowded urban neighborhoods to more spacious suburbs, with Jewish suburbanization outpacing that of the general population. The decline in institutionalized antisemitism also expanded Jewish access to elite universities and professions, further solidifying their status as white Americans.

However, integration into white suburban communities fundamentally changed Jewish communal and religious life. Jews were expected to assimilate alongside their non-Jewish neighbors and minimize visible differences to be regarded as "good neighbors". As a result, public expressions of Judaism common in urban areas, such as walkable synagogues, traditional dress, kosher delis, and Yiddish signage, became less present. This meant that Judaism and Yiddish culture could no longer be absorbed passively from the environment. In response, suburban Jews built community centers and Hebrew schools and increased synagogue affiliation to counter assimilation pressures. Many now had to actively seek out Jewish life in private spaces, separate from their workplaces or schools.

Suburbanization also encouraged the growth of diverse religious movements, including modern Orthodox, Conservative, and Reform Judaism. Before the war, Jews were often confined to tightly knit urban ghettos in places like Williamsburg and Crown Heights, reminiscent of their European past. Increased interaction with their gentile neighbors meant that many Jews were no longer forced to choose between remaining within this insular religious community and the largely secular lifestyle outside of it. For example, Orthodox Jews wearing kippot and commuting from the suburbs to jobs in New York's financial district became a common sight, demonstrating that religious and professional identities could coexist. Conservative synagogues built large parking lots for congregants who drove on Shabbat and holidays, while Reform synagogues added social halls to support community events and emphasize cultural aspects of Judaism. Although suburbanization brought security, prosperity, and civic inclusion, it also raised concerns about assimilation, increased intermarriage, and the loss of Jewish tradition and distinctiveness. These issues continue to influence debates over American Jewish life and identity today.

=== Exceptionalism ===
Historians believe American Jewish history has been characterized by an unparalleled degree of freedom, acceptance, and prosperity that has made it possible for Jews to bring together their ethnic identities with the demands of national citizenship far more effortlessly than Jews in Europe. American Jewish exceptionalism differentiates Jews from other American ethnic groups by means of educational and economic attainments and, indeed, by virtue of Jewish values, including a devotion to political liberalism. Historian Marc Dollinger has found that for the last century the most secular Jews have tended toward the most liberal or even leftist political views, while more religious Jews are politically more conservative. Modern Orthodox Jews have been less active in political movements than Reform Jews. They vote Republican more often than less traditional Jews. In contemporary political debate, strong Orthodox support for various school voucher initiatives undermines the exceptionalist belief that the Jewish community seeks a high and impenetrable barrier between church and state.

Most of the discussions of American Exceptionalism refer to the nation as a whole. However, there have been discussions of how American Exceptionalism has applied to specific subgroups, especially minorities. Scholars comparing the record of persecution of Jews in Europe and the Middle East with the highly favorable circumstances in the United States, debate to what extent the American treatment of Jews has been unique in world history, and how much it has become a model of pluralism at least in regards to this group.

=== Creation of the State of Israel ===
In the decades immediately preceding the creation of the State of Israel in 1948, immigrant American Jews were fiercely divided along ideological schisms like socialism vs. capitalism, strict secularism vs. religiosity. Yet, the horrors of the Holocaust and the subsequent establishment of the Jewish state helped to smooth out these internal divides, creating a new baseline consensus. The majority of American Jews, whether previously socialist, Zionist, or even apolitical, could unite in supporting the infant state's survival and combating antisemitism. Moreover, Israel became the focal point of American Jewish life and philanthropy, as well as the symbol around which American Jews united. For instance, since 1999, programs like Birthright Israel have helped foster the connection between American Jews and Israel by offering a free trip to nearly 1 million young Jews, 70–80% of them from the United States.

=== Six-Day War ===
The Six-Day War of June 1967 marked a turning point in the lives of many 1960s-era Jews. The paralyzing fear of a "second Holocaust" followed by tiny Israel's seemingly miraculous victory over the combined Arab armies arrayed to destroy it struck deep emotional chords among American Jews. Their financial support for Israel rose sharply in the war's wake, and more of them than ever before chose in those years to make Israel their permanent home.

A lively internal debate commenced, following the Six-Day War. The American Jewish community was divided over whether they agreed with the Israeli response; the great majority came to accept the war as necessary. A tension existed especially for leftist Jews, between their liberal ideology and Zionist backing in the midst of this conflict. This deliberation about the Six-Day War showed the depth and complexity of Jewish responses to the varied events of the 1960s.

=== Civil rights movement ===
Jews proved to be strong supporters of the American civil rights movement. Jews were highly visible as leaders of movements for civil rights for all Americans, including themselves and African Americans. Seymour Siegel argues that the Jewish people's historic struggle against prejudice inspired many Jews to sympathize with all people who were confronting discrimination. This inspiration also led Jews to discuss the relationship which they had with African Americans. Jewish leaders spoke at the two iconic marches of the era. Joachim Prinz, president of the American Jewish Congress, appeared at the March on Washington on 28 August 1963, stating that "As Jews we bring to this great demonstration, in which thousands of us proudly participate, a twofold experience—one of the spirit and one of our history." Two years later Abraham Joshua Heschel of the Jewish Theological Seminary marched in the front row of the Selma-to-Montgomery march.

Within Judaism, increasing involvement in the civil rights movement caused some tensions. Rabbi Bernard Wienberger exemplified this point of view, warning that "northern liberal Jews" put at risk southern Jews who faced hostility from white southerners because of their northern counterparts. However, most known Jewish responses to the civil rights movement and black relations lean toward acceptance and against prejudice, as the disproportionate involvement of Jews in the movement would indicate. Despite this history of participation, relations between African Americans and Jews have sometimes been strained by their close proximity and class differences, especially in New York and other urban areas.

=== Jewish feminism ===
In its modern form, the origin of the Jewish feminist movement can be traced back to the United States in the early 1970s. According to Judith Plaskow, who has focused on feminism in Reform Judaism, the main issues for early Jewish feminists in these movements were the exclusion from the all-male prayer group or minyan, the exemption from positive time-bound mitzvot, and women's inability to function as witnesses, and to initiate divorce. Sally Priesand was ordained by the Hebrew Union College-Jewish Institute of Religion on June 3, 1972, at the Plum Street Temple in Cincinnati, thus becoming America's first female rabbi ordained by a rabbinical seminary, and the second formally ordained female rabbi in Jewish history, after Regina Jonas.

=== Immigration from the Soviet Union ===
The last large wave of Jewish immigrants came from the Soviet Union after 1988, in response to heavy political pressure from the U.S. government. After the 1967 Six-Day War and after the tide of liberalization in Eastern Europe in 1968, the Soviet government's policies became more restrictive. Jews were denied educational and vocational opportunities. These restrictive policies led to the emergence of a new political group—the 'refuseniks'—whose main goal was emigration. The refuseniks (Jews who were denied exit visas) attracted the attention of the West, particularly the attention of the United States, and as a result, they became an important factor which influenced economic and trade relations between the United States and the Soviet Union. The 1975 Jackson Amendment to the Trade Reform Act linked the granting of 'most favored nation' status to the USSR to the liberalization of Soviet emigration laws.

Beginning in 1967, the Soviet Union allowed some Jewish citizens to leave for family reunifications in Israel. Due to the break in diplomatic relations between Israel and the USSR, most émigrés traveled to Vienna, Austria or Budapest, Hungary, from there, they were flown to Israel. After 1976, the majority of the émigrés who left for Israel with visas 'dropped out' in Vienna and chose to resettle in the West. Several American Jewish organizations helped them obtain visas and they also aided their resettlement in the United States and other countries. However, Israel wanted them and it tried to prevent Soviet Jewish émigrés from resettling in the United States after they had intended to immigrate to Israel. Israeli officials pressured American Jewish organizations to desist from aiding Russian Jews who wanted to resettle in the United States. Initially, American Jews resisted Israeli efforts. Following Mikhail Gorbachev's decision to legalize the free emigration of Soviet Jews in the late 1980s, the American Jewish community accepted a quota on the number of Soviet Jewish refugees who were allowed to settle in the U.S., which resulted in most Soviet Jewish émigrés settling in Israel.

The Russian Jewish population of the United States is the second largest Russian Jewish population in the world, its size is only surpassed by the size of the Russian Jewish population of Israel. According to RINA, there is a core Russian-Jewish population of 350,000 in the U.S. The enlarged Russian Jewish population in the U.S. is estimated to be 700,000. Some 100,000 Ashkenazi and Bukharian Jews emigrated to the United States. Large pockets of Russian-Jewish Communities include Brooklyn, New York, specifically Brighton Beach and Sheepshead Bay, and in the Sunny Isles Beach neighborhood of South Florida. Another large pocket of Russian Jewish residence is Northeast Philadelphia and surrounding Bucks and Montgomery Counties, as well as Northern New Jersey.

== Local developments in the 20th and 21st centuries ==
=== Nashville, Tennessee ===
Reform Jews, predominantly German, became Nashville's largest and most influential Jewish community in the first half of the 20th century; they enjoyed good relations with the Orthodox and Conservative congregations. Some German Jewish refugees resettled in Nashville from 1935 to 1939, helped by prominent Nashville families. Both the Orthodox and Conservative congregations had relocated their synagogues to the suburbs by 1949, and the entire Jewish community had shifted southwest by about five miles. Although subtle social discrimination existed, Nashville's Jews enjoyed the respect of the larger community. Public acceptance, however, required complicity in racial segregation. The Observer, Nashville's Jewish newspaper, tried to find a middle ground between assimilation and particularism, but after years of calling for group solidarity, accepted that the Jewish community was pluralistic.

=== Palm Springs, California ===
About 20,000 Jews reside in the Palm Springs area. The world-famous desert resort community has been widely known for its Hollywood celebrities. Philadelphia publisher Walter Annenberg opened the Tamarisk Country Club in 1946, after being refused membership in the Los Angeles Lakeside country club. But his connections with Hollywood and corporations alike made his country club a success, and made it a policy to allow Jews and all people, regardless of race and religion, to have access to his facility.

Many elderly American Jews from the East coast and the Los Angeles metropolitan area come to retire in the warm climates such as the Coachella Valley, favoring golf course and mobile home communities. By the 1990s they were a large component of demography in the desert resort. There are 12 Jewish places of worship, including a Jewish community center in Palm Desert, where an estimated 20–25 percent of the population are of Jewish descent.

Palm Springs has the annual "Winter Festival of Lights" parade, which began as a separate parade to celebrate Chanukah in the 1960s. Over time, that and the Christmas-themed parade merged into the one celebrating the season's lights of menorahs, Christmas trees and the calendar new year.

=== Miami ===
After 1945, many northeastern Jews moved to Florida, especially to Miami, Miami Beach, and nearby cities. They found familiar foods and better weather, and founded more open, less tradition-bound communities, where greater materialism and more leisure-oriented, less disciplined Judaism developed. Many relaxed their religiosity and attended services only during Rosh Hashana and Yom Kippur. In South Florida synagogue affiliation, Jewish community center membership, and per capita contributions to the United Jewish Appeal and the Jewish Federation are among the lowest of any Jewish community in the United States.

=== Princeton, New Jersey ===
The development of Jewish (particularly Orthodox) student life at Princeton University improved rapidly since the end of World War II, when Jewish students were few and isolated. In 1958 Jewish students were more numerous; they protested against the Bicker system of eating club member selection. In 1961 Yavneh House was established as Princeton's first kosher kitchen. In 1971 Stevenson Hall opened as a university-managed kosher eating facility in the midst of the older private eating clubs. Jewish student initiative and Princeton administration openness deserve credit for this progress.

=== Beverly Hills, California ===
An estimated 20–25 percent of the population of this affluent Los Angeles suburb is Jewish, and about 20 percent is Persian. About a quarter of the membership of Sinai Temple, a prominent synagogue in nearby Westwood, is Persian Jews who largely came to the United States in the aftermath of the Islamic Revolution in Iran.

=== New York City ===
As of 2016, New York state has an estimated Jewish population of about 1.8 million; of these 1.1 million live in New York City.

== Rise to affluence in the 20th century ==
In 1983, economist Thomas Sowell of Stanford University wrote "Jewish family incomes are the highest of any large ethnic group in the US—72% above the national average." Sowell points out that Episcopalians have also experienced similar prosperity—as a group—as Jews, but it is the "social and economic distance covered in a relatively short time" that makes the Jewish experience in America unique.

Gerald Krefetz discusses the prosperity that Jews earned in the United States following their emigration from Europe in the 19th and 20th centuries, and he attributes their success to their familiarity with "trading and exchanging, commerce, city living, property rights... and accumulation of funds for future investment."

Historian Edward S. Shapiro cites a Forbes magazine survey from the 1980s, which showed that, of the 400 richest Americans, over 100 were Jewish, which was nine times greater than would be expected based on the overall population. Shapiro also estimates that over 30% of American billionaires are Jewish, and he cites a 1986 issue of Financial World that listed the top 100 money makers in 1985, and "half the people mentioned" were Jewish, including George Soros, Asher Edelman, Michael Milken, and Ivan Boesky.

Until the mid-1960s, very few Jewish lawyers were hired by White Anglo-Saxon Protestant (WASP), white-shoe law firms, leading to the formation of Jewish-owned firms. WASP-led law firms typically followed a tradition of discriminatory hiring practices, leading to the development of Jewish-owned law firms in New York City. In 1950, there were no large Jewish law firms; by 1965, six were counted among the 20 largest firms; by 1980, four of the 10 largest law firms in New York City were Jewish-owned.

WASP dominance in law ended when a number of major Jewish law firms attained elite status in dealing with top-ranked corporations. By the 1990s Jews were becoming prominent in Congress and state governments throughout the country.

== Current situation ==
Historical population
Year	Pop.	±%
1790	1,500	—
1800	2,250	+50.0%
1810	2,625	+16.7%
1820	3,000	+14.3%
1830	6,000	+100.0%
1840	15,000	+150.0%
1850	50,000	+233.3%
1860	150,000	+200.0%
1870	200,000	+33.3%
1880	250,000	+25.0%
1890	400,000	+60.0%
1900	1,500,000	+275.0%
1910	1,777,000	+18.5%
1920	3,389,000	+90.7%
1930	4,228,000	+24.8%
1940	4,771,000	+12.8%
1950	5,000,000	+4.8%
1960	5,300,000	+6.0%
1970	5,400,000	+1.9%
1980	5,500,000	+1.9%
1990	5,515,000	+0.3%
2000	5,532,000	+0.3%
2010	5,425,000	−1.9%

Core Jewish population as a % of the total U.S. population since 1790:
Year	% Jewish
1790	0.04%
1800	0.04%
1810	0.04%
1820	0.03%
1830	0.05%
1840	0.09%
1850	0.22%
1860	0.48%
1870	0.52%
1880	0.51%
1890	0.64%
1900	1.39%
1910	1.93%
1920	3.20%
1930	3.43%
1940	3.61%
1950	3.30%
1960	2.99%
1970	2.89%
1980	2.51%
1990	2.22%
2000	1.97%
2010	1.76%

Note: These charts are for the U.S. core Jewish population only. 1810 is an extrapolation as figures are not available for this exact year.

Jewish population today tends to be concentrated in larger cities, Florida, and the states of the Northeast.

American Jews continued to prosper throughout the early 21st century. According to a 2016 study by the Pew Research Center, Jewish ranked as the most financially successful religious group in the United States, with 44% of Jews living in households with incomes of at least $100,000, followed by Hindu (36%), Episcopalians (35%), and Presbyterians (32%), though owing to their numbers, more Catholics (13.3 million) reside in households with a yearly income of $100,000 or more than any other religious group. The 2021 Forbes 400 includes several Jews among the top 10 wealthiest Americans: Mark Zuckerberg, Larry Page, Sergey Brin, Larry Ellison, Steve Ballmer, and Michael Bloomberg. American Jews are disproportionately represented in business, academia and politics. Thirty percent of American Nobel prize winners in science and 37 percent of all American Nobel winners are Jewish.

However, a 2007 study found that 15% of American Jews live below the poverty line; the 2016 Pew study found that number to be 16%. A 2019 study found 20% of American Jews to be in or near poverty, with 45% of Jewish children living in poor or near-poor households. The percentage of Jews at Ivy League Universities has dropped steadily in the past decade.

Demographically, the population is not increasing. With their success, American Jews have become increasingly assimilated into American culture, with high intermarriage rates resulting in either a falling or steady population rate at a time when the country was booming. It has not grown appreciably since 1960, comprises a smaller percentage of America's total population than it had in 1910, and seems likely to witness an actual decline in numbers in the decades ahead.

Jews also began to move to the suburbs, with major population shifts from New York and the Northeast to Florida and California. New Jewish organizations were founded to accommodate an increasing range of Jewish worship and community activities, as well as geographic dispersal.

Politically, the Jewish population remained strongly liberal. The heavily Democratic pattern continued into the 21st century. Since 1936 the great majority of Jews have been Democrats. In 2004 74% of Jews voted for Democrat John Kerry, a Catholic of partial Jewish descent, and in 2006 87% voted for Democratic candidates for the House.

=== Self identity ===
Social historians analyze the American population in terms of class, race, ethnicity, religion, gender, region and urbanism. Jewish scholars generally emphasize ethnicity. First, it reflects the suppression of the term "Jewish race," a contested but fairly common usage right into the 1930s and its replacement by the more acceptable "ethnic" usage. Second, it reflects a post-religious evaluation of American Jewish identity, in which "Jewishness" (rather than "Judaism") is taken to be more inclusive, embracing the secularized as well as the religious experiences of Jews.

Korelitz (1996) shows how American Jews during the late 19th and early 20th centuries abandoned a racial definition of Jewishness in favor of one that embraced ethnicity and culture. The key to understanding this transition from a racial self-definition to a cultural or ethnic one can be found in the Menorah Journal between 1915 and 1925. During this time contributors to the Menorah promoted a cultural, rather than a racial, religious, or other view of Jewishness as a means to define Jews in a world that threatened to overwhelm and absorb Jewish uniqueness. The journal represented the ideals of the menorah movement established by Horace Kallen and others to promote a revival in Jewish cultural identity and combat the idea of race as a means to define or identify peoples.

Siporin (1990) uses the family folklore of "ethnic" Jews to their collective history and its transformation into an historical art form. They tell us how Jews have survived being uprooted and transformed. Many immigrant narratives bear a theme of the arbitrary nature of fate and the reduced state of immigrants in a new culture. By contrast, ethnic family narratives tend to show the ethnic more in charge of his life, and perhaps in danger of losing his Jewishness altogether. Some stories show how a family member successfully negotiated the conflict between ethnic and American identities.

After 1960 memories of the Holocaust, together with the Six-Day War in 1967 that resulted in the survival of Israel had major impacts on fashioning Jewish ethnic identity. The Shoah provided Jews with a rationale for their ethnic distinction at a time when other minorities were asserting their own.

== Antisemitism in the United States ==
During the Civil War, General Ulysses S. Grant issued an order (quickly rescinded by President Abraham Lincoln) of expulsion against Jews from the portions of Tennessee, Kentucky and Mississippi which were under his control. (See General Order No. 11)

Antisemitism continued to be widespread in the United States into the first half of the 20th century. Jews were discriminated against in some fields of employment, they were not allowed to join some social clubs and they were also not allowed to stay in some resort areas, their enrollment at colleges was limited by quotas, and they were also not allowed to buy certain properties. In response, Jews established their own country clubs, summer resorts, and universities, such as Brandeis.

Antisemitism in America reached its peak during the interwar period. The rise of the second Ku Klux Klan in the 1920s, the antisemitic works of Henry Ford, and the radio speeches of Father Coughlin in the late 1930s indicated the intensity of attacks on the Jewish community.

Antisemitism in the United States has rarely erupted into physical violence against Jews. Some notable cases in which acts of violence were committed against Jews in the United States include the attack on the funeral procession of Rabbi Jacob Joseph by Irish workers and police in New York City in 1902, the lynching of Leo Frank in 1915, the murder of Alan Berg in 1984, and the Crown Heights riot of 1991.

Following the Second World War and the American Civil Rights Movement, anti-Jewish sentiment waned. However, some members of the Nation of Islam and some members of other Black Nationalist organizations accused Jews of exploiting black laborers, bringing alcohol and drugs into black communities, and unfairly dominating the economy. Furthermore, according to annual surveys which have been conducted by the Anti-Defamation League since 1964, a Jewish organization, African Americans are significantly more likely to hold antisemitic beliefs than white Americans are, but among members of all races, there is a strong correlation between a person's level of education and his or her rejection of antisemitic stereotypes. However, black Americans of all education levels are significantly more likely to be antisemitic than whites who are of the same education level. In the 1998 survey, blacks (34%) were nearly four times more likely (9%) to fall into the most antisemitic category (those who agreed with at least 6 out of 11 statements that were potentially or clearly antisemitic) than whites were. Among blacks with no college education, 43% of them fell into the most antisemitic group (vs. 18% of the general population), which fell to 27% among blacks with some college education, and 18% among blacks with a four-year college degree (vs. 5% of the general population).

The 2005 Anti-Defamation League survey includes data on the attitudes of Hispanics, with 29% of Hispanics being the most antisemitic (vs. 9% of whites and 36% of blacks); being born in the United States helped alleviate this attitude: 35% of foreign-born Hispanics were antisemitic, but only 19% of those Hispanics who were born in the U.S. were antisemitic.

As an example of religious tensions, in 2010, a widespread debate erupted over the building of an Islamic cultural center and a mosque in New York City near the World Trade Center site. The city of New York has officially endorsed the project, but nationwide, public opinion has been hostile. A Time poll of 1000 individuals which was conducted in August 2010 indicated that only 13 percent of Americans have unfavorable views of Jews, by contrast, the same pole indicated that 43 percent of Americans have unfavorable views of Muslims, however, only 17 percent of Americans have unfavorable views of Catholics and only 29 percent of Americans have unfavorable views of Mormons according to the pole. By contrast, antisemitic attitudes are much higher in Europe and they are growing.

A July 2013 report which was published by the Anti-Defamation League indicated that there had been a 14 percent decline in the number of recorded antisemitic incidents across the United States. The audit of the 2012 records identified 17 physical assaults, 470 cases of harassment or threat, and 440 cases of vandalism in which the target was Jewish and the alleged motive was hatred.

In April 2014, the Anti-Defamation League published its 2013 audit of antisemitic incidents. According to the audit, the number of recorded antisemitic incidents had declined by 19 percent in 2013. The total number of antisemitic attacks which had occurred across the U.S. in 2013 was 751, including 31 physical assaults, 315 incidents of vandalism and 405 cases of harassment.

In the first few months of 2014, at least two antisemitic incidents of swastika drawings on Jewish belongings occurred in universities. On April 1, Frazier Glenn Miller Jr., a former member of the Ku Klux Klan, arrived at the Jewish center of Kansas City and murdered three people, none of whom were Jewish and two of whom were on their way to a church. After his capture, the suspect was heard saying "Heil Hitler". Later that month, a sprayed swastika was found in Price Hill, Cincinnati, on the door of a Jewish family's house. In May 2014, the Vassar Students for Justice in Palestine published a Nazi World War II propaganda poster. The poster displays Jews as part of a monster who tries to destroy the world. Vassar college president Catharine Hill denounced the antisemitic post.

As a result of operation Protective Edge, there were more antisemitic attacks during July. Some of the attacks were directly connected to the operation, such as graffiti paintings of swastika and the word "Hamas" outside a synagogue in South Florida.

Another antisemitic trend which is spreading across the country is the republication of antisemitic leaflets which were originally published in Nazi Germany. In August 2014, two cases of this occurred, one case of this occurred during a pro-Palestinian rally which was held in Chicago and the other case of this occurred in Westwood, Los Angeles, where a Jewish store owner received handwritten flyers which contained swastikas and threats. Earlier that year, the SJP in Poughkeepsie published on Twitter an antisemitic picture first published in Germany in 1944.

In September 2014, the New York Post released the contents of a report which was originally published by the NYPD. The report stated that since 2013, the number of antisemitic incidents in the city had increased by 35%. On the other hand, a report of the Los Angeles County Commission on Human Relations revealed a significant decrease of 48 percent in anti-Jewish crimes in LA compared to 2013.

In October 2014, the Anti-Defamation League published a report which documented Anti-Israel activities on campuses after Protective Edge. The report emphasizes that protests and rallies against Israel frequently become antisemitic:

Not all criticism of Israel is anti-Israel in nature, and not all anti-Israel rhetoric and activity reflect antisemitism. However, anti-Israel sentiment increasingly crosses the line to antisemitism by invoking antisemitic myths of Jewish control and demonic depictions of Israelis or comparing Israel's actions to those of the Nazis during the Holocaust.

A survey which was published in February 2015 by Trinity College and the Louis D. Brandeis Center for Human Rights Under Law found that 54 percent of its participants had been subjected to or had witnessed antisemitism on their campuses. The survey included 1,157 self-identified Jewish students at 55 campuses nationwide. The most significant origin for antisemitism, according to the survey, was "from an individual student" (29 percent). Other origins were in clubs or societies, in lectures and classes, and in student unions. The findings of the research were similar to a parallel study conducted in the United Kingdom.

1. Private residence (22.0%)
2. College campus (7.00%)
3. Jewish institution / school (11.0%)
4. Non-Jewish school (12.0%)
5. Public area (35.0%)
6. Private building / area (12.0%)
7. Cemetery (1.00%)

In April 2015, the Anti-Defamation League published its 2014 audit of antisemitic incidents. According to it, there were 912 antisemitic incidents across the U.S. during 2014. This represents a 21 percent increase from the 751 incidents which were reported during the same period in 2013. Most of the incidents (513) belonged to the category of "harassments, threats and events". Another finding of the audit shows that most of the vandalism incidents occurred in public areas (35%). A review of the results shows that during operation Protective Edge there was a significant increase in the number of antisemitic incidents, as compared to the rest of the year. As usual, the highest totals of antisemitic incidents occurred in states with large Jewish populations: New York State – 231 incidents, California – 184 incidents, New Jersey – 107 incidents, Florida – 70 incidents. In all of these states, more antisemitic incidents were counted in 2014 than in the previous year. In the first two months of 2017, nearly 50 bomb threats were made to Jewish community centers across the country.

After the massacres of October 7th 2023, the United States saw the most significant explosion of antisemitism in American history.

== Jewish historical archives and collections ==
=== Audio interviews ===
The University of Pittsburgh houses and has made available a collection of audio interviews produced by the NCJW. Over one hundred audio interviews produced by the Pittsburgh Chapter of NCJW are available online. Those interviewed describe their interactions and affiliations with historical events such as emigration, synagogue events, professional activities and other topics with which they were personally involved. These interviews also include information about personal life events, episodes of discrimination against Jews, moving from Europe to America, meeting Enrico Caruso, Robert Oppenheimer, Jonas Salk and other historical figures. Others that were interviewed came to America but were born elsewhere. Jews from Austria, Brazil, Cuba, Haiti, Hungary, India, Israel, Korea, Poland, and other countries describe their experiences.

=== Written resources ===
Other collections and archives can be found at:

- Guide to the National Council of Jewish Women Collection at the Leo Baeck Institute
- National Council of Jewish Women, Indianapolis Section, Archives
- National Council of Jewish Women Records at the Library of Congress
- A Guide to the National Council of Jewish Women, San Antonio Section, University of Texas at San Antonio Libraries (UTSA Libraries) Special Collections.
- National Council of Jewish Women, New York Section at the American Jewish Historical Society in New York

== See also ==
- List of American Jews
- List of Jewish cemeteries in the United States
- Jewish American Heritage Month
- United States military chaplain symbols, includes information about the history of insignia for Jewish chaplains
- Galveston Movement
- History of the Jews in the American West
- History of the Jews in Ohio
  - History of the Jews in Greater Cleveland
- History of the Jews in Pennsylvania
- History of the Jews in southern Florida
- History of the Jews in Omaha, Nebraska
- History of the Jews in Colonial America
- History of the Jews in Dallas
- History of Jews in San Diego
- Jews in New York City
  - History of the Jews in New York City
  - Jews in Brooklyn
  - Jews in Long Island
