= Congregation Tiferet Israel (Austin, Texas) =

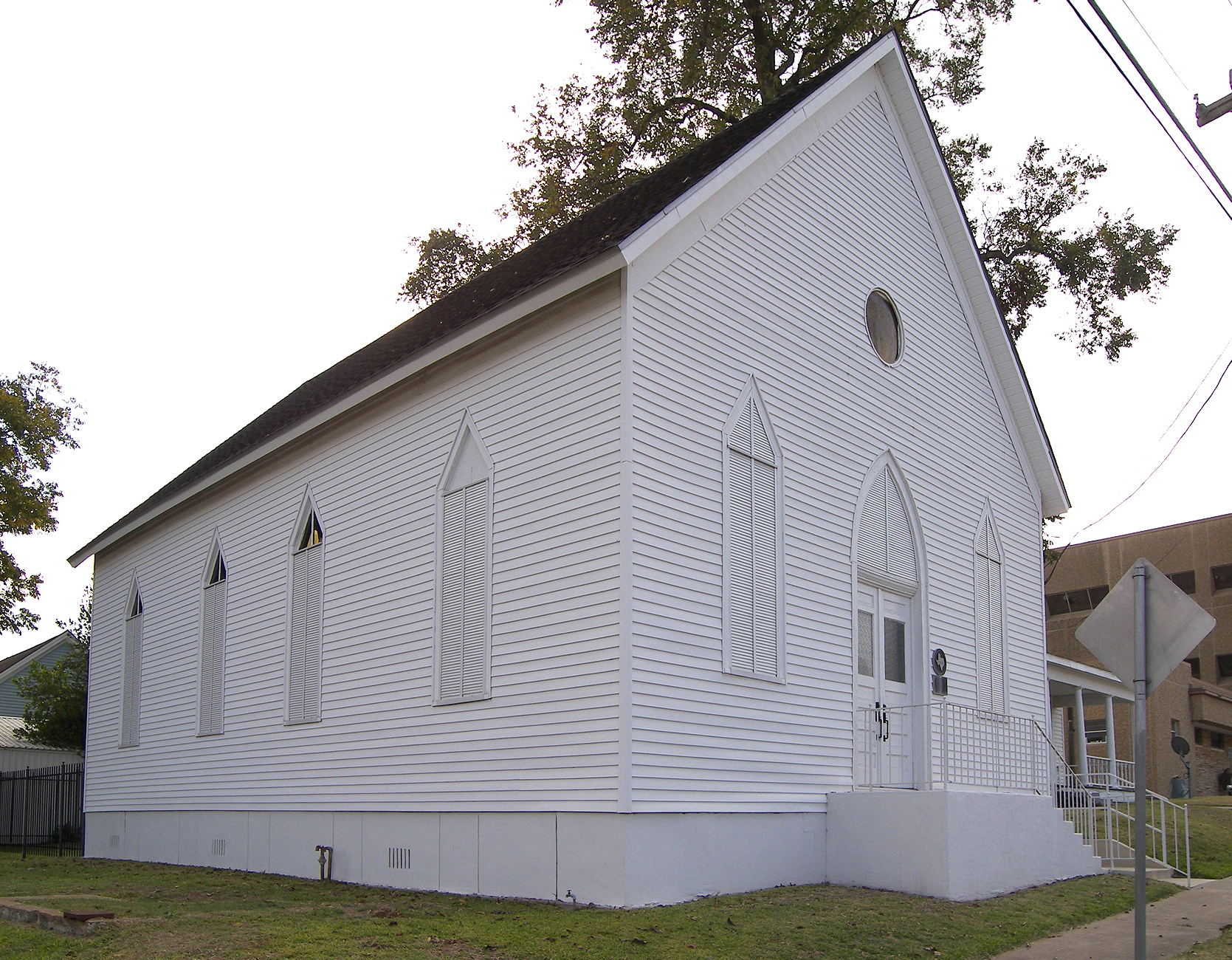
- Synagogue B'nai Abraham in 2008

- Location in Texas

Religion
- Affiliation: Orthodox Judaism
- Ecclesiastical or organizational status: Synagogue
- Leadership: Rabbi Daniel Millner
- Status: Active as Tiferet Israel, formerly B'nai Abraham

Location
- Location: 7300 Hart Lane Austin, Texas
- Country: United States
- Interactive map of Congregation Tiferet Israel
- Coordinates: 30°21′24.09″N 97°45′22.39″W

Architecture
- Type: Synagogue
- Style: Gothic Revival
- Established: 1885 (as B'nai Abraham) 2015 (as Congregation Tiferet Israel)
- Completed: 1892 (destroyed by fire); 1900
- Synagogue B'nai Abraham
- U.S. National Register of Historic Places
- Recorded Texas Historic Landmark
- Area: less than one acre
- MPS: Brenham MPS
- NRHP reference No.: 90000464
- RTHL No.: 8293

Significant dates
- Added to NRHP: March 29, 1990
- Designated RTHL: 1965

Congregation Tiferet Israel is an Orthodox Jewish synagogue in Austin, Texas. The building was dismantled and relocated from Brenham, Texas, where it had been known as the B'nai Abraham Synagogue, a congregation organized in 1885.

== History ==
Early Jewish settlers in the Washington County of Texas arrived during the 1860s. B. Levinson, an original founder, arrived in 1861. Alex Simon arrived in 1866. These individuals became active in the business community of Brenham, and as other Jewish settlers arrived, the need for a synagogue grew. The present building was constructed in 1893, after the first caught fire in 1892. L. Fink served as first president, F. Susnitsky as vice president, L. Z. Harrison as treasurer, and J. Lewis and Abe Fink as secretaries. The twenty charter members were led by Rabbi Israel. In the 1990s the synagogue was believed to be the oldest Orthodox Jewish synagogue to have been in continuous use in Texas. Leon Toubin, a Jewish Texan community and business leader, was the caretaker of this place of worship.

=== Relocation ===
Due to the fall of the Jewish population of Brenham, the synagogue fell out of use. Leon and Mimi Toubin arranged for and paid for moving the building from its original site to Austin, Texas. In early 2015, the building was cut into three sections and moved 90 miles (140 km) west to the Dell Jewish Community Center in the Northwest Hills neighborhood of Austin. The building was pieced back together and upgraded with new insulation, restrooms, air-conditioning and electrical wiring. The synagogue became the home of the Congregation Tiferet Israel. The move resulted in the loss of historic status for the structure.

== Architecture ==
The structure, originally located on 302 North Park Street, served as an Orthodox Shul. The projecting structure on the near side is the Mikveh. The white clapboard structure with its pointed arched windows closely resembles the small country churches in the region. Inside the building the Aron Kodesh can be seen on the eastern wall and in the center the Bimah where the Sefer Torah was read.

== See also ==
- National Register of Historic Places listings in Washington County, Texas
- Recorded Texas Historic Landmarks in Washington County
- History of the Jews in Brenham, Texas
- Texas Jewish Historical Society
- Oldest synagogues in the United States
