= Albert Levy =

Albert Levy may refer to:

- Albert Levy (surgeon) (1800–1848), surgeon to revolutionary Texan forces in 1835
- Albert Lévy (photographer) (1844–1907), French photographer
- Albert Levy (editor) (20th century), editor of the Judaeo-Spanish language magazine La Vara
- Albert Levy Themans (1889–1959), Dutch bobsledder and businessman

== See also ==
- Yank Levy, or Bert Levy (1897–1965), soldier, military instructor and author
