= Leon Toubin =

Jewish Texan civic leader, philanthropist and historian

Leon Toubin (July 26, 1928 – August 15, 2025), known locally as "The Last Jew of Brenham", was a Jewish Texan civic leader, philanthropist, and historian, and the caretaker of B'nai Abraham Synagogue (Brenham, Texas), which he began attending in the late 1930s as part of the daily minyan.

== Family ==
Leon Toubin was the son of Sam H. Toubin and Rosa (Levin) Toubin. The Blinn College website states that, "Sam Toubin, long-time businessman, owned and operated the New York stores in nine towns in Texas. Rosa Toubin, a Brenham native, attended local schools, Blinn College and Rice University. Both were civic leaders and well respected in the Brenham area for their philanthropic endeavors." Leon Toubin was raised in Brenham. Toubin married Miriam “Mimi” Pasternak, with whom he had three children.

== Religious activities ==
After his mother's death in 1989, Toubin became the caretaker of B'nai Abraham Synagogue. The synagogue was formally organized in 1885. Toubin and his wife were the last two members of the congregation. The synagogue's structure was physically moved to Austin, Texas in 2015, where it became Congregation Tiferet Israel.

Toubin was interviewed for several books and a documentary which focused on oral histories of Jews in America, and specifically in Texas. In the book Lone Stars of David: The Jews of Texas, Toubin discusses the history of the Brenham, Texas Jewish community and laments the lack of participation at the synagogue. He expounds on the subject in Growing Up Jewish in America: An Oral History, suggesting that the people of Brenham "were probably all Jewish once, but we're Lutheran now." In the documentary At Home on the Range: Jewish Life in Texas, Toubin tells a similar story about a Washington County Sheriff. The sheriff once told Toubin that "I was probably Jewish. But the family came here and there weren’t any Jewish girls to marry. Everyone intermarried and I'm Lutheran today. But I was probably Jewish at one time."

== Civic leadership and philanthropy ==
Toubin was involved in a project to restore an historic cistern on Toubin's property on Main Street. He was also on the board of trustees for Blinn College, and on the board of directors of the Economic Development Foundation of Brenham. Toubin was also the caretaker of the B'nai Abraham Jewish cemetery.

Leon and Mimi Toubin donated land which became a park in downtown Brenham, developed with a $25,000 community development grant provided by the Lower Colorado River Authority. The park was named Toubin Park.

Toubin and his wife gave money to various organizations, including the Texas Hillel, the "Julie Rogers 'Gift of Life Program'", the Camp Young Judea program in Texas, and The University of Texas "Longhorn Foundation".

== See also ==
- History of the Jews in Brenham, Texas
