= American Jewish Congress v. Bost =

American Jewish Congress v. Bost was an Establishment Clause lawsuit concerning the separation of church and state in Brenham, Texas. The case was the first constitutional challenge to a charitable choice contract.

== History ==
In the community of Brenham, Texas, the American Jewish Congress and the Texas Civil Rights Project filed a lawsuit against a social services program who they believe used a tax funded jobs program to support religious practices which violated the separation of church and state. Other accusations include; use of funds to proselytize, purchase bibles, and coerce participants to "accept Jesus." On May 21, 2002, the Houston Chronicle reported that the case would be sent to federal district court.

== NGO reports ==
The Rockefeller Institute of Government reported that the lawsuit is a response to the 1996 gathering of a number of churches and businesses in Brenham, Texas, that formed the "Jobs Partnership of Washington County," a program which has come under legal scrutiny.

The Texas Freedom Network, a nonpartisan organization, reported that, "The religious message seemed to have a coercive impact on clients. About one-third of the participants said in the program evaluation that they felt pressure to join the host church, Grace Fellowship Baptist Church."

== Final ruling ==
The lawsuit went back and forth between state and federal courts and was twice appealed. In January 2003, the lawsuit that is believed to the first constitutional challenge to a “charitable choice” contract, came to a conclusion. The case was finally dismissed, "on the ground that there was no live controversy."

== See also ==
- History of the Jews in Brenham, Texas
