= Texas Jewish Historical Society =

The Texas Jewish Historical Society, (sometimes abbreviated TJHS), which began in 1980, is a society dedicated to the preservation of Jewish history in Texas.

== History ==
The society was founded in 1980 by Rabbi Jimmy Kessler of Galveston. He published letters in Jewish newspapers in Houston, Dallas and Fort Worth, inviting people to participate in the creation of a historical society to preserve and appreciate Jewish history in Texas. Today TJHS has about 800 members, who meet quarterly around the state. Membership is open to anyone who wants to "further the Society’s goals."

In addition, as a result of increasing interest, the University of Texas has included the study of Texas Jewish history as one of its acknowledged fields, the first university to do so. This is part of a wider movement to study the history of Jewish life in the Americas since the several major European migrations to this region.

== References and records ==
TJHS's website states that their purpose is to, "collect, preserve, publish and disseminate materials having reference to the settlement and history of Jews in Texas and their participation in its social, economic, religious, political, professional and cultural growth." Texas Jewish Historical Society The TJHS records are located at The Center for American History, part of the University of Texas at Austin.

== Publications ==
- "Why Save the Historic Brenham Synagogue?" in Chronicles: A Publication of the Texas Jewish Historical Society, Vol. I, No. 1 (1994), 33-39.
- Toubin, Rosa Levin, Bryan-College Station: Temple Freda. Texas Jewish Historical Society.

== See also ==
- American Jewish Historical Society
- History of the Jews in Texas
- List of historical societies in Texas
