= Simon Theatre =

- U.S. Historic district – Contributing property
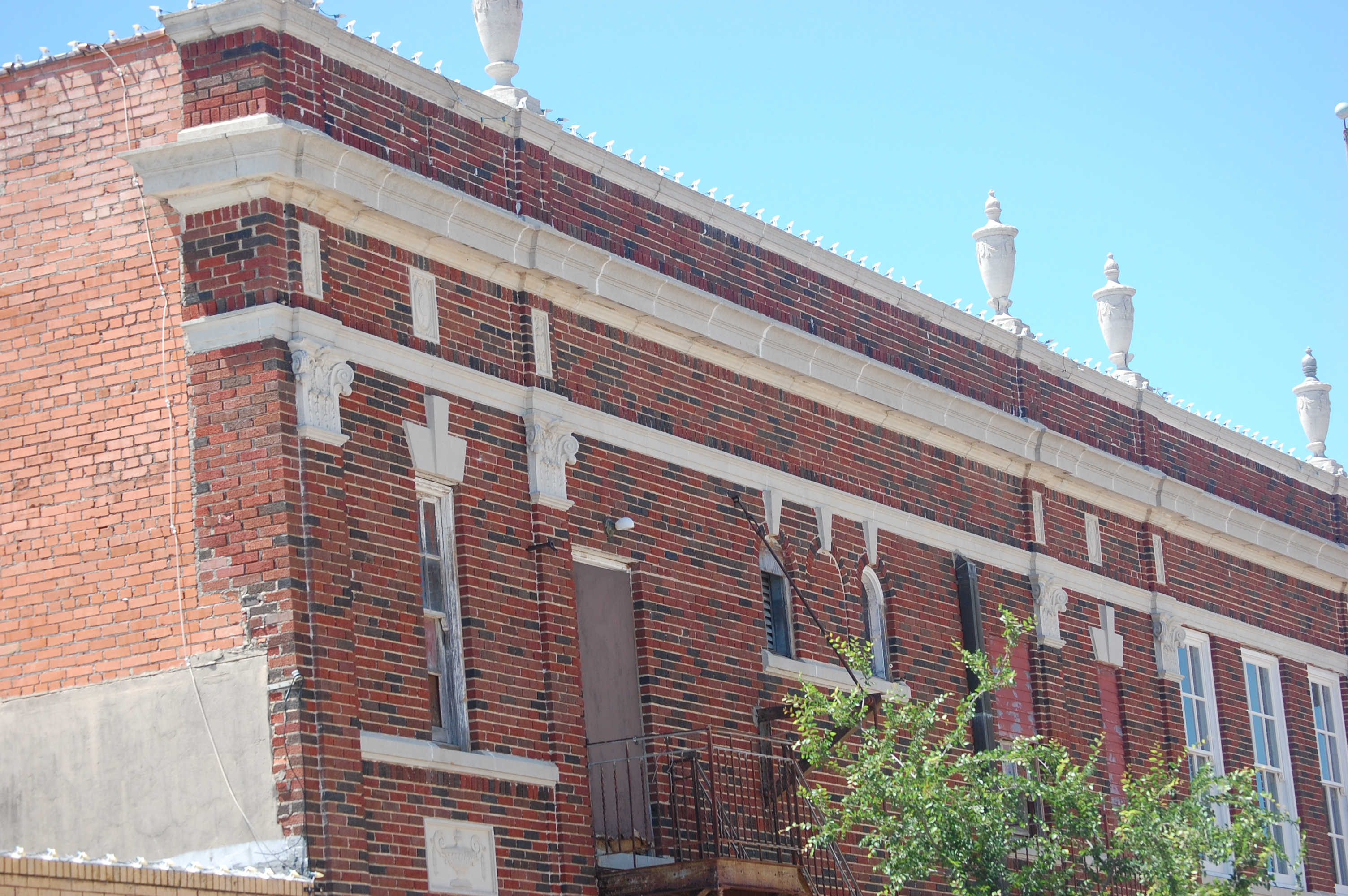
- View of the upper story of the Simon Theatre in 2010

- Location within Texas Location within the United States
- Location: 109 W. Main St., Brenham, Texas
- Coordinates: 30°10′2″N 96°23′54″W
- Area: less than one acre
- Built: 1925
- Built by: R.P. Ball
- Architect: Alfred Finn
- Part of: Brenham Downtown Historic District (ID04000154)
- Designated CP: March 10, 2004

The Simon Theatre is a theater in Brenham, Texas. It was built by James Simon, designed by Houston architect Alfred C. Finn, and constructed in 1925. For many decades the Simon Theatre provided the community with a setting for theatrical performances, vaudeville acts, ballroom dances, special events and movies.

== Recognition ==
The Simon Theatre is recognized by The League of Historic American Theatres as a Texas Historic Theatre, and the Architecture Division of the Texas Historical Commission has listed it as an Endangered Historic Property. The Brenham Main Street Historical Preservation, an historical preservation project, is creating a downtown visitor center within the building. The Simon Theatre is part of the Brenham Downtown Historic District, an historical landmark on the National Register of Historic Places.

== Simon Center ==
The Simon Theatre is currently under renovations and will be renamed the Simon Center. "Save our Simon" is an organization dedicated to the preservation of the Simon Theatre. On September 28, 2007, the organization raised $1.2 million for the renovation of the Simon Theatre. On February 22, 2007, the chairman of the Texas Historical Commission, John Nau, stated that the Simon Center in downtown Brenham would restore a historic building and be, "a tremendous economic development investment for the community." The plans include refurbishing the 83-year-old theater and ballroom so that it may be used as a convention center and visitors center. The "Save Our Simon reached the $2 million mark at the end of 2008 and has raised $2.3 million so far."

"Dallas architecture ArchiTexas is overseeing the design of the theater. The company has done restorations of courthouses and other old theaters in Texas." Donna Cummins - Save Our Simon administrator stated.

== See also ==
- National Register of Historic Places listings in Washington County, Texas
- History of the Jews in Brenham, Texas
