= Jimmy Kessler =

American rabbi from Texas

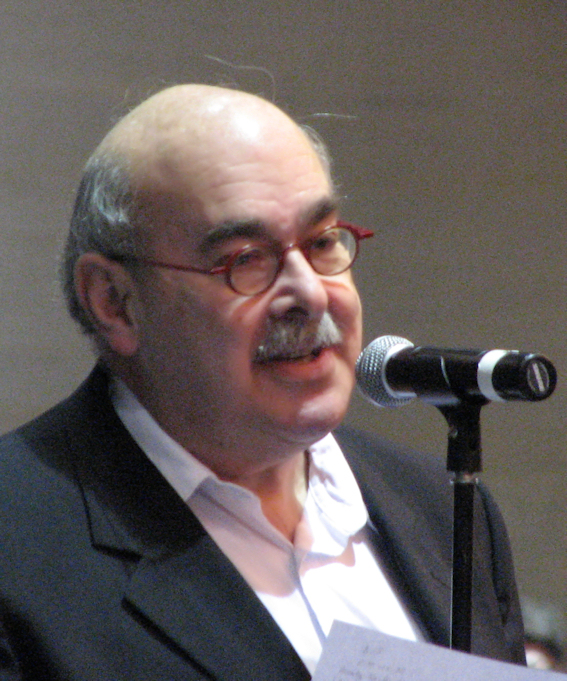
- Rabbi Jimmy Kessler speaking before the University of Texas System Board of Regents in support of UTMB and John Sealy Hospital.
- Born: James Lee Kessler; December 10, 1945; Houston, Texas, United States
- Died: September 14, 2022 (aged 76); Galveston, Texas, United States
- Occupation: Rabbi

James Lee Kessler (December 10, 1945 – September 14, 2022), the founder of the Texas Jewish Historical Society, was the first native Texan to serve as rabbi of Congregation B'nai Israel in Galveston, Texas.

== Early life and education ==
Kessler was born in Houston, Texas. After attending local schools including being valedictorian and president of his graduating class at San Jacinto Senior High School, he earned his BA from the University of Texas in Austin, where he was a member of Tau Delta Phi fraternity. He earned the first doctorate in Texas Jewish history, at the Hebrew Union College Jewish Institute of Religion in Cincinnati, where he was also ordained as a rabbi.

== Career ==
Kessler first served as director of the Texas Hillel, which serves the students attending the University of Texas. While there, Kessler taught very popular courses in the Religious Studies programs at UT and served on several committees at the request of the university president.

He was a counselor at a summer retreat for Jewish youth - Echo Hill Ranch. This was a camp for kids and pre-teens situated near Kerrville, TX. In its heyday, it was host to over 200 campers each year in the 1960s through to about 2000.

In 1976, he was called as rabbi of Congregation B'nai Israel in Galveston, Texas, serving them for five years. He returned as rabbi in 1989, and led the congregation until 2014 when he became Rabbi Emeritus. This is the first and oldest Reform Jewish congregation in Texas.

Kessler's strong dedication to education and youth continued: he served as campus minister to Jewish students at the University of Texas Medical Branch at Galveston (UTMB), and taught philosophy at Galveston College. He also served as Jewish chaplain for patients at UTMB's hospitals.

== Academics and leadership ==
Based on his long interest in Texas Jewish history, in concert with colleagues and friends, Kessler founded the Texas Jewish Historical Society in March 1980. He was also elected the first and founding president. Today the society has grown to more 750 members and has sponsored and supported research for scholars and students of Texas Jewish history.

Kessler was a member of the Editorial Advisory Board for the Texas State Historical Association's Handbook of Texas, where he also held the position of Jewish History Editor.

== Public service ==
Kessler was engaged in numerous public activities: he was appointed as the first Chairman of the Church-State Relations Advisory Board of the Texas Department of Human Resources.

He participated in the management of foundations, such as director of the Harris & Eliza Kempner Fund, trustee for the Abe and Anne Siebel Fund, and director of the Abe and Peggy Levy Fund. He was a 27-year member of the Institutional Review Board of the University of Texas Medical Branch. He was a member of the Human Research Committee at the Transitional Learning Center, and founding chair of the Community Liaison Committee for the Galveston National Laboratory.

He was chaplain for the Galveston County Sheriff's Office.

In July 2009, Kessler became the first rabbi in the 171-year history of Texas freemasonry to be named the presiding officer of a Masonic lodge, when Harmony Lodge of Galveston installed him as its new leader. Harmony Lodge was established in 1839. In 2015 he was appointed the Grand Chaplain of the Most Worshipful Grand Lodge of Texas, FA&AM. Jimmy Kessler was a 33rd Degree Scottish Rite Mason and was also a York Rite Mason.

== Death ==
Jimmy Kessler died on September 14, 2022, of cancer. Jewish religious and Masonic funeral services were held at Temple B'nai Israel in Galveston.

== Legacy and honors ==
- Awarded an honorary Doctorate in Divinity from Hebrew Union College-Jewish Institute of Religion
- Awarded the first certification by the Texas Jewish Historical Society for the Extraordinary Preservation of Texas Jewish History.

== Books ==
- Kessler, with Cathy Schechter and Ruthe Winegarten, wrote Deep in the Heart: The Lives and Legends of Texas Jews : A Photographic History. (1990)
- Songs for the Soul: Selections from Psalms(1995)
- Henry Cohen: The Life of a Frontier Rabbi. (1997)
- Ramblings of a Texan rabbi (2020)

== See also ==
- History of the Jews in Galveston, Texas
