= Jao de la Porta =

American merchant

Jao de la Porta (also José da Porta), along with his older brother Morin, was a Portuguese Jewish merchant important in the early settlement of the Texan coast.

João was born in Portugal but attended school in Paris, before moving to Brazil, the British West Indies, and finally New Orleans. Along with his brother, João provided the financing for the privateer Louis Michel Aury, who established his base at the site of future Galveston in Spanish Texas, in 1816.

The same year, Mexican revolutionary general Francisco Javier Mina visited and successfully encouraged Aury to join him in an invasion, which failed. Morin da Porta left Galveston and soon died, and João sold Aury's camp and supplies to Jean Lafitte, who relocated to Galveston from Matagorda Bay on 15 May 1817. A year later, João was appointed supercargo for trade with the Karankawa Indians. Lafitte left in 1820, and João later returned to New Orleans.

== See also ==
- History of the Jews in Galveston, Texas

== Sources ==
- Natalie Ornish: De la Porta Brothers from the Handbook of Texas Online. Retrieved 5 February 2010.
- 'The Jewish Texans'.
