= Albert Levy (surgeon) =

American scientist

Albert Moses Levy (1800–1848) was a Dutch-American medical doctor best known for his work as a surgeon to the Texas Military Forces during and after the Texas Revolution.

== Early life ==
Levy was born into a Jewish family in the Netherlands, probably in Amsterdam; his parents were Abraham Levy and Rachel Cornelia Levy, née Bernard. The Levys immigrated to Richmond, Virginia, in 1818. Albert Levy attended the School of Medicine at the University of Pennsylvania, graduating in 1832. He married Episcopalian Maria A. Bishop around 1830. They had one daughter, born 1832. The family relocated to Pittsylvania County, Virginia, in 1834, but Maria died the following year. Levy relocated to New Orleans, home of his brother Lewis, leaving his daughter in the care of his sister in Richmond.

== Texas Revolution and later life ==
Levy soon joined the New Orleans Greys, a voluntary militia group supporting the Texas Revolution. After arriving in Texas, he was appointed chief surgeon of Texas' voluntary army. He was injured in the Siege of Béxar but remained in the army until February 10, 1836, when he left to join the Texas Navy. His career as a naval surgeon included stints on the Brutus and the Independence. On April 17, 1837, Mexican forces captured the Independence and took the crew prisoner. Three months later Levy escaped and returned to Texas on foot.

Levy established a practice in Matagorda and was appointed to the Medical Board of the Republic of Texas in 1838. The same year he married another Episcopalian, Claudinia Olivia Gervais, with whom he had five children. He committed suicide in May 1848.

The state of Texas commemorates Levy with a historical marker in Matagorda. The City of Houston celebrated Albert Moses Levy Memorial Day on April 30, 1986, to honor Levy and other Jewish Texans who fought for Texas independence.
