= Charitable choice =

Charitable choice refers to direct United States government funding of religious organizations to provide social services.

Created in 1996, charitable choice allows government officials to purchase services from religious providers using Temporary Assistance for Needy Families (TANF), Welfare-to-Work, and Community Services Block Grant (CSBG) funds. In late 2000, charitable choice was included in the Substance Abuse and Mental Health Services Administration’s (SAMHSA) block grant.

== Principles ==
Charitable Choice has gained support from policymakers due to its unique approach to social services. In this faith-based model or the so-called holistic relief (also known as whole-person ministry), a religious organization addresses the needs of the poor both on the material and spiritual levels. The element of faith in the social service framework does not necessarily mean a focus on specific religious programs or initiatives based on a specific religious denomination. Proponents of the concept explain that instead, it pertains to a broad religious framework wherein all religious forms are included in providing social support.

According to the Department of Health and Human Services, Charitable Choice rests on four major principles:

=== A Level Playing Field ===
Faith-based providers are eligible to provide federally-funded social services on the same basis as any other providers, neither excluded nor included because they are religious, too religious or of a different religion.

=== Respect for Allies ===
The religious character of faith-based providers is protected by allowing them to retain control over the definition, development, practice, and expression of their religious beliefs. Neither federal nor state government can require a religious provider to alter its form of internal governance or remove religious art, icons, scripture or other symbols in order to be a program participant.

=== Protecting Clients ===
In regard to rendering assistance, religious organization shall not discriminate against an individual on the basis of religion, a religious belief, or refusal to actively participate in a religious practice. If an individual objects to the religious character of a program, a secular alternative must be provided.

=== Church-State Separation ===
All government funds must be used to fulfill the public social service goals, and no direct government funding can be diverted to inherently religious activities such as worship, sectarian instruction, and proselytization.

== Controversy ==
Some are concerned that charitable choice blurs the separation of church and state and argue that federal financial support of faith-based organizations creates an opportunity for abuse and potential for funds to flow in a biased way towards groups affiliated with one particular denomination or religious tradition. Specifically, critics argue that it violates the religion clause of the First Amendment. Some examples of lawsuits that raised this issue were the cases that challenged the constitutionality of the Charitable Choice programs in Texas and Kentucky.

In addition, some religious organizations such as the Interfaith Alliance are concerned about the impact of charitable choice "on the vitality of the prophetic voice of faith, the integrity of religious autonomy, excessive government entanglement in the affairs of religious institutions and the overarching temptation to abuse religion and manipulate faith to achieve political power."

On the other hand, the U.S. Supreme Court has increasingly taken a permissive position regarding the constitutionality of the Charitable Choice. In several decisions, it established a relaxation of the constraints imposed and assumptions made concerning public funding of the secular initiatives of religious organizations.
