= History of the Jews in Dallas =

Dallas is the third-largest city in Texas and has one of the largest Jewish communities in the state.

== Early history ==
Many Jews, primarily from various German principalities, arrived in Dallas during a wave of mid-nineteenth century immigration to Texas following the Revolutions of 1848 in Europe. Some of these Jews were "Forty-eighters" who had supported the revolutions.

The city's first Jewish cemetery was established in 1854. At this point in time, the small but growing Jewish community wanted to establish permanent religious structure and engage a Rabbi in order to conduct services and offer religious education for children. In 1872, the "Hebrew Benevolent Association" was formed, a charity relief organization that also sponsored the city's first High Holiday services.

=== Synagogues ===
In 1873, several families founded the first congregation in the Dallas area, Temple Emanu-El (originally "Jewish Congregation Emanu-El), a Reform congregation. In 1875, Temple Emanu-El was chartered, and it engaged its first rabbi, Aaron Suhler. In 1876, the congregation built a small red brick temple in the Byzantine style at Commerce and Church (now Field) streets in downtown Dallas. In 1906, Temple Emanu-El joined the Union of American Hebrew Congregations an association of Reform congregations.

Shearith Israel (originally "Shaareth Israel") was founded in Deep Ellum as an Orthodox synagogue in 1884. Originally, the congregation was quite small and included only a dozen men. Accordingly, the congregation initially met on the second floor of a local grocery store. Shearith Israel was chartered in 1886. In 1892, Shearith Israel constructed a synagogue on Jackson Street, and its congregation grew to fifty-five members by 1900. The 1908 Texas Zionist Association Convention was held at Shearith Israel.

In 1890, eleven Orthodox Jews founded Tiferet Israel. The congregation purchased a house for use as a synagogue in 1893 and used it for two years before demolishing it and constructing a synagogue on the same lot. From 1900 to 1906, Tiferet Israel and Shearith Israel shared the same rabbi.

A group of Austrian and Romanian Jews from Austria-Hungary established Anshe Sphard (also called "Roumanishe Shul"^{A}), a "Sephardic rite" hassidic synagogue, in 1906. In 1913, the congregation purchased a house that was used as a synagogue until 1936, when the congregation acquired a former telephone exchange building.

=== Economic contributions ===
Many Jewish merchants contributed to the growth of Dallas, often working together for the betterment of the city. Because Jewish merchants were often the prime supporters of the community's cultural institutions and charities, their economic health often dictated the economic health of the city. Local newspapers received most of their income from advertising from Jewish merchants, enabling them to remain independent and impartial in their reporting unlike European newspapers which were often funded by a particular political party. Jewish merchants were often among the largest bank depositors and frequently sat on the boards of local banks.

== Modern history ==
In 1947, a member of the Jewish community in Dallas began printing the Texas Jewish Post. In 1957 the temple moved to its present location in North Dallas. Architects Howard R. Meyer and Max M. Sandfield, with noted California architect William W. Wurster as consultant, received an Award of Merit from the American Institute of Architects for the design of the present structure, which was enhanced by art coordinator György Kepes of the Massachusetts Institute of Technology.

The Handbook of Texas states that, "The formal preservation of the history of Texas Jewry goes back to Rabbi Henry Cohen of Galveston and Rabbi David Lefkowitz of Dallas, who set out to interview as many early settlers and their families as possible. They produced a historical account for the Texas Centennial in 1936."

In 1956, Anshe Sphard merged with Shearith Israel.

== Education ==
Private Jewish K-12 schools in the Dallas area include:

- Yavneh Academy of Dallas (grades 9-12)
- Mesorah High School for Girls (grades 9-12)
- Akiba Academy (grades PK-8)
  - Opened in 1962, it is currently located in the Schultz Rosenberg Campus, named after the donors Howard and Leslie Schultz and Marcus and Ann Rosenberg. 115,000 square feet (10,700 m^{2}) large, it had a cost of $20 million. It was originally at 6210 Churchill Way but moved in 2005. As of 2005 it had 300 students.
- The Ann and Nate Levine Academy (grades Early Education-8)
  - In 1979 the Solomon Schechter Academy of Dallas, then the day school of the Shearith Israel, opened. The institution and the school became separate institutions in 1997 and the school received its current name in 2005.
- Torah Day School of Dallas (TDSD) (grades K-8)
  - Opened in August 2003, it is located in a former supermarket and was renovated by Joe Funk Construction.

Levine Academy is a Conservative Judaism school, and Yavneh is a Modern Orthodox school. The schools following Orthodox Judaism are Akiba Academy and Mesorah High.

Isaac Mayer Wise Academy, a Reform Judaism school, was previously in operation. The school, founded in 1996, opened in 1997, and closed in 2006.

For a period of time prior to the 1970s, Hillcrest High School was known as "Hebrew High" due to the number of Jewish students enrolled.

Texas Torah Institute, (TTI) is an Orthodox Jewish high school (grades 9-12) which also has a post-high-school program. The school opened in 2003 and was started by Rabbis Eliyahu Kaufman and Shlomo Pacht. Later Rabbi Daniel Ringelheim joined the school. All three Rabbis are the Roshei Hayeshiva who obtained their ordination from the Rabbinical Seminary of America. The school specializes in Talmudic education for all of its students.

== Notable Jews of Dallas ==
- Mark Cuban: Businessman and owner of the Dallas Mavericks.
- Adolph Harris: founder of A. Harris and Co. department store in 1891.
- Emanuel Meyer Kahn: founder of E. M. Kahn and Company in 1872, which continued for ninety-two years as a family-owned business; it was the oldest retail store in Dallas, the city's first air-conditioned store and the first store west of the Mississippi with fixed prices.
- Arthur Kramer: son-in-law of Adolph Harris and president of A. Harris and Co. for 37 years. He was also president of the Dallas Symphony Society, Dallas Art Association, and the Dallas Grand Opera Association.
- Edward Titche Levy: served as Executive Director of the Dallas Community Chest from 1922 to 1939. Also on the board of Dallas Trust and Savings Bank.
- Joseph Linz, Elias, Simon, Ben and Albert Linz: founded the Linz Brothers jewelry firm in 1891.
- Herbert Marcus, sister Carrie Marcus Neiman and her husband Abraham Lincoln Neiman: founders of Neiman Marcus department store in 1907.
- Minnie Lichtenstein Marcus: Herbert Marcus' wife and Vice President of Neiman Marcus. She was also on the board of several organizations including the Dallas Jewish Welfare Federation, Temple Emanu-El, Golden Acres Dallas Home for Jewish Aged, and had a prominent role in founding the Dallas Garden Center. Her sons and other descendants including Lawrence Marcus and Stanley Marcus have been active in the family business and in other endeavors in Dallas and elsewhere.
- Iliza Shlesinger: comedian
- Phillip Sanger and Alex Sanger: managers of the Dallas Sanger Brothers department store, which opened in 1872 and soon became the main store.
- Alex Sanger was the first Jew to be appointed as a regent of the University of Texas. He was elected as a City Alderman and served the City of Dallas throughout his life in many capacities: State Fair Exposition, Volunteer Fireman Engine Company #1, Director of City National Bank of Dallas, Director of the Board of Trade, and Director of the Dallas Club.
- Edward Titche - co-founder of Titche-Goettinger department store in 1902; original member of the Citizen's Charter Association; he served as vice president of the Dallas Scottish Rite Hospital for Crippled Children. Titche was the second life member of the Texas Congress of Parents and Teachers; he became a charter trustee of the Dallas Historical Society; and he was on the board of Dallas Trust and Savings Bank. Edward Titche Elementary School in Dallas was named for him.
- Max Goettinger - founder of the Titche-Goettinger department store in 1902, with Edward Titche.

== Other community members ==
- Adlene Harrison, mayor
- Martin Frost, Congressman
- Ruth Brown Kahn, community leader and archivist
- George E. Kessler, city planner and architect
- David Lefkowitz, rabbi
- Stanley Marcus, retailer
- Lawrence Marcus, retailer and World War II veteran
- Leon A. Harris, Jr., grandson of Adolph, wrote The Merchant Princes (1980) a biopic about the Dallas Jewish clothing and retail store elite and his connections to them
- Levi Olan, rabbi
- Jack Ruby, murderer of Lee Harvey Oswald
- Julius Schepps, businessman, civic leader and philanthropist
- David E. Stern, rabbi
- Annette Strauss, mayor
- Robert Schwarz Strauss, leading figure in national politics and diplomacy
- Steven D. Wolens, state representative
- Abraham Zapruder, filmer of home video of assassination of John F. Kennedy

== Notes ==
A. Yiddish for "Romanian Shul" or "Romanian Synagogue"
