= Neiman Marcus Building =

Department store and offices in Dallas, Texas

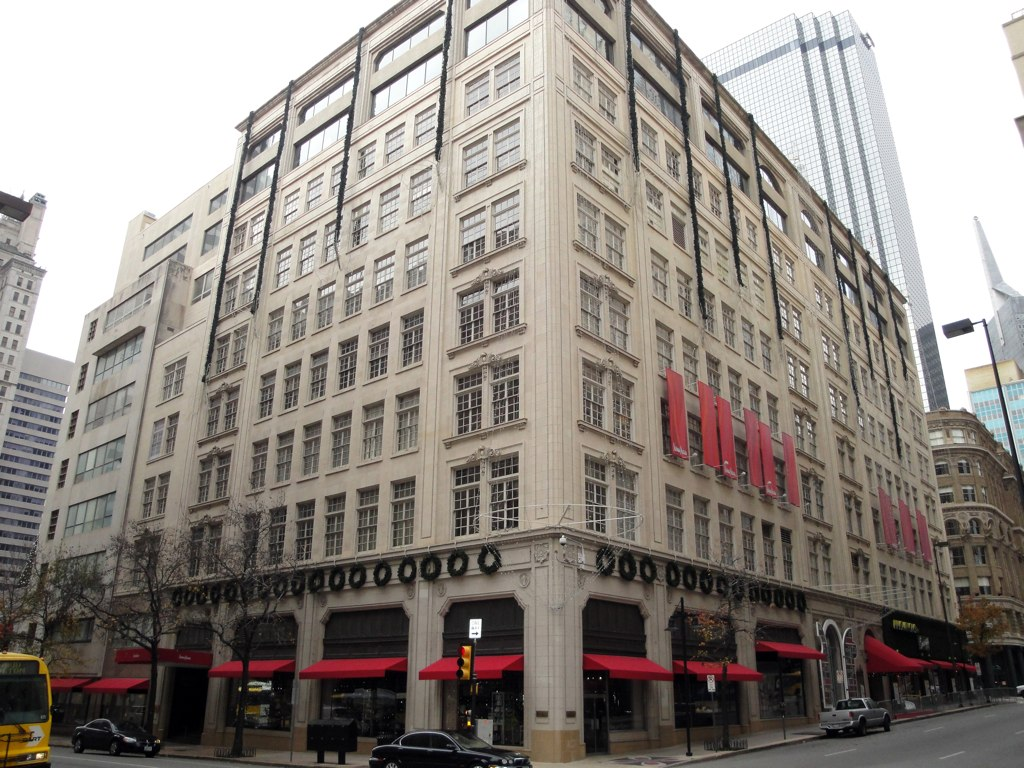
- Exterior of Neiman Marcus Building (2010)

General information
- Status: Closed
- Type: Department store
- Architectural style: Renaissance Revival
- Location: 1618 Main Street, Dallas, Texas, United States
- Coordinates: 32.780637°N 96.797416°W
- Current tenants: Neiman Marcus (Saks Global)
- Opened: 1914; 112 years ago
- Renovated: 1926; 1941; 1951; 1970; 1983; 1994
- Client: Herbert Marcus; Abraham Lincoln Neiman; Carrie Marcus Neiman

Technical details
- Floor count: 9
- Floor area: 129,000 square feet (12,000 m^{2}) of selling space

Design and construction
- Architect: George Dahl

Website
- Store information
- Neiman Marcus
- U.S. Historic district – Contributing property
- Part of: Dallas Downtown Historic District (ID04000894)
- Designated CP: August 11, 2006

The Neiman Marcus Building is a former department store located in the Main Street District in downtown Dallas, Texas, United States. It was designed by George Dahl for Herbert Marcus, Abraham Lincoln Neiman, and Carrie Marcus Neiman, and opened in 1914; it replaced the first store founded in 1907 on Elm Street, which burned down in 1913. It was the flagship store of the Neiman Marcus department store chain until it closed on September 30, 2026.. The building was also the corporate headquarters of Neiman Marcus until 2022. It was the last of the original department stores still serving downtown Dallas. The building is listed on the National Register of Historic Places as a contributing property of the Dallas Downtown Historic District.

== History ==
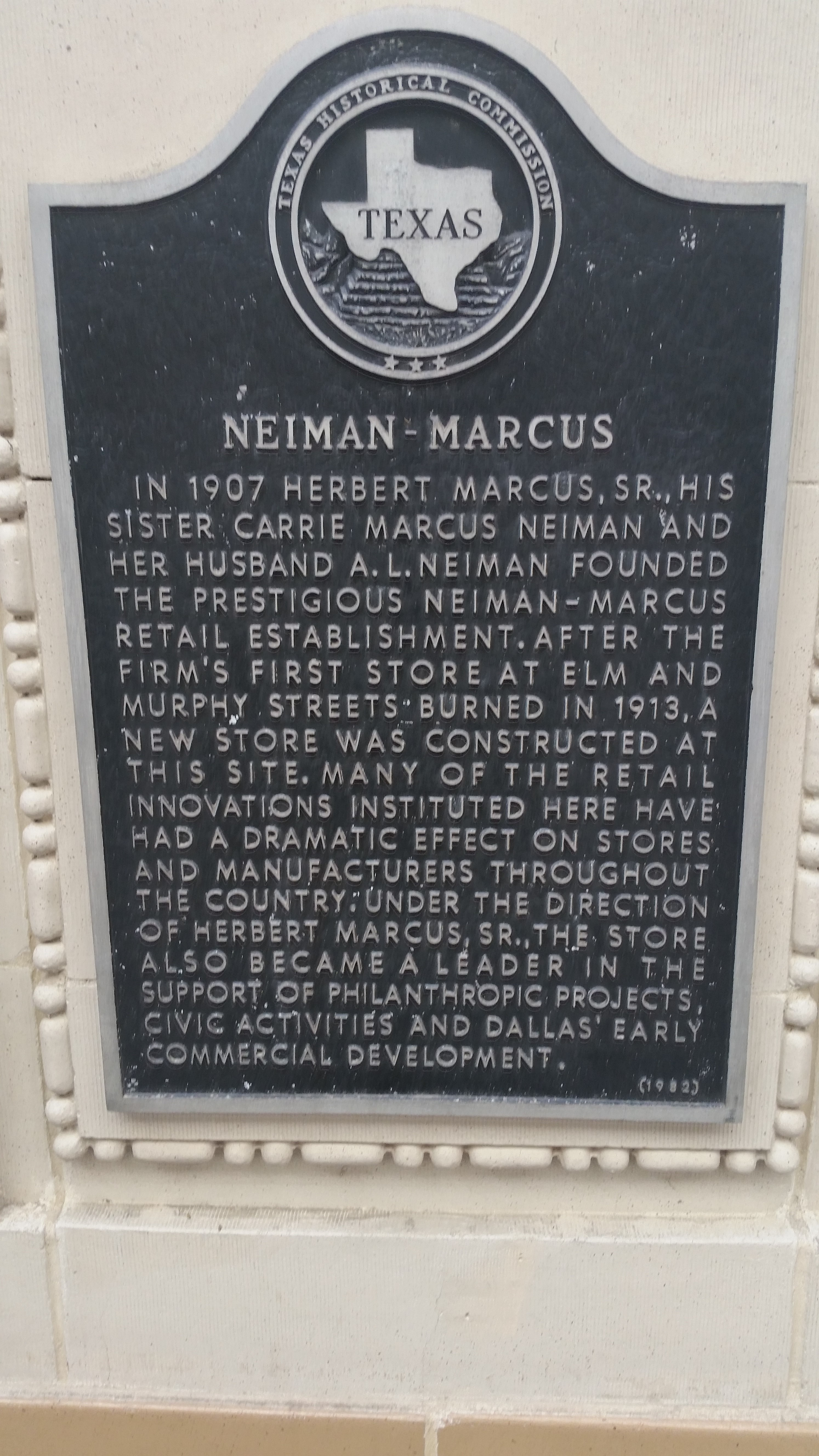
Texas historical marker for Neiman Marcus

The building was designed for Neiman Marcus to replace its previous store on Elm Street which burned in 1913. Designed to be fireproof and accommodate additional floors as needed, the red brick and white stone building opened on September 15, 1914 with four floors at the corner of Main and Ervay. In 1926, the company leased adjacent land and an identical four-story addition extended the store facing Ervay to Commerce Street that it completed in 1927. This addition, designed by architect George Dahl, doubled the retail space, replaced the exterior brick veneer with white terra cotta, and enlarged the store's entrances. The design of the building was based on Renaissance Revival architecture, and the interior featured an impressive double staircase. In 1931, the building was air-conditioned in an elaborate stunt from New York offices via a Western Union link.

The building continued to expand with growth, and in 1941 every floor of the building was remodeled. Over the years, the store acquired adjacent land to the west along Commerce Street and Main Street. Beginning in 1951 and ending in 1953 two additional floors were added to the original building in a similar but less detailed manner, bringing the store to six floors. New six-story structures, modern in style, were built adjacent to the store along Commerce Street and Main Street. These additions again doubled the size of the store, although the new buildings did not match the original store's design. The additions provided greater room for employee services, a penthouse restaurant and expanded departments. During the late 1950s, a seventh floor was added in a similar style to the previous fifth and sixth floor additions.

On December 19, 1964, the building burned in the costliest blaze in the city's history, destroying $5–10 million in merchandise, art objects and antique furniture. Remarkably, the building was not destroyed, and it reopened just 27 days later.

The last major expansion added two floors to the top of the entire complex in 1983, giving the structure a height of nine stories. These additional floors provided more room for the growing department store chain's corporate offices.

During the late 1980s, Neiman Marcus considered leaving the building for a new downtown shopping center, but with revitalization of the Main Street District the store remained in its original location.

In 2022, Neiman Marcus moved its corporate offices from the building to the Cityplace Tower. After the chain's 2024 sale to Saks Global, the corporate offices there were closed completely. In February 2025, Saks Global announced that the flagship store itself would close on March 31, 2025. However, a last-minute deal was reached three days prior to the planned closing, allowing it to stay open through the end of the year. In November 2025, it was announced that the store would remain open into 2026. On June 2, 2026, it was announced that the store would close permanently on September 30, 2026.

On September 30, 2026, Neiman Marcus' Downtown Dallas location closed its doors after 112 years of operation. Dale T. Smith, a collector of Neiman Marcus memorabilia was the last to purchase an item at the former flagship: a bottle of Tom Ford cologne. A bagpiper played "Amazing Grace" and a singer sang Frank Sinatra's "My Way" as the store closed.

== Features ==
- The Zodiac was the signature lunch restaurant which operated for over 70 years. Located on the sixth floor, it was known as the place to mingle with the who's-who of downtown.
- The flagship store was the centerpiece of Neiman Marcus holiday celebrations. Each year the building's exterior was covered in thousands of lights, a special Christmas Tree was commissioned and holiday windows were revealed to eager crowds.

== Gallery ==
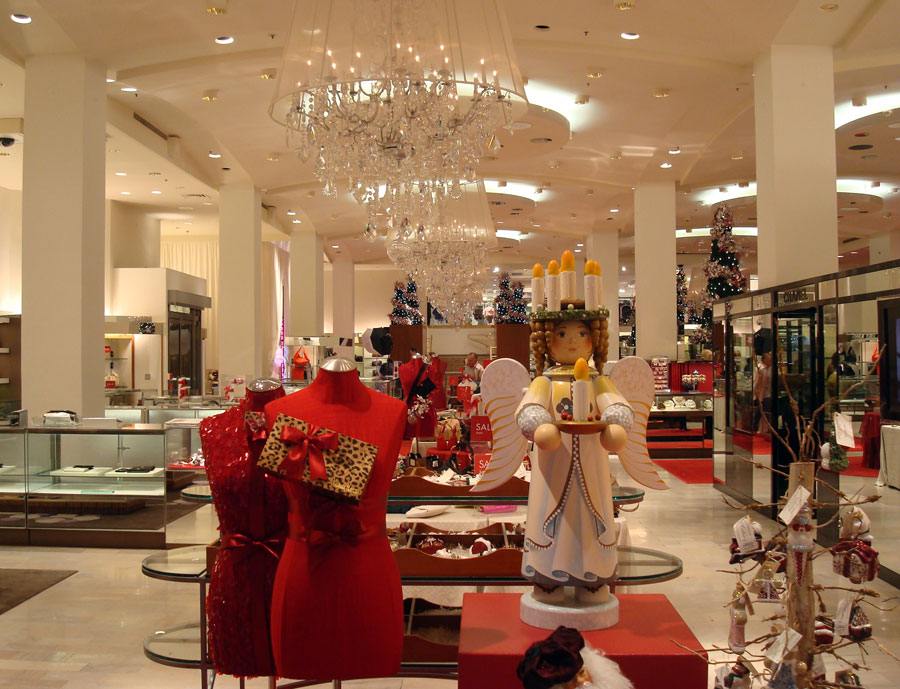

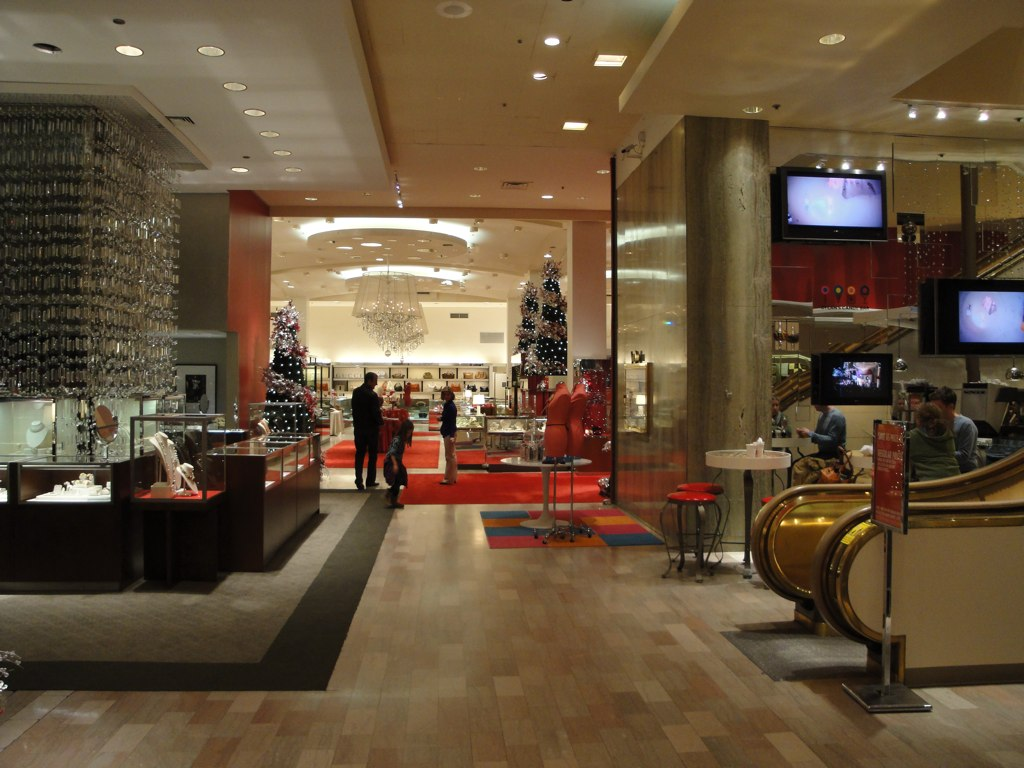

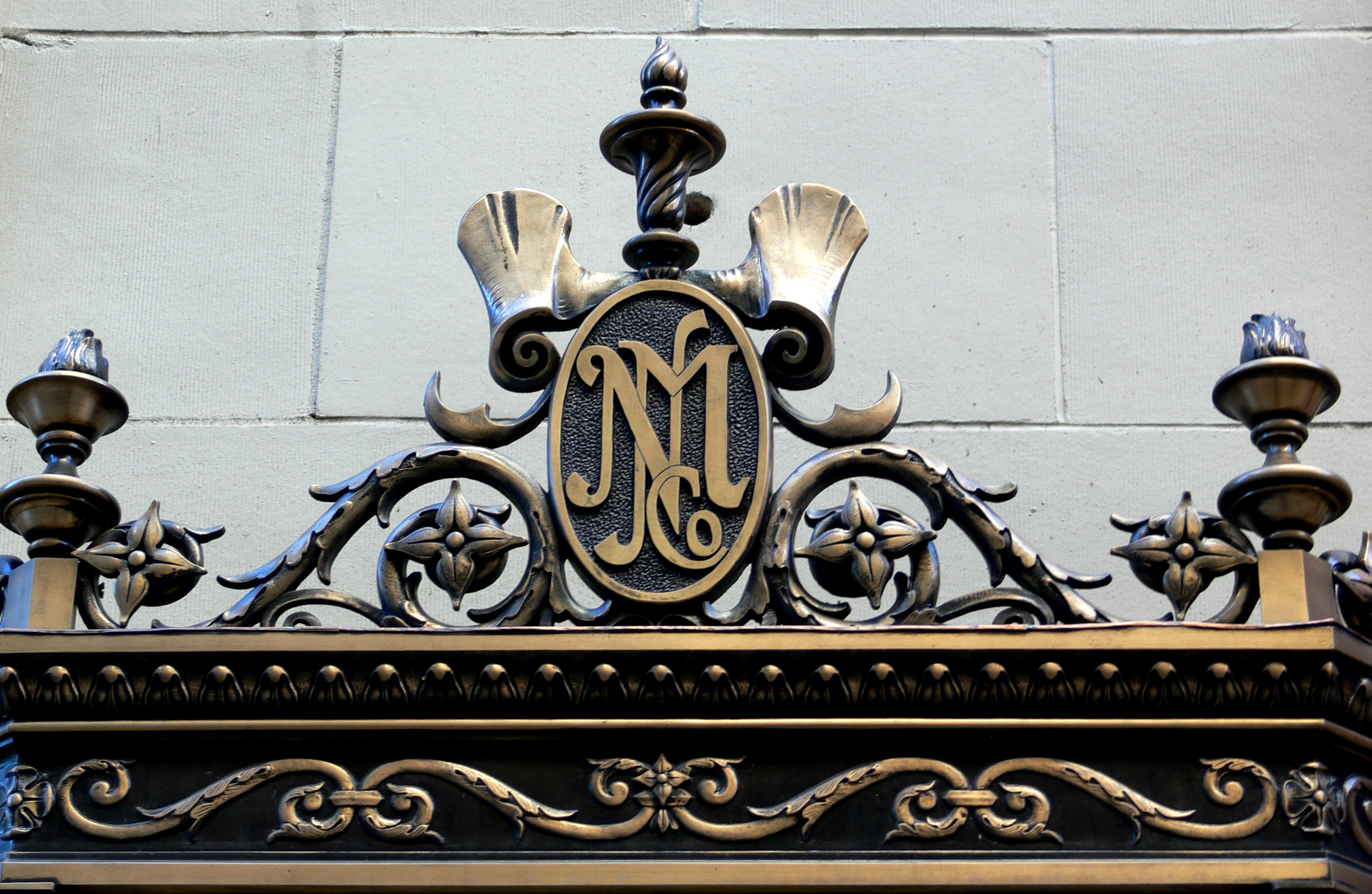

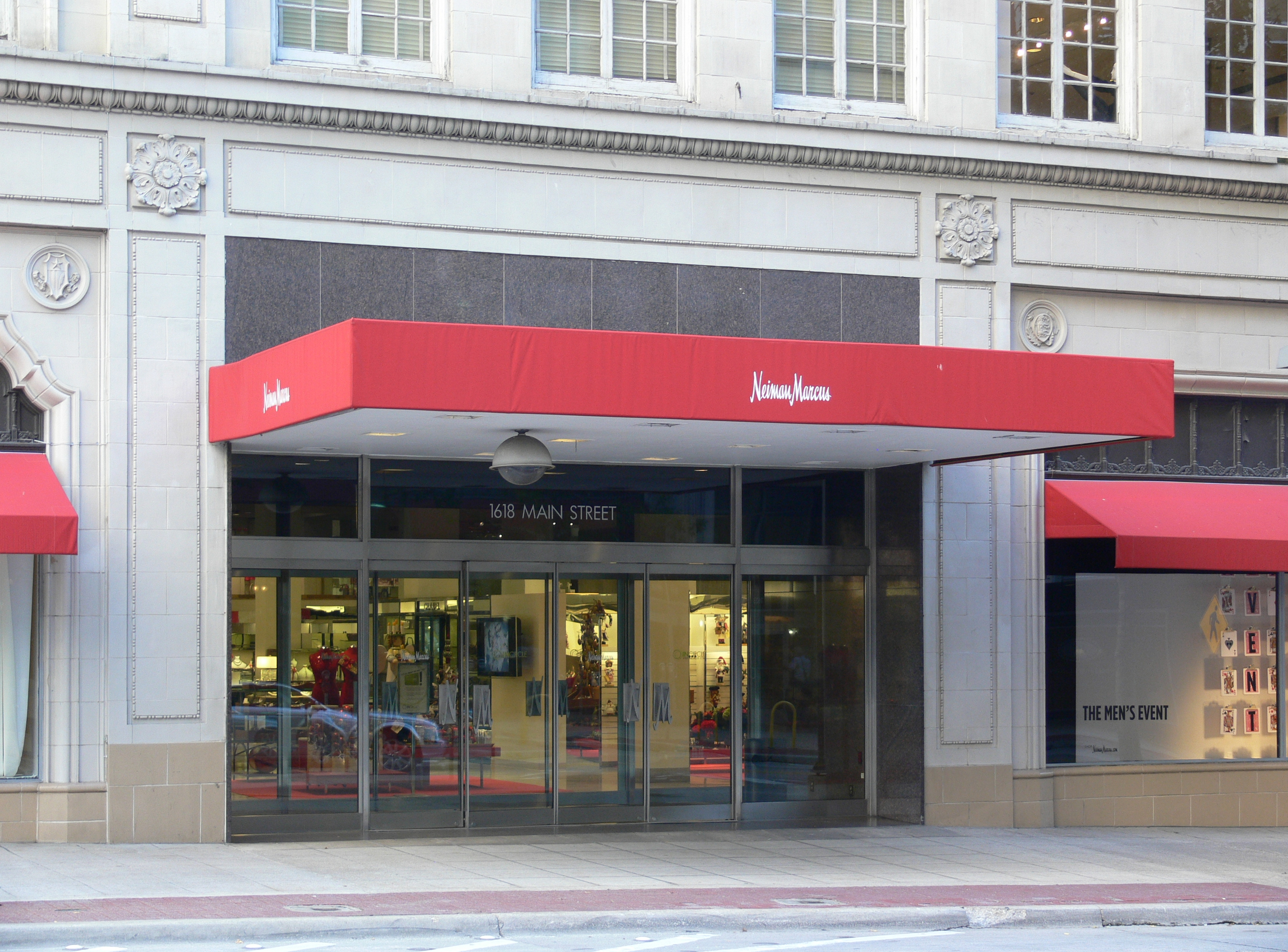

Dale T. Smith is a collector of Neiman Marcus memorabilia and was the last to purchase an item at the former Neiman Marcus flagship location in Downtown Dallas.

== See also ==
- National Register of Historic Places listings in Dallas County, Texas
