= Yavneh Academy =

Yavneh Academy may refer to:

- Yavneh Academy (New Jersey) - Paramus, New Jersey
- Yavneh Academy of Dallas
- Yavneh Day School/Yavneh Hebrew Academy - Los Angeles
