= Sandfield =

Sandfield may refer to:

- Max M. Sandfield (1903–1994), American architect
- Sandfield, Nova Scotia, Canada
- Sandfield, Ontario, Canada
- Sandfield Road, Headington, Oxford, England

== See also ==
- Sandfields (disambiguation)
