= Joe Allen Hong =

American fashion designer (1930–2004)

- Born: November 28, 1930; El Paso, Texas, U.S.
- Died: February 28, 2004 (aged 73); San Francisco, California, U.S.
- Occupation: Clothing designer for Neiman Marcus

Joe Allen Hong (November 28, 1930 – February 28, 2004) was an American fashion designer.

== Biography ==
Hong was born in El Paso, Texas to immigrant parents—a Chinese father, Joseph Hong, and a Mexican mother, Refugio (Ruth) Pedrueza Lugo. His family moved to California's Central Valley where he graduated from Stockton High School in 1948. He attended California College of Arts and Crafts. He served in the United States Army until December 1955 and was stationed at Fort Bliss in Texas.

In 1956, Hong became a fashion designer for the growing department store chain Neiman Marcus. For his first major professional assignment Lawrence Marcus asked him to compete in the contest to design Grace Kelly's bridesmaids' gowns for her marriage to Rainier III, Prince of Monaco. Marcus scouted Monaco's Saint Nicholas Cathedral in a prenuptial visit and provided ideas based upon the building's architecture, decor, and general surroundings, which Hong then worked into the winning design. At only 22 years of age, Grace Kelly chose him to design her bridesmaid's dresses. The bridesmaids carried bouquets of pale pink tea roses. Their gowns were designed by Joseph Hong of Neiman Marcus and were made by Priscilla of Boston. The dresses were made in the bride’s favorite color~ pale yellow (referred to as “sunlight”). The top layer of the gown was fashioned from sheer silk organdy and featured a high-necked collar and full bishop sleeves. The fitted bodice had a pleated sash and full skirt that flowed into a short train. The organdy gown was layered over a strapless silk taffeta underdress. The simple bonnet of yellow silk organdy was designed by Joseph Hong and made by Don Marshall. The four flower girls carried a bouquet of daisies. Their dresses were also designed by Joseph Hong and made by Formals by Mary Carter. The top layer was made of white cotton organdy and featured white and yellow daisies that were machine embroidered with silk thread. The dress had sweet puffed sleeves and a collar that was similar in style to the bridesmaid gowns. The underskirt was made of yellow silk taffeta. A simple wreath of daisies was worn as a headpiece.

The Philadelphia Museum of Art exhibited these beautiful gowns in 2006 during "Grace Kelly: Icon of Style to Royal Bride".

Hong never married and eventually settled in San Francisco, California. His design projects extended far beyond clothing and included posters for the San Francisco Zoo as well as gift boxes for Joseph Magnin Co. Friends said his love of San Francisco and the Italian-influenced North Beach neighborhood was reflected in his art.

He also illustrated Helen Corbitt's Cookbook published on January 1, 1957.

At his death in 2004, he was survived by three brothers and a sister.
