= Ruth Kahn =

Ruth Kahn may refer to:

- Ruth Ward Kahn, Jewish American lecturer and writer
- Ruth Brown Kahn, American civic leader in Dallas, Texas
