= Minnie Lichtenstein Marcus =

American businesswoman (1882–1979)

- Born: Minnie Lichtenstein; October 4, 1882; Dallas, Texas, U.S.
- Died: December 5, 1979 (aged 97); Dallas, Texas, U.S.
- Occupation: Vice President of Horticulture for Neiman Marcus
- Spouse(s): Herbert Marcus, (married 1902)
- Children: Stanley Marcus, Edward, Herbert Jr., Lawrence Marcus

Minnie Lichtenstein Marcus (October 4, 1882 – December 5, 1979) was an American businesswoman who was CEO of department store Neiman Marcus, co-founded by her husband Herbert Marcus.

== Biography ==
Born as Minnie Liechtenstein in Dallas, Texas, her father Meyer Lichtenstein had emigrated from Königsberg, Germany, whilst her mother Hattie Mittenthal had come from Russia via Peoria, Illinois. She married Herbert Marcus in 1902 and gave birth to the first of their four sons, Stanley Marcus, in 1905.

The Marcus family and the newly married Carrie Marcus Neiman and Abraham Lincoln Neiman, who were her sister in law and her husband then moved to Atlanta, Georgia to do sales promotion work. The Coca-Cola Company and other clients brought in substantial income but Minnie and others became homesick for Dallas. The Neiman and Marcus families relinquished sales territories in the nascent soft drink concern for $25,000 which they used to found Neiman Marcus, which initially specialized in ready-to-wear women's finery, in Dallas in 1907.

Minnie gave birth to her subsequent three sons, Edward, Herbert Jr., and Lawrence, in roughly four year intervals. In 1928, she and her husband took an extensive trip to Europe while her son Stanley worked with Mr. Neiman and an expanding group of employees in the constantly growing enterprise. After their return, they discovered that her son Stanley and A. L. Neiman had clashed on many issues and that Carrie had been told first hand about her husband's marital infidelities. Minnie's sister in law asked for a divorce and Herbert officially made a decision to take a loan to buy out the Neiman share for $250,000 in return for Mr. Neiman being legally barred from competing with Neiman Marcus in Dallas in the future.

The World War II years brought duties to Neiman Marcus the store as rationing and other realities set in and to Minnie's sons via the Selective Service System and other government programs. Lawrence was injured in Africa and Stanley joined the War Production Board to help the war efforts with his knowledge about clothing and business in general.

Her husband, Herbert, died in December 1950, and his sister, Carrie in March 1953 leaving Stanley as CEO and her younger sons as other executives of the expanding retail chain. She officially became Vice President in charge of horticulture for Neiman Marcus and she attended many events such as art and fashion shows and the opening of the Houston Galleria Neiman Marcus as the chain expanded outside of Dallas.

Stanley and others negotiated a merger of Neiman Marcus with California based Broadway-Hale in 1969 and Neiman Marcus began expanding outside of Texas. Marcus family members then had somewhat less influence at the stores but her grandson Richard Marcus did become CEO of Neiman Marcus stores too. Minnie helped Stanley write books, was made an honorary lifetime president of the Dallas Garden Center (now renamed Texas Discovery Gardens), helped many Jewish and interfaith organizations and even donated land to Dallas Taping for the Blind before her death in 1979.
