= Mesorah High School for Girls =

Parochial high school in Dallas, Texas, US

Coordinates: 32.9210°N 96.7762°W

Mesorah High School for Girls is a private Orthodox Jewish high school for girls in Dallas, Texas.

Scheduled to open in August 2000 with grades 9 and 10, it was the first Jewish girls' high school in the city and the third all-girls' school in Dallas. It is the only Jewish girls' high school in the Southwestern United States. It initially had seven students.

As of 2000 the school uniforms include ankle-length skirts and long-sleeved shirts. The school teaches Jewish religious subjects and secular subjects.

== See also ==
- History of the Jews in Dallas
- Hockaday School for Girls
- Ursuline Academy of Dallas
