= Bill Wisener =

American businessperson (1944–2020)

- Wisener in 2015
- Born: William Turner Wisener; April 17, 1944; Jacksonville, Texas, U.S.
- Died: January 11, 2020 (aged 75); Dallas, Texas, U.S.

William Turner Wisener (April 17, 1944 – January 11, 2020) was an American businessman. He was known as a music icon, having owned Bill's Records and Tapes, a record store in Dallas, Texas, for almost fifty years. He began selling items at a flea market in the late 1970s before opening his first store in Dallas in 1979.

== Early life ==
Wisener was born in 1944, in Jacksonville, Texas, to William Turner Wisener Sr. and Clydelle Smelser. Wisener's father served in World War II, so first-born Wisener was raised by his mother and maternal grandmother for the first few years of his life. A brother, Randy, was born in 1949.

He studied at Southern Methodist University briefly, before graduating from North Texas State University. He later attained a master's degree, the studying for which allowed him to miss serving in Vietnam. Prior to leaving education, he built a high-end miniature-golf course on Buckner Boulevard in Dallas, but did not enjoy it because he was unable to spend time talking to his customers.

== Career ==
In the late 1970s, Wisener began selling items at a flea market in Vikon Village, Garland, Texas, where he lived with his mother. (His mother had set up a booth at the flea market in the early 1970s.) As his customer base grew, he expanded to nineteen booths. He opened a store on McKinney Avenue and Routh Street in Dallas, then on Greenville Avenue in Lower Greenville in 1979.

He opened Bill's Records and Tapes in 1981, located in North Dallas's Northwood Hills Shopping Center, a property owned by former Dallas mayor Robert Folsom. The store later moved to the Cedars neighborhood.

Music artists, such as American singer-songwriters Ben Harper and Elliott Smith, shopped at Wisener's store before or after shows in the city. Harper once spent the night there, which led to him and Wisener spending a week together in Paris. In 1998, British band Radiohead spent four hours in the store. The band gave Wisener and his employees the entire second row of seats at their sold-out show at the Music Hall at Fair Park that night. Stevie Wonder and The Cure telephoned the store to speak to Wisener. Jerry Haynes was also a regular customer. Stanley Marcus gave Wisener his collection of 78s.

At its peak, Bill's Records was the largest mom-and-pop store in the United States, according to Billboard. He kept around 15% of his overall inventory of roughly 7,000 boxes of records on the floor. The rest was in storage.

In late 2001, business at the store began to reduce to roughly half what he was making in its 1990s heyday. It then dropped to around 15% of its peak. Wisener blamed the evolution of the internet. After 26 years in the Cedars, in 2007 he downsized to a new (and final) location, at 1317 South Lamar Street in Spring Valley Village, because he was losing thousands of dollars each month, not least because his warehouse storage rent was $2,600. Jack Matthews, the landlord at his new location, let Wisener stay even though he could not make rent. By 2011, Wisener was selling his products on eBay. "I had to begin to realize it was never going to be the way it used to be," he said.

Wisener never put a price sticker on his products; he decided the cost to the customer at the register.

== Personal life ==
Wisener's mother died in 1996, aged 77, after which Wisener became somewhat reclusive and began periodically staying overnight at his store because, according to a former employee, he did not want to go home to an empty house. His father died in 1982, aged 61. Wisener became a heavy drinker and a chain smoker, and drank several bottles of Diet Coke each day, having become tee-total in 2003.

== Death ==
Wisener died on January 11, 2020, aged 75, after a long illness. He was found unresponsive in his chair at his store by a customer. A wake was held at the Kessler Theater in Dallas the following day. He was interred in Restland Memorial Park in Dallas.

Bill's Records and Tapes was purchased by the owners of Josey Records.

=== Legacy ===
In 2023, an art installation was unveiled in Dallas in honor of Wisener, whose portrait was the centerpiece.
