= Lawrence Marcus =

American businessman (1917–2013)

- Marcus in 2010
- Born: July 5, 1917; Dallas, Texas, U.S.
- Died: November 1, 2013 (aged 96); Dallas, Texas, U.S.
- Education: Harvard University (BA & MBA)
- Occupation: VP of Women's Department at Neiman Marcus
- Spouse: Shelby Marcus
- Parent(s): Herbert Marcus; Minnie Lichtenstein Marcus

Lawrence Marcus (July 5, 1917 – November 1, 2013) was the fourth and youngest child in a prominent Jewish family that includes his father Neiman Marcus Department Store cofounder Herbert Marcus, his mother Minnie Lichtenstein Marcus and also his eldest brother, Stanley Marcus, who went on to become the long-time Neiman Marcus CEO and Chairman.

== Biography ==
After graduating from Dallas' Texas Country Day (the precursor to St. Mark's School of Texas), Marcus received his bachelors degree and MBA at Harvard University.

During World War II, he was a Lieutenant in the 601st Tank Destroyer Battalion but had to be medically evacuated after a Stuka dive bomber dropped a bomb near his M3 Gun Motor Carriage during the Battle of El Guettar. He sustained three shrapnel wounds: one above his heart, one in the abdomen, and one which destroyed his left tricep. For his efforts, Marcus was awarded two Croix de Guerre by the French government. He retired from the military as a captain.

Upon his return to Dallas, Texas, he resumed his career in the growing family business and he became VP of the Women's Department.

In the 1950s, Lawrence's brother Stanley asked him to assist in a contest to design the bridesmaid outfits for the wedding of Grace Kelly to Rainier III, Prince of Monaco. He worked closely with fashion designer Joe Allen Hong to come up with ideas and strategies for winning the contest. Lawrence flew to Monaco to scout the location of the wedding at Saint Nicholas Cathedral to give Hong as many ideas and leads as possible. The winning design was submitted by Hong and since he was considered a minority of Mexican and Chinese descent Neiman Marcus further burnished its image of being a multicultural friendly concern.

As Neiman Marcus outgrew Dallas in the 1950s and then Texas in the 1970s, family ownership was diluted and Stanley ceased to be active in day-to-day operations. Lawrence continued to work as a VP and other family members in the next generation such as Stanley's son Richard Marcus worked from time to time in varying roles. In 2005 Neiman Marcus was taken private by TPG Capital and Warburg Pincus and family ownership ceased. Lawrence attended the 100th anniversary celebration of Neiman Marcus' founding in 2007 and told stories about his brothers and other family members.

On November 1, 2013, he died at UT Southwestern-St. Paul University Hospital. He was survived by his wife, Shelby Marcus; his children, Judy Marcus Horn and Cary Shel Marcus; and his step-children: James Stroope, Jr., Tinna Stroope, and Lisa Browning.

== See also ==
- Notable alumni of St. Mark's School of Texas
