= Texas Jewish Post =

Newspaper in Dallas-Fort Worth, US

- Type: Weekly newspaper
- Publisher: Sharon Wisch-Ray
- Founded: 1947
- Headquarters: 7920 Beltline Rd. Ste. 680 Dallas, TX 75254-8150
- Circulation: 2,279 (as of 2023)
- Website: tjpnews.com

The Texas Jewish Post (TJP) is a weekly community newspaper serving the Jewish community of the Dallas-Fort Worth area since 1947.

== History ==
The Texas Jewish Post was conceived in mid-1946 by Jimmy and Rene Wisch, who were both working for the U.S. government at the time. They became active publishers and editors of the newspaper in 1947. The Wisch family has published the TJP since its inception.

The TJP represented the Jewish press during talks between President Lyndon B. Johnson and Israeli Prime Minister Levi Eshkol in Texas in 1968 and was the only Jewish newspaper invited to the Moscow Summit between U.S. President Richard Nixon and Soviet General Secretary Leonid Brezhnev in the Soviet Union in 1972.

== Reporting ==
The TJP runs wire reporting from the Jewish Telegraphic Agency and the Associated Press. The TJP's own correspondents contributed coverage from Washington, D.C., and Israel.

== Editorial ==
The TJP supported Zionism, and subscribers represented a broad range of Jewish congregations, organizations, agencies, and enterprises within the circulation area. The paper sought to reach beyond Fort Worth in coverage and circulation, and to communicate Jewish concerns to gentiles as well as the Jewish community. Post subscribers and advertisers included non-Jews."

== See also ==
- History of the Jews in Dallas, Texas
