= Sandfields =

Sandfields may refer to:

- Sandfields, Swansea
- Sandfields, Port Talbot
- Sandfields, a suburb in the city of Lichfield, Staffordshire

== See also ==
- Sandfield (disambiguation)
