= Restland Memorial Park =

Cemetery in Dallas County, Texas

Coordinates: 32°55′41″N 96°44′31″W

Restland Memorial Park is a cemetery located in an unincorporated area of Dallas County, Texas between Dallas and Richardson, that was established in 1925. It is the final resting place of many prominent figures in the Dallas area, including politicians and professional athletes, and Charles Elmer Doolin, inventor of the Frito corn chip and founder of the predecessor of Frito-Lay Inc.

It is located on 13005 Greenville Avenue, Dallas, Texas 75243 North of I635 at Hwy 75, near Richland College.

== Notable burials ==
- Heinz Becker – first baseman for the Chicago Cubs and Cleveland Indians in the 1940s
- William Arvis Blakley – former U.S. senator from Texas
- Bill Boyd – actor and C&W musician
- David Browning – Olympic diver
- Earle Cabell – former mayor of Dallas, U.S. Representative
- Tom Campbell Clark – US Supreme Court Justice
- James Mitchell Collins – former United States Representative for the 3rd Congressional District of Texas (1968–1983)
- Patrick Cranshaw – actor
- Mike Gaechter – defensive back for the Dallas Cowboys in the 1960s
- Salvador Gliatto – MLB pitcher
- Ed Gossett – US Congressman
- Jerry Gray – arranger, composer, and conductor
- Willie Hutch – singer and songwriter
- Hattie Leah Henenberg – lawyer, member of the All-Woman Supreme Court of 1925
- Sam Johnson – former United States Representative for the 3rd Congressional District of Texas (1991–2019)
- Nathalie Krassovska – dancer for Ballet Russe de Monte-Carlo and Director for Krassovska Ballet Jeunesse, Dallas
- Frank Lane – MLB executive
- Conrad Lau – aeronautical engineer, inventor, executive
- Herman Lay – businessman
- Jim Levey – early 1930s Major League shortstop
- D. D. Lewis - professional football player
- Bronko Lubich – wrestler and referee
- Harvey Martin – defensive end for the Dallas Cowboys in the 1970s and 1980s
- Jerry Mays – football defensive tackle
- Norm McRae – BLP pitcher
- Justin Mentell – artist and actor
- Ray Morehart – MLB infielder
- Ray Price – country-pop singer
- Jethro Pugh – football pro tackle
- Steve Ramsey – football quarterback
- Russell A. Steindam – US Army officer and Medal of Honor recipient
- Tex Schramm – NFL executive
- Robert L. Thornton – businessman and Mayor of Dallas
- Texie Waterman – choreographer for the Dallas Cowboys Cheerleaders
- Bill Weber – founding pastor of Prestonwood Baptist Church
- Bill Wisener – record store owner
- Ron Woodroof – AIDS victim and creator of The Dallas Buyers Club

== See also ==
- List of burial places of justices of the Supreme Court of the United States
