= Ruth Brown Kahn =

Ruth Brown Kahn (June 21, 1902 - April 9, 1987) was an American civic leader in Dallas, Texas. Kahn co-founded the Dallas Jewish Archives, which later became the Dallas Jewish Historical Society or DJHS.

== Biography ==
Kahn was born on June 21, 1902, in St. Louis, Missouri, but grew up near Eufaula in Oklahoma Territory. She graduated from the University of Chicago in 1923 and in that same year, moved to Dallas, where she became involved in local Jewish community organizations. She married Louis J. Hexter, an attorney, in 1923, and together they had two children before they divorced. She married Laurence S. Kahn in 1936.

Kahn and Ginger Chesnick Jacobs were inspired to preserve local Jewish history when the early building of Temple Emanu-El was demolished. The synagogue, destroyed in 1970, was the last remaining Jewish institution in South Dallas. Kahn and Jacobs eventually housed the archives in the Dallas Jewish Community Center in 1978.

Kahn died in Dallas on April 9, 1987.
