= Abraham Lincoln Neiman =

American businessman (1875–1970)

- Born: July 4, 1875; Pittsburgh, Pennsylvania, US
- Died: October 21, 1970 (aged 95); Arlington, Texas, US
- Known for: Co-founder of department store Neiman Marcus
- Spouses: Carrie Marcus Neiman (1905–1928; divorce – his admission of infidelity); Dorothy Squire (1938–1962; her death from cancer)
- Children: 2

Abraham Lincoln "Al" Neiman (July 4, 1875 – October 21, 1970) was an American businessman, who was a co-founder of department store chain Neiman Marcus.

== Biography ==
Neiman, born in July 1875, was raised in a Jewish orphanage in Cleveland, Ohio. He met his first wife, Carrie Marcus Neiman, in Dallas, Texas while they were working at A. Harris & Company. They married in 1905 and moved to Atlanta, Georgia with Carrie's brother and sister-in-law, Herbert Marcus and Minnie Lichtenstein Marcus, to work in sales promotion.

The Coca-Cola Company is known as their most notable client although, at the time, they were not enthusiastic about its future. Therefore, they relinquished rights to sales territories of the nascent soft drink concern for $25,000 which the Neiman and Marcus families used to open Neiman Marcus in Dallas in 1907.

Abraham became the broker and promoter for the specialty ready-to-wear ladies fine clothing shop. At the time, most ladies of means traveled to New York City and even Europe for custom tailoring. He traveled widely as well to ensure Neiman Marcus could bring the best clothing money could buy to Dallas from New York and elsewhere.

When the store burned down in 1913, New York investors with whom he was familiar helped to rebuild it. In the 1920s, his nephew, Stanley Marcus, left Harvard Business School to work at Neiman Marcus. Their personalities often clashed which added to the tensions he already felt with the large and successful Marcus family. In 1928, he admitted to ongoing infidelity to his wife, Carrie. They divorced and Herbert bought out Al's share for $250,000 on the condition that he couldn't legally compete with Neiman Marcus in Dallas.

During the remainder of his life, he often lived in New York and Chicago. In Chicago, he worked at Henry C. Lytton & Co. He married Dorothy Squire, a fashion model, in 1938 and they adopted World War II refugees Diana and Ursula Woolf after discovering they were unable to have their own children. As he aged, he became well known for his extravagant spending habits while at the same time developing a reputation for sloppy business practices. Dorothy died suddenly of cancer in 1962. Abraham, now penniless, returned to Dallas. His former nephew, Stanley Marcus, visited him at a Masonic home in Arlington, Texas, in October 1970, fearing few others would before his death.
