= Henry C. Lytton & Co. =

Department store chain in Chicago, IL

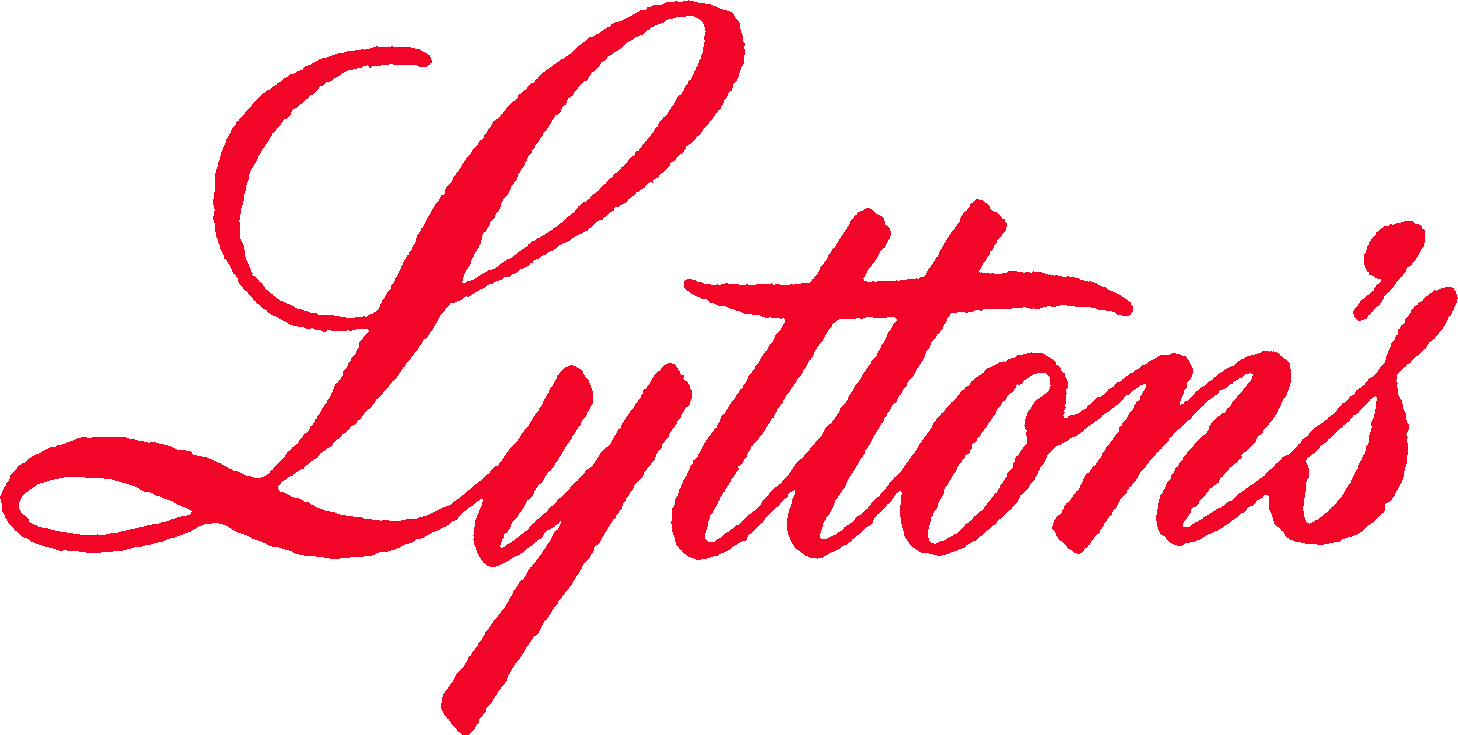
Lytton's logo

Henry C. Lytton & Co., nicknamed The Hub and Lytton's, was a department store chain headquartered in Chicago, Illinois, United States. The first store opened on State Street in 1887 and the last store closed in 1986.

== History ==
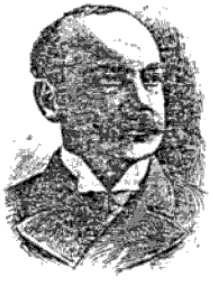
Henry Charles Lytton

Henry Charles Lytton first opened a store in Ionia, Michigan, but it proved unprofitable. Later forays in Grand Rapids, Michigan and Indianapolis, Indiana provided Lytton with enough capital to open a store in the Loop neighborhood of Chicago. The store, which he nicknamed The Hub, opened in 1887 on the corner of Jackson and State Streets in the Otis Building. It specialized in mass-produced menswear, a rarity at the time.

In 1913, the store moved across the street into a new eighteen-story skyscraper known as the Lytton Store Building. Designed by Marshall & Fox, The Hub used the lower eight floors and both basements. The store then began to sell sporting goods. Lytton retired in 1917 and his son George took over. Henry would return to the head of the company in 1933 when George died. In 1934, Lytton opened a store at the Century of Progress world's fair. By the late 1930s, The Hub had branches in Evanston, Illinois; Oak Park, Illinois; and Gary, Indiana. The company grossed $19 million (~$226 million in 2023) in 1946. Also that year, the company name was officially changed to Henry C. Lytton & Co. to commemorate Lytton's 100th birthday. Lytton remained president until his death in 1949 at age 102.

The chain was purchased by Thomas Raffery, the former head of Venture Stores, and Matthew Kallman, formerly of Stix Baer & Fuller, in 1983. The firm, then consisting of twelve stores, went bankrupt the next March. Nine of its branches were then dissolved to raise money to maintain the flagship store on State Street. The company went out of business in 1986. Wieboldt's, another Chicago department store chain bought the Lytton's name as well as their remaining inventory. They had planned to relaunch Lytton's but never happened as Wieboldt's also filed for bankruptcy and subsequently ceased operation in 1987. The store building is now owned and used by DePaul University and is part of the Loop Retail Historic District.
