= Herbert Marcus =

Co-founder and CEO of Neiman-Marcus (1878–1950)

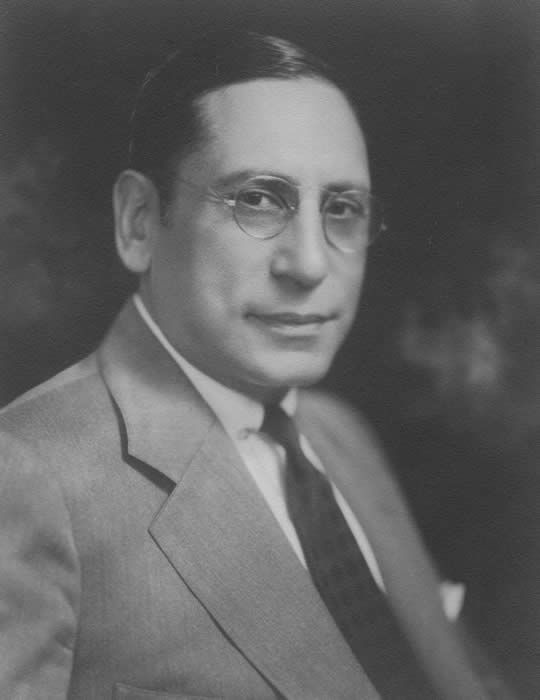
- Marcus circa 1920s
- Born: September 6, 1878; Louisville, Kentucky, U.S.
- Died: December 11, 1950 (aged 72); Dallas, Texas, U.S.
- Occupations: Co-founder and then CEO of Neiman Marcus
- Spouse: Minnie Lichtenstein Marcus
- Children: 4, including Stanley and Lawrence

Herbert Marcus (September 6, 1878 – December 11, 1950) was one of the co-founders of Neiman Marcus, and later became its chief executive officer.

== Biography ==
Herbert was born to a Jewish family in Louisville, Kentucky. He dropped out of high school to move to Hillsboro, Texas to work and live near his brother Theodore, his three sisters and his parents. His various retail, sales and janitorial positions helped him escape the economic hardships of life in Kentucky. In 1899, Herbert moved to Dallas, Texas. He married Minnie Lichtenstein in 1902. They had four sons. Then, Herbert moved his family to Atlanta, Georgia in order to work with his sister Carrie and her husband Abraham Lincoln Neiman at The Coca-Cola Company. Their success was rewarded with a buyout of $25,000 in exchange for giving up the sales territories in Kansas and or Missouri of the nascent soft drink concern. This $25,000 enabled the Neiman and Marcus families to establish Neiman Marcus in Dallas in 1907.

Neiman-Marcus specialized in readymade high-quality clothes for women at a time when visiting a tailor and or doing extensive alterations at home was the norm. Business grew quickly as cotton and later oil and other industries and population growth buoyed the Texas economy. In 1928 his sister Carrie divorced A. L. Neiman, Herbert bought out Neiman's share, and Neiman-Marcus came entirely under Marcus family control. Herbert became president of Temple Emanu-El in Dallas, was a director of the Dallas Museum of Art and held many other civic positions to bolster the culture and well-being of the city that made Neiman-Marcus thrive. The Marcus family negotiated with Condé Nast of Condé Nast Publications and Neiman-Marcus became the first concern located West of the Atlantic Seaboard to advertise luxury fashion in their magazines.

During World War II Herbert and the Marcus family and employees helped Neiman-Marcus showcase clothing and lifestyles that would be most helpful with regards to rationing and other wartime realities. The post war years brought more lavish fashion shows and finery into Neiman-Marcus as luxury goods became fashionable again. Carrie Marcus Neiman and Herbert's sons took increasing responsibility for both fashion and business decisions as Herbert aged. After Herbert's death in 1950, his sister Carrie became chairman of the board of directors of the company, and his son Stanley Marcus became president and chief executive officer.

At one time Marcus lived in the Lakewood neighborhood in Dallas.
