= Akiba Yavneh Academy =

Jewish private school in Dallas, Texas

Coordinates: 32.9159°N 96.7717°W

Akiba Yavneh Academy, formerly Yavneh Academy of Dallas, is a coeducational college preparatory Jewish private school in Dallas, Texas. It is guided by the tenets of Modern Orthodox Judaism. In 2019, Yavneh Academy merged with Akiba Academy of Dallas (preschool through grade 8) to become Akiba Yavneh Academy (preschool through 12th Grade). With a student body of more than 400 students from 3 months of age through 12th Grade in the 2022–23 academic year, Akiba Yavneh Academy has a dual curriculum of General and Judaic Studies.

== History ==
Yavneh Academy of Dallas first opened in 1993. Yavneh was named after a now-defunct Jewish school in Cologne, Germany that closed during World War II, which itself was named for an ancient city and academy in Israel. It was Dallas's first Jewish high school, following the closing of Torah High School of Texas. When it first opened, Yavneh taught 9th and 10th grade, phasing in two other grades in subsequent years. Rabbi Moshe Englander, who was previously the assistant principal of a Jewish high school near Detroit, was the first principal. When the school opened, the yearly tuition was $7,000. However, this was not enough to fully finance the school’s operation, and the school used donations to cover some of its expenses. Initially, it had about 12 students. By 2004, it had 81 students, rising to about 100 in 2005.

Yavneh Academy occupied five temporary locations before settling into its permanent home, The Schultz Rosenberg Campus, named after donors Howard and Leslie Schultz and Marcus and Ann Rosenberg. The school's current campus is at 12324 Merit Drive, covering 3.8 acres (1.5 ha). It shares a site with the campus of Akiba Academy, a PK-8 school. The merged campus opened its doors in 2005. The site formerly housed the Olla Podrida Shopping Village, a shopping center which closed in 1996. The Schultzes had acquired the site and transferred it to the Greater Dallas Jewish Community Capital Campaign of the 21st Century as a donation. The demolition of the shopping center was scheduled to occur in 2003, with construction of the new campuses scheduled to begin in January of the following year.

The school, along with Akiba Academy of Dallas, was built with a $19 million bond issued by the Colorado Educational and Cultural Facilities Authority (CEFCA) and underwritten by J.P. Morgan Securities Inc. On September 27, 2004, about 36 boxes of Jewish religious books were ceremonially buried at the school site.

Donald R. O'Quinn served as principal of the school from 1998 to 2012. Dr. David A. Portnoy became Head of School in 2012 after serving as Head of School at Emery/Weiner School in Houston, Texas, and as a teacher and senior administrator at Beth Tfiloh Dahan Community School and Gilman School, both in Baltimore, Maryland. Following Dr. Portnoy's retirement in 2019, the school merged with Akiba Academy of Dallas to become Akiba Yavneh Academy. In 2019-22, the Head of School was Rabbi Yaakov Green.Then, in 2023, Jason Feld became the new Head of School until 2025

== Athletics and extracurricular activities ==
In 2016 and 2017, the Yavneh Boys Varsity Basketball Team, The Bulldogs, won back-to-back championships at the Beth Tfiloh Weiner International Invitational Basketball Tournament. They also enjoyed a perfect 31–0 record in the 2017–18 season. In 2020, they won the Texas State TAPPS 3-A Championship.

In 2012, Yavneh's student newspaper, The Bulldog Print, was awarded “Best in Show” for broadsheet 13- to 16-page newspapers during the National High School Journalism Conference in San Antonio, Texas. Its engineering team, under the auspices of CIJE, was also awarded top national honors in 2017. The school's math team won first place at the JKHA Math Masters Tournament in 2019 and 2023, with several students also placing individually as well.

Akiba Yavneh offers several extracurricular opportunities, including a music ensemble, a mock trial team, a student newspaper, and various other student clubs. They also run an annual Jewish summer camp called Camp Kulanu.

== College admissions, academics, and alumni ==
Yavneh alumni have attended Yale University, Harvard University, Stanford University, The University of Pennsylvania, and many other colleges, universities, and yeshiva and seminary programs in Israel and around the world.

== See also ==
- History of the Jews in Dallas
