= Max M. Sandfield =

American architect, sculptor, and artist

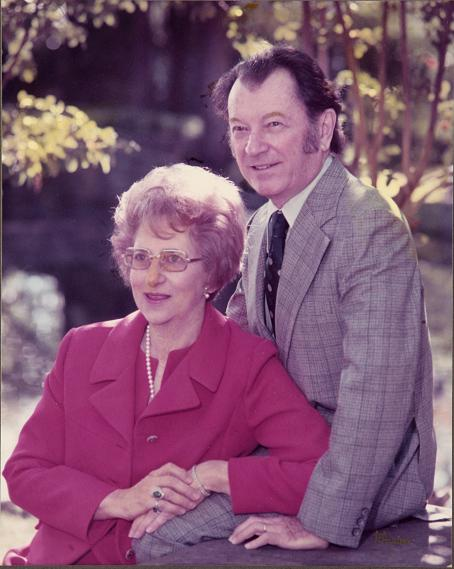
Max M. Sandfield with wife Carol Wiener Sandfield.

Max M. Sandfield (January 28, 1903 – April 12, 1994) was an architect, sculptor, and artist.

== Life ==
Born in the Russian Empire, Sandfield immigrated to the United States as an infant and was raised in San Antonio. He graduated from MIT in 1925 with a bachelor's degree in architecture. In April 1944 he met Carol Wiener, whom he married three months later. They had five children together: Norman, Joan, Robert, Carol Lynn and Byron.

== Architecture ==
Sandfield was part of a team of architects in Dallas, including Howard R. Meyer and William W. Wurster, that built Temple Emanu-el in 1957. The synagogue was recognized by the American Institute of Architects with a Twenty-five Year Award for its enduring merit. Sandfield for a time was president of the Dallas Chapter of AIA.
