= Temple Emanu-El (Dallas) =

First Reform Jewish congregation in North Texas

- Location in Texas

Religion
- Affiliation: Reform Judaism
- Ecclesiastical or organizational status: Synagogue
- Leadership: Rabbi David E. Stern; Rabbi Debra J. Robbins; Rabbi Kimberly Herzog Cohen; Rabbi Michael Lewis; Rabbi Amy Rossel
- Status: Active

Location
- Location: 8500 Hillcrest Road, Dallas, North Texas 75225
- Country: United States
- Interactive map of Temple Emanu-El
- Coordinates: 32°52′03″N 96°47′07″W

Architecture
- Architects: South Boulevard: Hubbel and Greene; Hillcrest Road: Howard R. Meyer; Max M. Sandfield; William Wurster (consultant)
- Established: 1875 (as a congregation)
- Completed: 1876 (Commerce Street); 1899 (Ervay Street); 1917 (South Boulevard); 1957 (Hillcrest Road)

Website
- tedallas.org

Temple Emanu-El is a Reform Jewish synagogue located at 8500 Hillcrest Road, in Dallas, Texas, in the United States. Chartered as the Jewish Congregation Emanu-El in 1875, it was the first Reform congregation in North Texas, and is the largest synagogue in the South.

The congregation is led by Rabbi David E. Stern.

== History ==
Temple Emanu-El of Dallas was founded in 1873 and chartered in 1875. It was renamed from the Jewish Congregation Emanu-El to Temple Emanu-El Congregation in 1974. The small but growing Jewish community sought a permanent religious structure, and wanted a rabbi to conduct services and offer religious education for children, so several families formed Congregation Emanu-El. They elected David Goslin president; Philip Sanger vice president; Emanuel Tillman treasurer; H. Regensburger secretary; and Alexander Sanger, August Israelsky, and Henry Loeb trustees. The next year, they built a small red brick temple in the Byzantine style at Commerce and Church (now Field) streets in downtown Dallas. The congregation engaged its first rabbi, Aaron Suhler, in 1875, and joined the Union of American Hebrew Congregations in 1906.

In 1957, the temple moved to its present location in North Dallas. Architects Howard R. Meyer and Max M. Sandfield, with noted California architect William Wurster as consultant, received an Award of Merit from the American Institute of Architects for the design of the present structure, which was enhanced by art coordinator György Kepes of the Massachusetts Institute of Technology.

== Locations ==
Temple Emanu-El has had four locations in its history:

- Commerce Street (1876–1898)
- Ervay Street (1899–1917)
- South Boulevard (1917–1956)
- Hillcrest Road (1957–present)

== Clergy ==
Past Temple Emanu-El senior rabbis include:

- Rabbi Joseph Silverman (1884–1885)
- Rabbi George Alexander Kohut (1897–1900)
- Rabbi William Greenburg
- Rabbi David Lefkowitz (1920–1949)
- Rabbi Levi Olan (1948–1970)
- Rabbi Gerald J. Klein (1952–2007)
- Rabbi Jack Bemporad
- Rabbi Sheldon Zimmerman
- Rabbi Charles Mintz (interim senior)

== Music ==
Temple Emanu-El is nationally renowned for its music programs. Samuel Adler. as music director from 1953 until 1966. created many of the Temple's early musical offerings including their extensive volunteer adult and children's choirs. Simon Sargon expanded the choir's influence and created programs such as the Showcase Series (showcasing jazz, classical, and pops musicians).

== Notable members ==
- Hattie Leah Henenberg, lawyer and jurist

== See also ==
- History of the Jews in Dallas, Texas
- Jewish Texan
