= Carrie Marcus Neiman =

American businesswoman (1883–1953)

- Born: Carrie Marcus; May 3, 1883; Louisville, Kentucky, US
- Died: March 6, 1953 (aged 69); Dallas, Texas, US
- Occupations: Co-founder and chair, Neiman Marcus
- Spouse: Abraham Lincoln Neiman (1905–1928; divorced)

Carrie Marcus Neiman (May 3, 1883 – March 6, 1953) was an American businesswoman and one of the co-founders of Neiman Marcus, a luxury department store.

== Early life ==
Carrie Marcus was born in Louisville, Kentucky to German-Jewish immigrants Delia (Bloomfield) and Jacob Marcus. Jacob was a cotton broker, a fairly common occupation in the South. In 1895, the family moved to Hillsboro, Texas. Carrie did not receive a formal education but was educated at home in a European milieu, reading German newspapers and studying European fashion magazines. In 1899, she followed her older siblings to Dallas, where she worked as a saleswoman at A. Harris and Company, a local department store, and became a top salesgirl.

She met Abraham Lincoln "Al" Neiman in Dallas, and they married shortly after, on April 25, 1905. She joined her husband, her brother Herbert, and his wife Minnie in a sales promotion business—the Neiman-Marcus Sales Firm—based in Atlanta, Georgia. Their success brought them a choice: accept a buyout from a local merchant, or promote a new (and risky) product, Coca-Cola. The family sold their business for $25,000 and returned to Dallas in 1907 to start an entirely new type of business.

== Neiman Marcus ==
In the early 1900s, most women with money went to dressmakers, and many Texans traveled to New York, or even Europe, to find the best seamstresses and the most contemporary styles. Carrie, Al, Herbert, and Minnie wanted to bring fine, ready-made clothing to Texas. Their exact motivations remain unclear, but Carrie's previous experience with department stores, and the group's successful sales business likely influenced their decision.

In 1907, Carrie, Al, and Herman started Neiman Marcus, with the men handling finances and logistics, and Carrie in charge of choosing what goods to sell—a combination of farm goods and readymade fashion. She traveled to New York and Paris to choose garments that met her standards of simplicity and elegance. Carrie was recovering in the hospital from typhoid fever on opening day, but the store was a resounding success from the beginning.

The efforts of the founding families and their employees, along with the growth of Texas industries such as cotton, cattle, and oil, contributed to the development and expansion of Neiman Marcus. Carrie Marcus Neiman and others involved with the store played roles in the evolution of retailing in Dallas.

The store carried many goods that were not available anywhere else in the United States, combined with their devotion to tracking down the perfect piece for their customers, led Carrie to develop a branch of the store devoted to long-distance orders.

In 1928, Carrie's husband's continued infidelity (including with a buyer for Neiman Marcus) brought about their divorce and a full buyout of the store by her brother Herbert Marcus and the Marcus clan. She never remarried. She began hosting fashion shows in the stores during the 1930s, and established the Neiman Marcus Fashion Award for outstanding fashion designers in 1938, elevating the store's status to an arbiter of couture. During World War II, Carrie pushed designers to create fashions that aligned with the rationing of certain materials, including nylon and other fabrics.

In 1950, her brother Herbert died and she became the chairman of the board of directors. Stanley Marcus, who had been the leader of the Store for many years, became president at the death of his father. Carrie believed that the store's location in Dallas was a core part of the Neiman Marcus identity, and refused to consider stores outside Dallas for a long time, as she hoped the store would bring tourists to Dallas. She eventually approved of the Preston Road Neiman Marcus branch store—the first store outside of Downtown Dallas—before her death in 1953. Carrie Neiman was greatly revered and participated in all major store decisions, remained arbiter of style and taste to her large base of “good customers“ up until her death. She died in 1953 of complications from pleurisy. Shortly afterward, she was designated a "symbol of elegance" by Holiday magazine. She had no children.

She, her husband and her family figure prominently in the history of Jews in Dallas, including in the establishment of the Columbian Club, which was founded because Jews were not welcome in other Dallas clubs. Herbert Marcus and Al Neiman were also early members of Lakewood Country Club and Carrie used both Columbian and Lakewood to entertain long after she divorced Al. Stanley Marcus and his brothers established the Carrie Marcus Neiman Fashion Collection in 1960. In 1972 the Collection was moved to the University of North Texas, included in the Texas Fashion Collection. Which, if any, of the garments were actually owned by Carrie Neiman is not known.

== Awards and honors ==
In 2025, Neiman was inducted into the Texas Women's Hall of Fame in recognition of her "leadership as a visionary businesswoman".
