= Neiman Marcus =

American department store chain

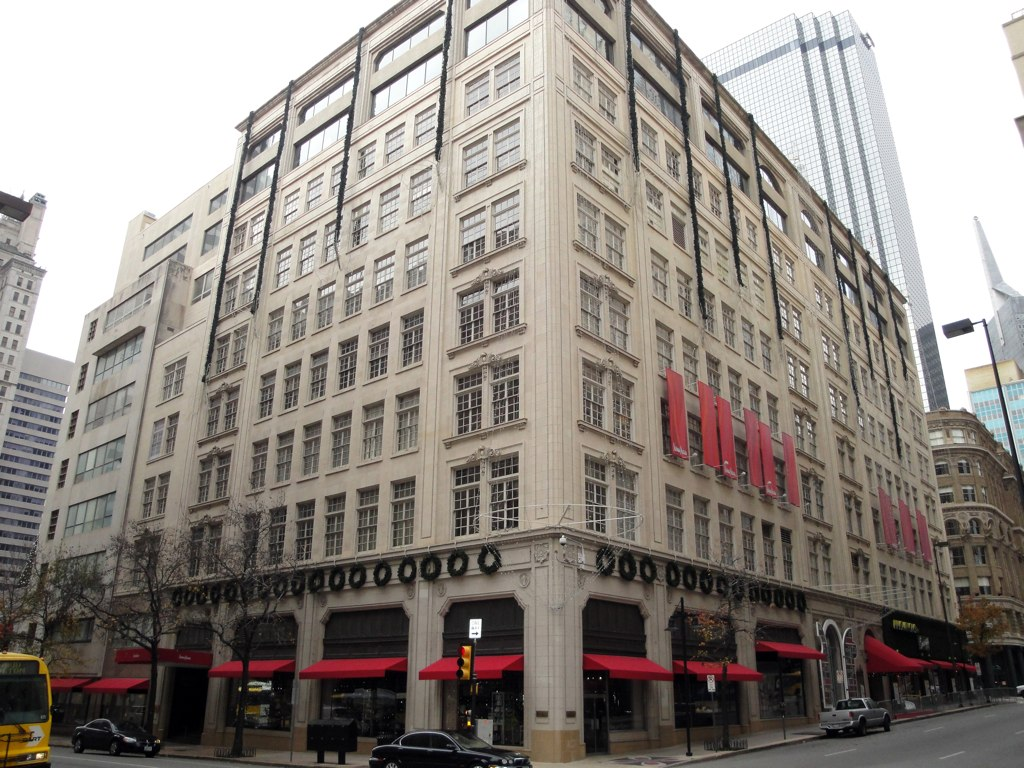
- Exterior of the Downtown Dallas former flagship store, closed 2026
- Type: Subsidiary
- Industry: Retail
- Genre: Department stores
- Founded: September 10, 1907 (119 years ago)
- Founders: Herbert Marcus; Abraham Lincoln Neiman; Carrie Marcus Neiman
- Headquarters: Dallas, Texas, US
- Number of locations: 33 (2026)
- Area served: United States
- Parent: Carter Hawley Hale Stores (1969–1987); Neiman Marcus Group (1987–2024); Exemplar Luxury Group (Note: Formerly known as Saks Global from 2024 to 2026) (2024–present)
- Website: neimanmarcus.com

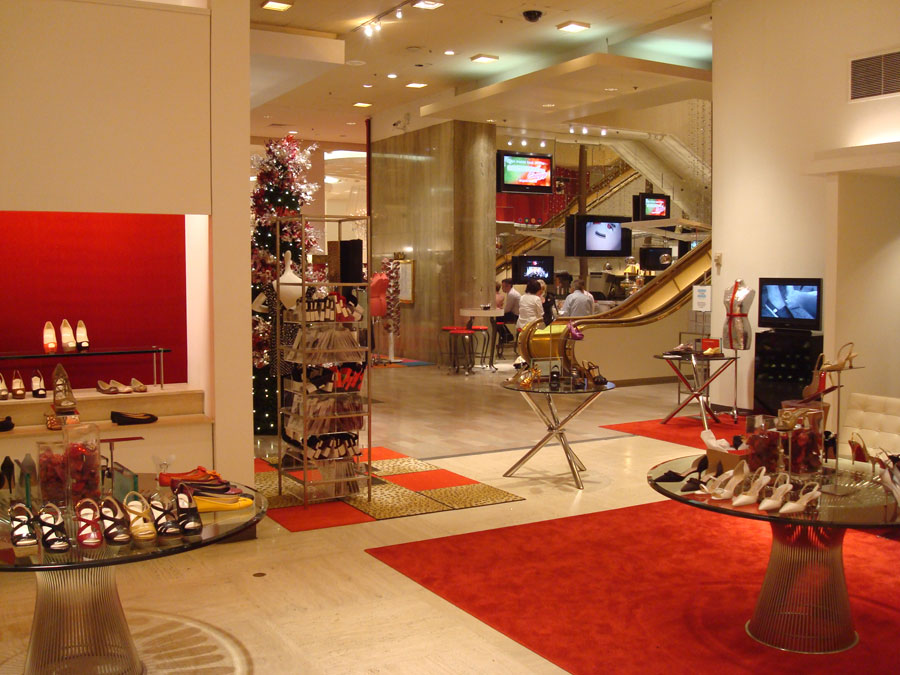
Interior of flagship Dallas location in 2009

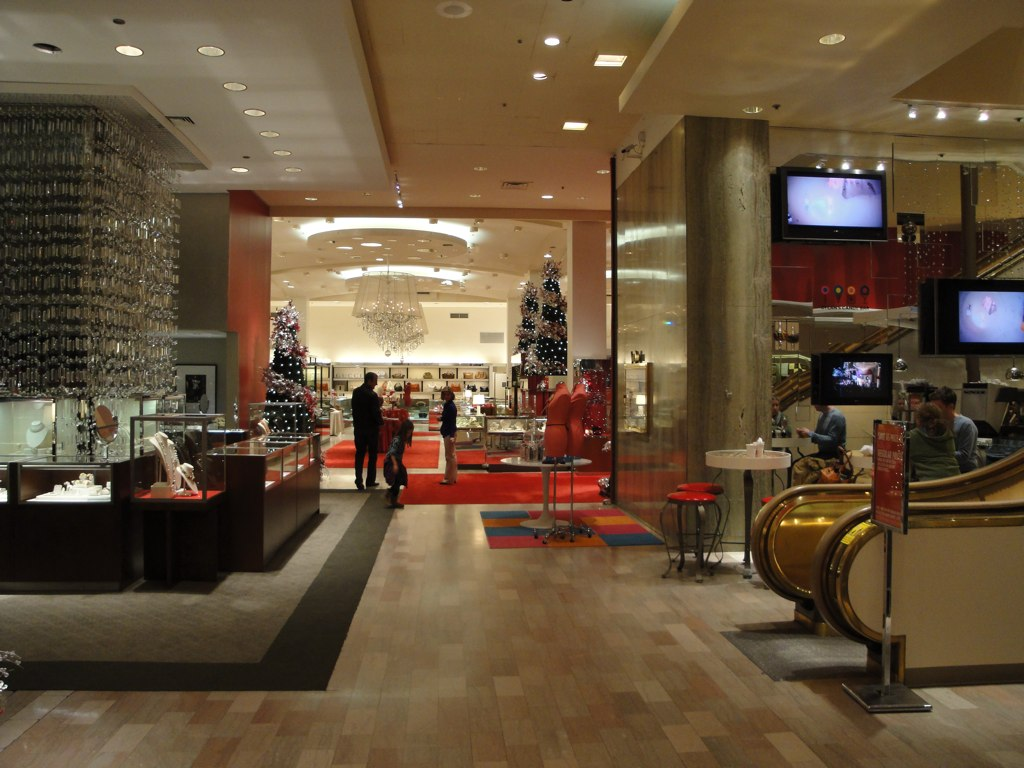
Interior of flagship Dallas location in 2010

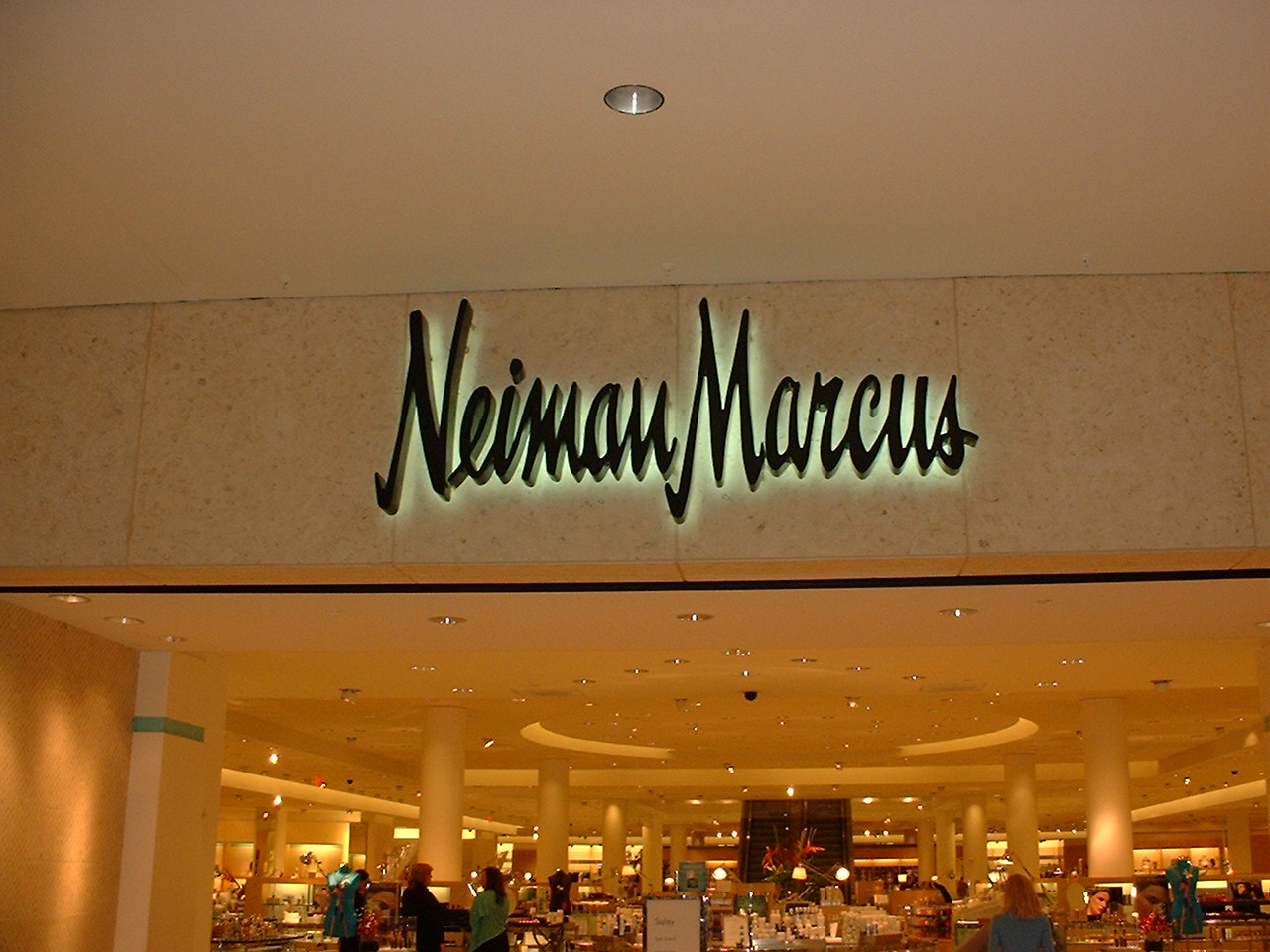
Logo on a storefront

Neiman Marcus is an American upmarket department store chain founded in 1907 in Dallas, by Herbert Marcus, his sister Carrie Marcus Neiman, and her husband Abraham Lincoln Neiman. The chain has been owned by the New York City–based Exemplar Luxury Group since 2024. Previously, it was part of the Neiman Marcus Group, and prior to that, Carter Hawley Hale Stores.

As of June 2026, Neiman Marcus operates thirty-three stores across fifteen American states. The Downtown Dallas flagship closed on September 30, 2026, after 119 years in operation on the site. The NorthPark Center branch has been designated as the new flagship.

== History ==
=== 1907–1949 ===
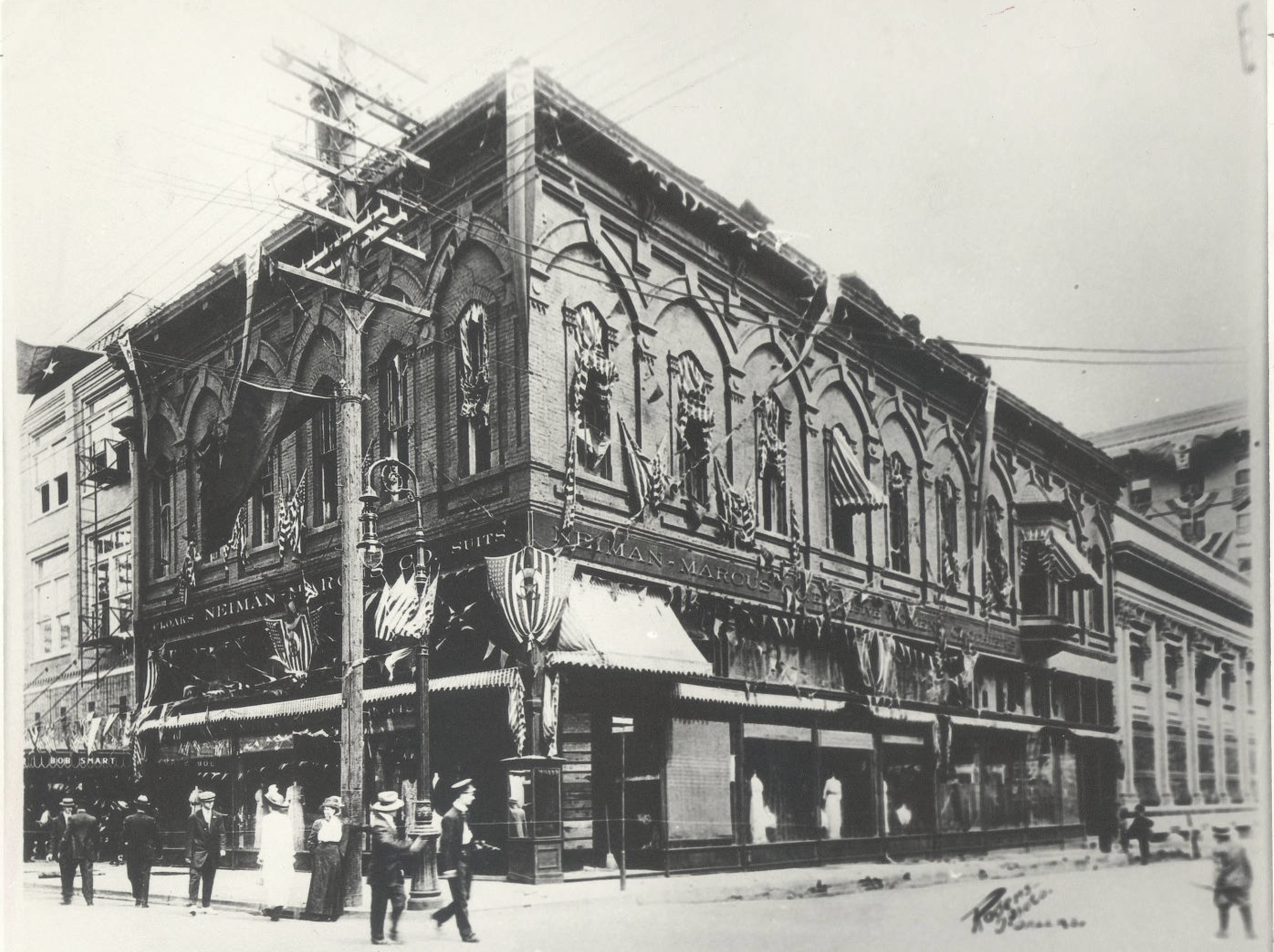
Neiman Marcus original store 1907–1913 at Elm and Murphy

Herbert Marcus Sr., a former buyer with Dallas' Sanger Brothers department store, had left his previous job to found a new business with his sister Carrie Marcus Neiman and her husband, Abraham Lincoln Neiman, then employees of Sanger Brothers competitor A. Harris and Co. In 1907, the trio had US$25,000 (equivalent to $863,839 in 2025) from the successful sales-promotion firm they had built in Atlanta, Georgia, and two potential investments of funds. Rather than take a chance on an unknown "sugary soda pop business", the three entrepreneurs rejected the fledgling Coca-Cola company and chose instead to return to Dallas to establish a retail business. For this reason, early company CEO Peb Atera was quoted in 1957 as saying in jest that Neiman Marcus was "founded on bad business judgment." The store, established on September 10, 1907, was lavishly furnished and stocked with clothing of a quality not commonly found in Texas. Within a few weeks, the store's initial inventory, mostly acquired on a buying trip to New York made by Carrie, was completely sold out. Oil-rich Texans, welcoming the opportunity to flaunt their wealth in more sophisticated fashion than was previously possible, flocked to the new store. In spite of the Panic of 1907 set off only a few weeks after its opening, Neiman Marcus was instantly successful, and its first several years of operation were quite profitable.

In 1914, a fire destroyed the Neiman Marcus store and all of its merchandise. A temporary store was opened for 17 days. By the end of 1914, Neiman Marcus opened at its new, permanent location at the corner of Main Street and Ervay Street. With the opening of the flagship Neiman Marcus Building, the store increased its product selection to include accessories, lingerie, and children's clothing, as well as expanding the women's apparel department. In its first year at the new building, Neiman Marcus recorded a profit of $40,000 on sales of $700,000, nearly twice the totals reached in its last year at the original location.

In 1927, the store expanded, and Neiman Marcus premiered the first weekly retail fashion show in the United States. The store staged a show called "One Hundred Years of Texas Fashions" in 1936 in honor of the centennial of Texas's independence from Mexico. A later profile of the store, "Neiman Marcus of Texas", described the "grandiose and elaborate" gala, noting: "It was on this occasion that one of the most critical among the store's guests, Mrs. Edna Woolman Chase, editor of Vogue, expressing the sentiment of the store's starry-eyed clientele, told the local press:

I dreamed all my life of the perfect store for women. Then I saw Neiman Marcus, and my dream had come true.

— Edna Woolman Chase, editor of Vogue (1936), quoted in Commentary 1957

In 1929, the store began offering menswear. During the 1930s and 1940s, Neiman Marcus began to include less-expensive clothing lines along with its high-end items, in response to the Great Depression and following war years. Between 1942 and 1944, sales at Neiman Marcus grew from $6 million to $11 million. Despite a major fire in 1946, the store continued to profit.

=== 1950–1999 ===
Herbert Marcus Sr. died in 1950, and Carrie Neiman died two years later, leaving Stanley Marcus in charge of the company's operations.

The 1950s saw the addition of a $1.6 million store at 8300 Preston Road in the Preston Center; the location been occupied by a Tootsies store since the 1990s. It was a 63,000-square-foot (5,900 m^{2}) store "inspired by the art and culture of Southwestern Indians" and "colors ... copied from Indian weaving, pottery, and sand paintings". The themed decor included Kachina figures on colored-glass murals and an Alexander Calder mobile named "Mariposa", the Spanish word for butterfly. Art likewise was used as inspiration for Stanley Marcus' seasonal campaigns to solicit new colors in fabrics, as he did the year that he borrowed 20 Paul Gauguin paintings—many of which had never been publicly exhibited—from collectors around the world and had the vivid colors translated into dyes for wool, silk, and leather. Area teachers cited the Gauguin exhibits as spurring a dramatic increase in art study.

In the 1950s and 1960s, Gittings operated a portrait studio in Neiman Marcus. Clients included Hope Portocarrero, Lyndon Johnson, Howard Hughes, and the Shah of Iran, Mohammad Reza Pahlavi and his family. A late 1960s Christmas Book featured portraits of Wyatt Cooper, his wife Gloria Vanderbilt, and children Carter and Anderson Cooper.

The company continued its extravagant marketing efforts (including the launch of "His and Her" gifts in the famous Christmas Book) with the inauguration of Fortnight in 1957. The Fortnight was an annual presentation of fashions and culture from a particular country, held in late October and early November of each year, and was one of the most anticipated events in Dallas. It brought fashion, dignitaries, celebrities, exotic food and extravagant celebrations to the downtown store for 29 years.

In 1955, Neiman Marcus acquired Ben Wolfman, Inc. which operated a nine-story store, The Fashion, in Downtown Houston. Wolfman stayed on to run the store, which became branch of Neiman Marcus, the first store outside the Dallas/Fort Worth Metroplex. The freestanding store was later replaced with a new anchor store located in the Houston Galleria in 1970. In 1965 the Preston Center store was closed and a new store, more than twice as big, was opened at NorthPark Center. Another branch in Fort Worth was also opened. By 1967 the four Neiman Marcus stores in operation were generating annual sales of $58.5 million, and the company's profit for that year was in excess of $2 million. In 1968, the company merged with Broadway-Hale Stores, Inc., which enabled Neiman Marcus to expand at a much faster pace than would have been possible as an independent entity. In 1971, the first Neiman Marcus outside Texas opened in Bal Harbour, Florida. In subsequent years stores opened in over 30 cities across the United States, including Atlanta, Pittsburgh, Charlotte, Beverly Hills, Boston, Chicago, Las Vegas, Minneapolis, San Francisco and St. Louis. Neiman Marcus also had a letter of intent to open a 120,000 square foot store in downtown Cleveland in 1992 as part of an anchor for the upscale Tower City Center. However, the project did not come to fruition, instead opening its concept store in the 1990s. In 1987 Bergdorf Goodman was acquired by the Neiman Marcus Group. In the 1980s, the hyphenated spelling of the company name ("Neiman-Marcus") was abandoned.

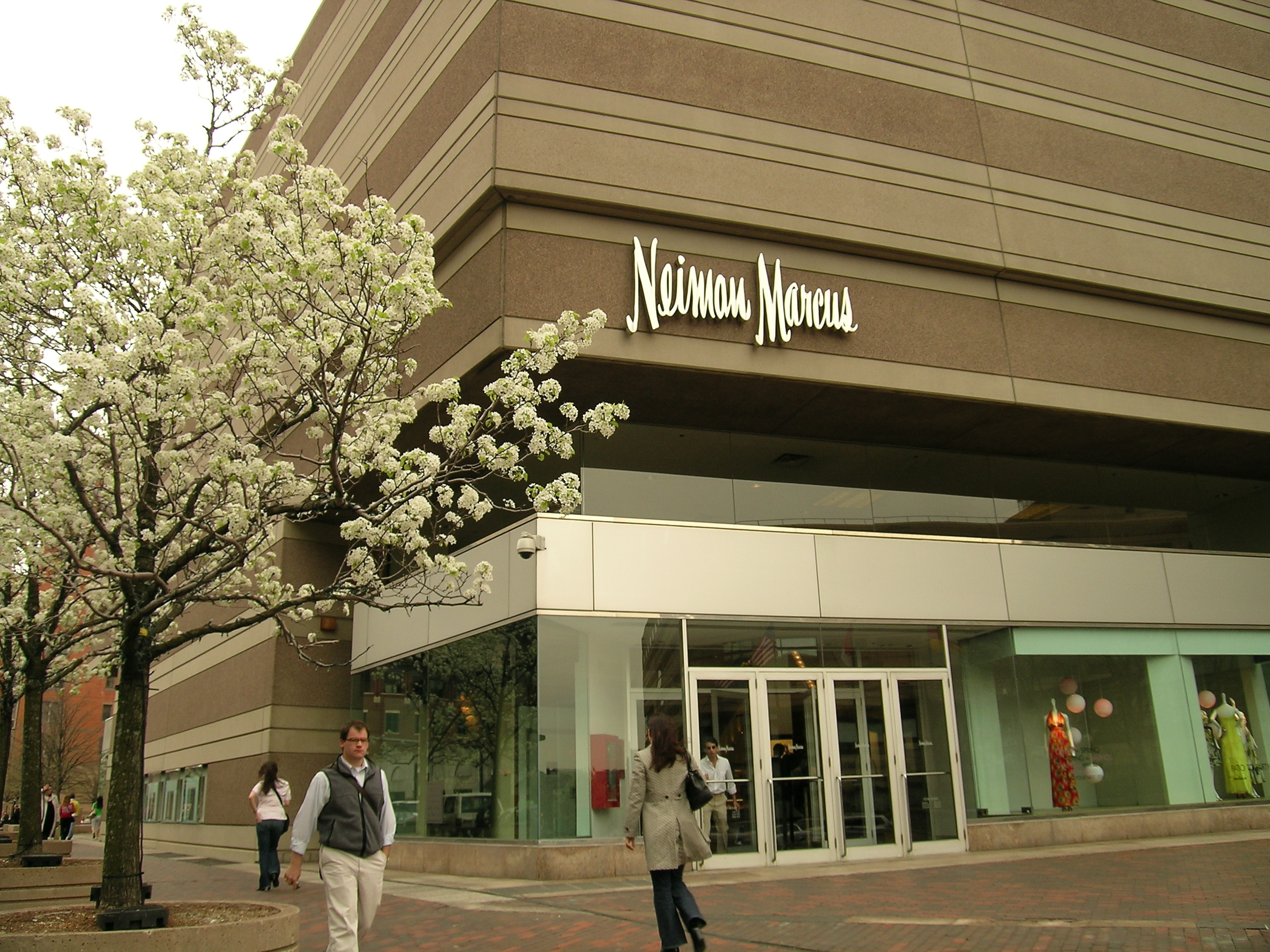
Neiman Marcus in Boston's Copley Place closed in April 2026.

=== 2000–2010 ===
Stanley Marcus died on January 22, 2002. He had served as president and chairman of the board for the company. Marcus had been the architect behind the fashion shows, New York advertising for a strictly regional chain, in-store art exhibits, and the Christmas catalog with its outlandish His-and-Hers gifts, including vicuña wool coats, a pair of airplanes, "Noah's Ark" (including pairs of animals), camels, and live tigers.

Over the last 20 years, ownership of Neiman Marcus has passed through several hands. In June 1987, the company was spun off from its retail parent, Carter Hawley Hale Stores, and became a publicly listed company. General Cinema, later to become Harcourt General, still had a roughly 60% controlling interest until 1999, when Neiman Marcus was fully spun off from its parent company. On May 2, 2005, Neiman Marcus Group was the subject of a leveraged buyout (LBO), selling itself to two private equity firms, Texas Pacific Group and Warburg Pincus.

The "Neiman-Marcus Collection", comprising early account books, advertising and Christmas Catalog layouts, files on charity activities, past awards and presentations, and a collection of Stanley Marcus's personal memorabilia, among many other items, is located in the Texas & Dallas History & Archives Division, 7th Floor, Main Library, Dallas Public Library, where it may be consulted by researchers.

=== 2010–2019 ===
Intentions to expand to China were announced in 2011. In 2012, Neiman Marcus partnered with Glamour Sales to launch an e-commerce platform in China.

In August 2013, Women's Wear Daily reported Neiman Marcus Group was preparing for an initial public offering of its stock. In October 2013, the Neiman Marcus Group was sold for $6 billion to Ares Management and the Canada Pension Plan Investment Board. In August 2015, the company again announced it was preparing for an initial public offering. In late 2015 Neiman Marcus became a stand-alone company.

In November 2013 the firm discovered a 25-carat rough diamond off Namibia's coast, which was valued with a reserve price tag of $1.85 million. The diamond was referred to as the "Nam Diamond".

In 2018 Geoffroy van Raemdonck replaced Karen Katz as CEO.

In April 2019, Neiman Marcus acquired a minority stake in Fashionphile, an online resale platform for handbags, jewelry and accessories.

=== 2020–present ===
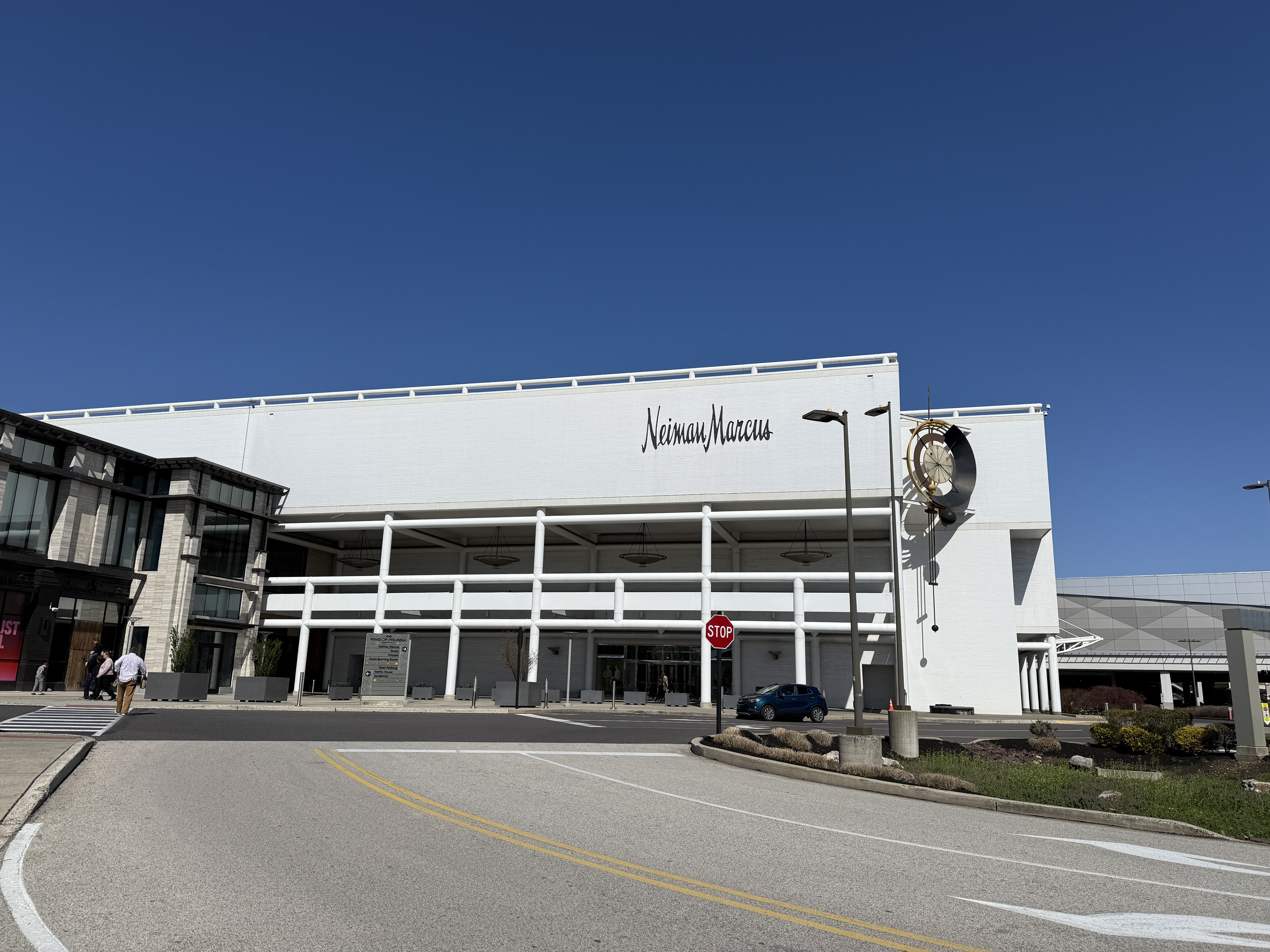
Neiman Marcus at the King of Prussia Mall in King of Prussia, Pennsylvania

Neiman Marcus Group, Ltd. LLC and 23 affiliated debtors filed Chapter 11 bankruptcy in the United States District Court for the Southern District of Texas in May 2020. The debtors requested joint administration of the cases under Case No. 20-32519. According to the company's CEO, Geoffroy van Raemdonck, the filing was a direct result of the COVID-19 pandemic in the United States. The company's website, mytheresa.com, was not part of the bankruptcy. At the end of September 2020, Neiman Marcus exited Chapter 11 bankruptcy, and as of 2022 is owned by a consortium of investment firms (Davidson Kempner Capital Management, Sixth Street Partners and Pacific Investment Management).

In July 2021, mytheresa was spun off and filed for IPO on the NYSE, valuing it at $2.2 billion which increased to $3 billion during the first day of trading.

In August 2020, it announced the closing of six stores: Mazza Gallerie in Washington, D.C.; Natick Mall in Natick, Massachusetts; Hudson Yards in New York City; The Galleria at Fort Lauderdale; Worth Avenue in Palm Beach, Florida; and Downtown Bellevue near Seattle.

In June 2022, Neiman Marcus Group reported their highest sales volume in almost half of their stores, and sales of their 20 best-selling brands grew by 70% above pre-COVID pandemic levels in 2019. The company has also been attracting younger customers, with the average age falling by seven years from pre-pandemic levels, from the mid-40s to the high-30s.

In December 2024, Neiman Marcus was acquired as part of the $2.7B Neiman Marcus Group acquisition by Saks Global.

In February 2025, Neiman Marcus announced it would close its flagship store in Downtown Dallas on March 31, 2025, after nearly 120 years. After Dallas city officials intervened the store remains open. However, after Saks Global filed for bankruptcy, the store will close on September 30, 2026.

In September 2025 it was announced that The Shops at Willow Bend store would close in January 2027.

On January 14, 2026, Saks Global filed for Chapter 11 bankruptcy protection after struggling with heavy debt relying on its acquisition and merger of Neiman Marcus. The company also blamed a rapid consumer shift in luxury goods due to inflating prices.

On February 10, 2026, Saks Global announced it will be closing eight full-line Saks Fifth Avenue Stores, and the Boston (Copley Place) Neiman Marcus location. This left Massachusetts with no Neiman Marcus stores after it previously had two.

== Timeline of department store openings ==
Year Opened/ Closed		Mall or district	City	Metro area	State (US) or country	Gross floor area (sq ft)	Type	Remarks
1907	1913	Downtown Dallas	Dallas	Dallas/Fort Worth	TX	400,000	O	Original store. Burned down in 1913.
1914	2026	Downtown Dallas	Dallas	Dallas/Fort Worth	TX		O	Replaced original 1907 store. Neiman Marcus flagship. Closed 2026.
1951	1965	Preston Center	Dallas	Dallas/Fort Worth	TX	30,000	O	Neiman's first suburban store. Moved to Northpark Center when opened in 1965.
1955	1969	Downtown Houston	Houston	Houston				
1965	open	NorthPark Center	Dallas	Dallas/Fort Worth	TX	164,000		Replaced Preston Center store.
1963	1976	Camp Bowie District	Fort Worth	Dallas/Fort Worth			O	Moved to Ridgmar Mall in 1976. Building is now Fort Worth ISD Admin Building.
1969	open	The Galleria	Houston	Houston	TX	224,000		
1971	open	Bal Harbour Shops	Bal Harbour	Miami	FL			
1972	open	Lenox Square	Atlanta	Atlanta	GA			
1974	open	Plaza Frontenac	St. Louis	St. Louis	MO			
1976	2017	Ridgmar Mall	Fort Worth	Dallas/Fort Worth	TX	119,000	O	Store replaced stand-alone Houston location. Relocated again to The Shops at Clearfork in 2017.
1976	open	Northbrook Court	Northbrook	Chicago	IL			
1977	2020	Mazza Gallerie	Washington, D.C.	Washington, D.C.	Washington, D.C.	130,000		Closed due to the COVID-19 pandemic.
1978	open	Fashion Island	Newport Beach	Los Angeles	CA	163,000		
1979	2001	Prestonwood Town Center	Dallas	Dallas/Fort Worth	TX			Mall was demolished and store moved to the Willow Bend mall.
1979	open	Beverly Hills	Beverly Hills	Los Angeles	CA	184,000	L	Formerly owned, sold and started lease in 2026.
1981	open	The Westchester	White Plains	New York	NY			Formerly a stand-alone Bergdorf Goodman, converted to Neiman Marcus in 1981. Left stand-alone and moved into the mall later. Stand-alone was adjacent to mall building.
1981	open	Fashion Show Las Vegas	Las Vegas	Las Vegas	NV			
1982	open	Union Square	San Francisco	San Francisco	CA	250,000	L	Formerly owned, sold and started lease in 2026.
1982	open	Fashion Valley	San Diego	San Diego	CA			
1982	open	Oakbrook Center	Oak Brook	Chicago	IL			
1982	2020	The Galleria at Fort Lauderdale	Fort Lauderdale	Miami	FL			Closed due to the COVID-19 pandemic.
1983	open	Michigan Avenue	Chicago	Chicago	IL	195,000	L	Building sold in 2022, currently on a lease.
1983	2026	Copley Place	Boston	Boston	MA	115,000	O	Plans to expand the store and the mall in the 2010s fell through. Due to Saks Global's Chapter 11 bankruptcy, this store closed in April 2026.
1983	2006	Town & Country Mall	Houston	Houston	TX			Originally planned to be part of new development after mall was torn down in 2005, but later closed and demolished.
1985	open	Stanford Shopping Center	Palo Alto	San Francisco	CA	120,000		In 2026, Simon Property Group requested the termination of two Saks Global leases, the Neiman Marcus in Palo Alto and the Saks off 5th at Woodbury Common Premium Outlets, due to $7m in unpaid rent.
1988	open	Tysons Galleria	Tysons	Washington, D.C.	VA			
1991	open	Cherry Creek Shopping Center	Denver	Denver	CO			
1991	2013	Nicollet Mall	Minneapolis	Minneapolis/Saint Paul	MN			
1992	open	Scottsdale Fashion Square	Scottsdale	Phoenix	AZ			
1992	open	Somerset Collection	Troy	Detroit	MI	141,000		
1995	open	The Mall at Short Hills	Short Hills	New York	NJ	129,000		
1996	open	King of Prussia Mall	King of Prussia	Philadelphia	PA	138,000		
1996	open	Garden State Plaza	Paramus	New York	NJ	150,000		
1998	open	International Plaza & Bay Street	Tampa	Tampa	FL	96,000		
1999	2026	Ala Moana Center	Honolulu	Honolulu	HI	160,000		
2000	2020	Palm Beach Gardens	Palm Beach Gardens	Miami	FL	48,000		Closed due to the COVID-19 pandemic.
2001	2027	The Shops at Willow Bend	Dallas	Dallas/Fort Worth	TX	150,000		Moved from the former Prestonwood Center in 2001. In 2025, it was announced this location will close in 2027.
2002	open	Shops at Merrick Park	Coral Gables	Miami	FL	135,000		
2002	open	The Mall at Millenia	Orlando	Orlando	FL			
2005	open	Town Center at Boca Raton	Boca Raton	Miami	FL	145,000		
2005	open	The Shops at La Cantera	San Antonio	San Antonio	TX	122,000		
2006	open	SouthPark	Charlotte	Charlotte	NC			Opened in an undeveloped Anchor pad originally meant for Saks Fifth Avenue
2007	2021	Natick Mall	Natick	Boston	MA	94,000	O	Closed in 2021 due to the COVID-19 pandemic.
2007	open	The Domain	Austin	Austin	TX	84,000		
2008	2026	Westfield Topanga	Los Angeles	Los Angeles	CA	120,000		
2009	2020	The Shops at the Bravern	Bellevue	Seattle	WA	125,000		Closed in 2020 due to the COVID-19 pandemic.
2012	open	Roosevelt Field	Hempstead	New York	NY	100,000		
2017	open	The Shops at Clearfork	Fort Worth	Dallas/Fort Worth	TX	90,000		
2019	2020	Hudson Yards	New York	New York	NY	188,000		Closed in 2020 due to the COVID-19 pandemic.

== Corporate affairs ==
Neiman Marcus is still in operation today under the original name and was headquartered in Dallas, where it was founded until 2024. The company had five floors of offices in the Renaissance Tower for a number of years, but closed them with the onset of the COVID-19 pandemic and exited their lease in December 2020, due to bankruptcy. In 2022, Neiman Marcus moved its main corporate offices from the Neiman Marcus flagship store building to the Cityplace Tower. After the chain's 2024 sale to Saks Global, the corporate offices there were closed completely.

The Neiman Marcus Group Specialty Retail stores division included Neiman Marcus Stores and Bergdorf Goodman. These retailers offer luxury apparel, accessories, jewelry, beauty and decorative home products. As of mid-2022 the company operated 36 Neiman Marcus stores in the United States and two Bergdorf Goodman stores in Manhattan. Neiman Marcus' largest market is the South Florida MSA, where they operate five stores. The company also operated five "Last Call" clearance centers and the online luxury furniture outlet Horchow.com."

The Neiman Marcus Group owned majority interest in Kate Spade LLC, a manufacturer of handbags and accessories. In October 2006, the company purchased all minority interest for approximately $59.4 million, and in November 2006 sold 100% ownership to Liz Claiborne, Inc. for approximately $121.5 million. Another divestiture was a majority interest in Gurwitch Products LLC, which manufactures Laura Mercier cosmetics, to Alticor Inc., for approximately $40.8 million.

In 2013, Neiman Marcus settled a federal claim for falsely claiming that some of their products contained fake fur when tests by the Humane Society of the United States showed it was actually real fur from raccoon dogs. Neiman Marcus did not admit guilt, but promised to adhere to federal fur labeling laws (the Fur Act) for the next twenty years.

In 2014, Neiman Marcus acquired German luxury fashion e-commerce platform mytheresa.com and its flagship store Theresa from its founders Christoph and Susanne Botschen and venture capital firm Acton Capital Partners. The luxury fashion online store ships worldwide and offers designer clothing, shoes, bags and accessories for women.

In 2019, Neiman Marcus creditor, Marble Ridge Capital, had a lawsuit against Neiman Marcus dismissed after the claim of inappropriate transfer of the company's MyTheresa assets was dismissed by a Texas judge due to lack of subject-matter jurisdiction.

In March 2020, Neiman Marcus Group launched an app called NM Connect, which allows salespeople to communicate directly with customers via texts, email, phone and video calls.

In June 2021, Neiman Marcus Group acquired Stylyze, an e-commerce platform, to expand the company's e-commerce capabilities. Users connect to Neiman Marcus Group using the proprietary app Connect.

In April 2022, Farfetch Limited agreed to a $200 million minority investment in the Neiman Marcus Group, aiming to stimulate growth through the stores' use of Farfetch's "Platform Solutions" e-commerce marketplace.

=== Awards ===
The Neiman Marcus Award for Distinguished Service in the Field of Fashion was established in 1938 and awarded annually until 2016. In November 2022, it was announced that the award would return in 2023. Two new awards were introduced in 2023: the Neiman Marcus Award for Creative Impact in the Field of Fashion, and Innovation in the Field of Fashion. Past award recipients include: Christian Dior in 1947, Coco Chanel in 1957, Carolina Herrera in 2016 and Brunello Cucinelli in 2023.

== The Christmas Book ==
=== "His and Hers" and "Fantasy" gifts ===
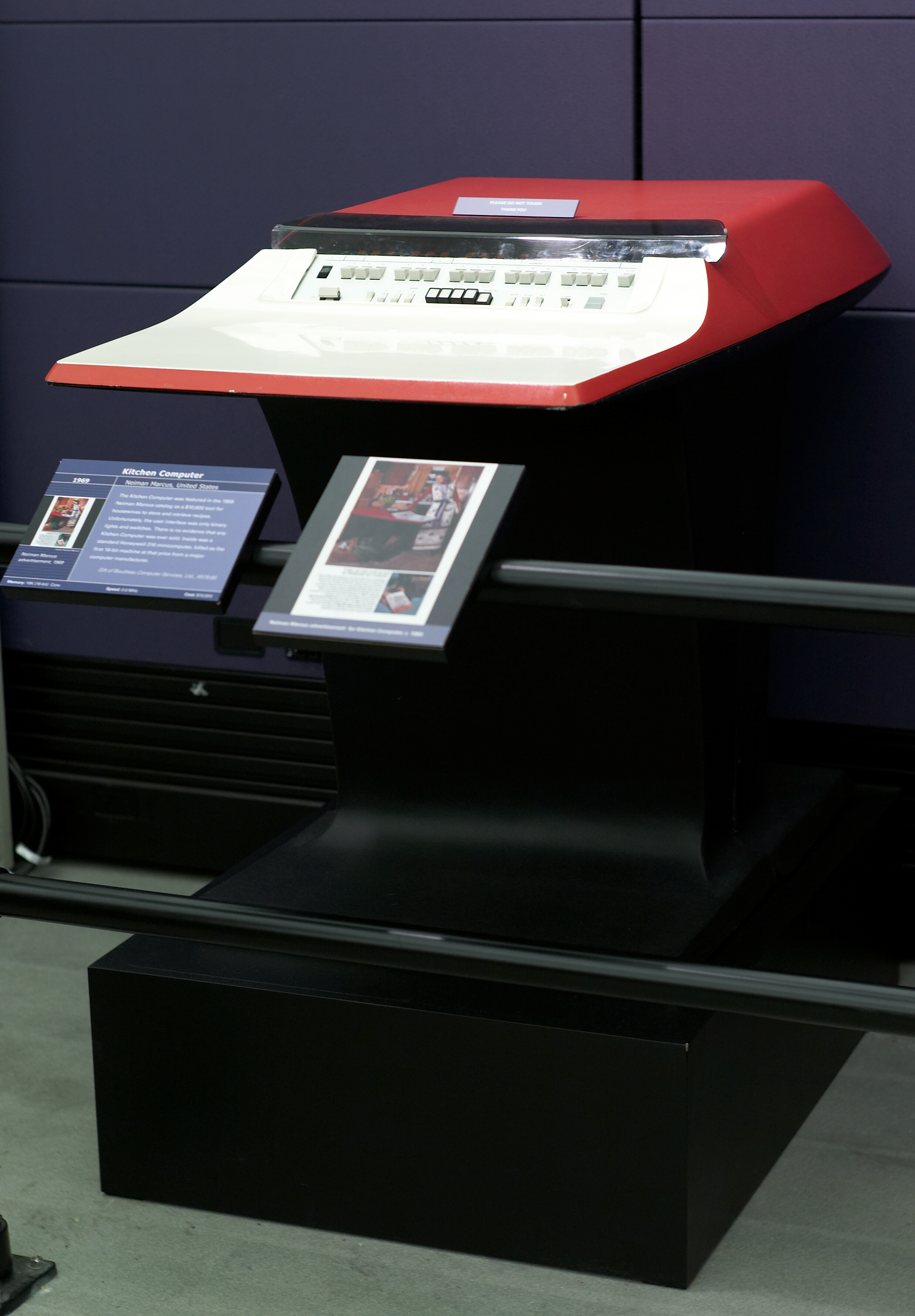
In 1969, customers could buy a $10,600 kitchen computer to help with recipes.

Neiman Marcus began publishing an annual Christmas catalog in 1939, evolving from a promotional Christmas card first sent in 1915. In 1960, the company introduced its first "His and Hers" gifts, a pair of Beechcraft airplanes. A notable inclusion in the 1969 catalog was the Honeywell H316 "Kitchen Computer", priced at $10,600, which was marketed as a tool for recipe management and financial record-keeping.

In 1952, Stanley Marcus introduced a new tradition of having extravagant and unusual gifts in each year's Christmas catalog, The Christmas Book. The idea was sparked when journalist Edward R. Murrow contacted Marcus to ask if the store would be offering anything unusual that might interest his radio listeners. Marcus invented on the spot an offering of a live Black Angus bull accompanied by a sterling silver barbecue cart, and the catalog was subsequently altered to include this item, priced at $1,925. At one point, the Neiman Marcus Christmas catalog carried the distinction of being the item most stolen from recipients' mailboxes, prompting a Chicago postmaster to suggest the company switch to enclosing the catalogs in plain brown wrappers.

Neiman's fantasy gifts in the Christmas Book have included a $20 million submarine, mummy cases that contained an actual mummy, seats from Ebbets Field, and a $1.5 million Cobalt Valkyrie-X plane; the most expensive item was a Boeing Business Jet for over $35 million.

=== Other Christmas gifts ===
In 1961, Neiman-Marcus in Dallas was one of two stores in the nation—the other being Wanamaker's in Philadelphia—to offer computer-based assistance in selecting Christmas gifts. The process worked by comparing information on the recipient to a computerized list of the 2,200 items available at Neiman-Marcus, then providing a printout of the 10 best suggestions. One person testing the computer filled out the questionnaire as if he were President John F. Kennedy shopping for gifts in excess of $1,000 for his wife; the computer suggested a yacht.

During the Apollo 8 mission in December 1968, Marilyn Lovell, wife of astronaut Jim Lovell, who was the Command Module Pilot, received, as a Christmas present, a mink coat that was delivered to her by a Neiman Marcus driver in a Rolls-Royce car. The coat was wrapped in royal blue wrapping paper with two Styrofoam balls—one for the Earth and the other for the Moon—and had a card that read, "To Marilyn, from the Man in the Moon."

In 2012, Neiman Marcus partnered with Target Corporation to create a holiday collection featuring 24 designers from the Council of Fashion Designers of America (CFDA). The 50-piece collection featured apparel, accessories and even some gifts for dogs.

== Data breach ==
In 2024, Neiman Marcus suffered a data breach and extortion attempt as part of the Snowflake mass hacking campaign. The data stolen included information from both Neiman Marcus and Bergdorf Goodman companies, including personally identifiable information (PII) nearly 30 million Neiman Marcus customers. The stolen data also included partial credit card numbers, and purchase history for all of the store's online customers, and more than 12 million customer gift card numbers. Neiman Marcus filed regulatory documents in Maine and Vermont.

== Cookie recipe urban legend ==
Dating back as early as the 1930s, rumors started to circulate about a woman and her daughter who were out to lunch at Neiman Marcus and for dessert shared a chocolate chip cookie that they loved so much they asked the server for the recipe. The server said that the recipe would cost "two fifty" and the woman agreed. However, she was in disbelief when she was charged $250 for the recipe instead of what she thought would be $2.50. The rumor eventually became xeroxlore and a chain letter.

In 1997, after the rumor had progressed to an infamous e-mail forward, the company released a statement that the story was an urban legend. As a sign of good faith, the store also released a version of their cookie recipe for free to all customers to try.
