= Ruth T. Gross =

American pediatrician

Ruth Taubenhaus "Toby" Gross (June 24, 1920 – October 16, 2007) was an American pediatrician. She was the first woman to receive an endowed professorship at Stanford University when she was named the Katharine Dexter and Stanley McCormick Memorial Professor of Pediatrics.

== Biography ==
Gross was born in Bryan, Texas, on June 24, 1920. Her father, Jacob Joseph Taubenhaus, was a botanist and the first Jewish professor at Texas A&M University. Her mother Esther Taubenhaus was the daughter of rabbi Chaim Hirschensohn. Her aunts included Tehilla Lichtenstein, a cofounder of the Jewish Science movement with her husband Morris Lichtenstein, and Tamar de Sola Pool, who was president of the Hadassah Women's Zionist Organization of America and was married to Jewish scholar David de Sola Pool. Her cousins included the political scientist Ithiel de Sola Pool. She earned her bachelor's degree from Barnard College and M.D. from the Columbia University College of Physicians & Surgeons as one of the only two women in her class in 1944.

After completing her residency at Charity Hospital in New Orleans, Gross served as an instructor at the Radcliffe Infirmary in Oxford and joined the faculty of Stanford Medical School. She spent a year at the University of Pavia before associate professor of pediatrics and co-director of the human genetics division at the Albert Einstein College of Medicine in New York.

In 1966, Gross returned to San Francisco to become of chief of pediatrics at the Mount Zion Hospital and focused on community and social medicine. She rejoined the Stanford faculty in 1973 as professor of pediatrics and in 1976 was named Katharine Dexter and Stanley McCormick Memorial Professor of Pediatrics. She was elected a member of the Institute Of Medicine, later known as the National Academy of Medicine, in 1979.

Gross died on October 16, 2007, in New Orleans.
