= Chaim Hirschensohn =

American rabbi (1857–1935)

Rabbi Chaim Hirschensohn חיים הירשנזון
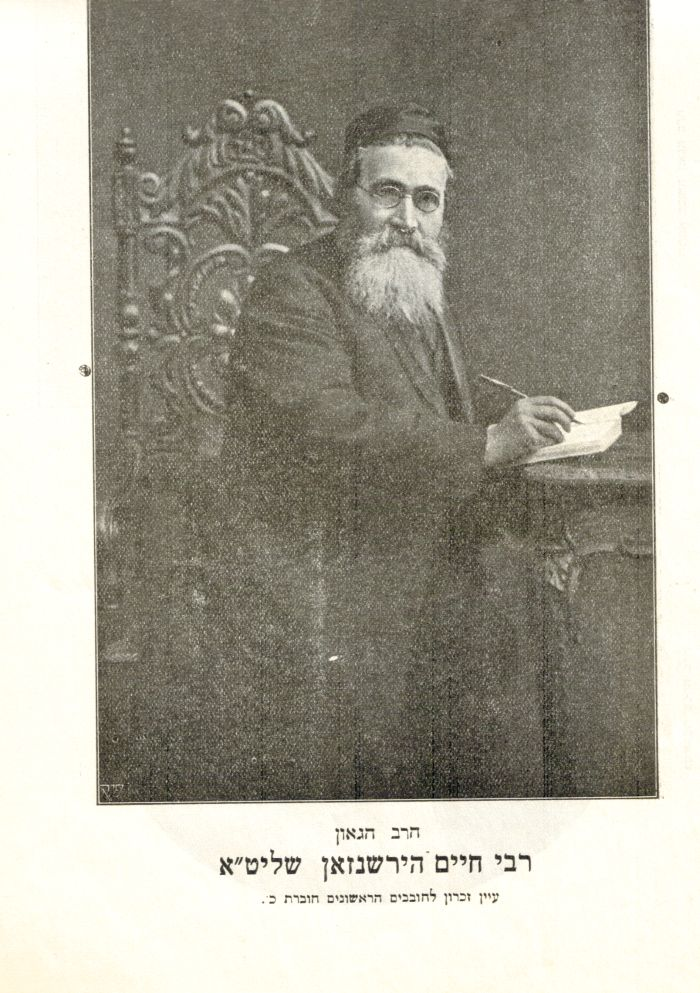
- Rabbi Chaim Hirschensohn
- Title: Chief Rabbi of Hoboken, New Jersey

Personal life
- Born: August 31, 1857 Safed
- Died: September 15, 1935 (aged 78) Hoboken, New Jersey
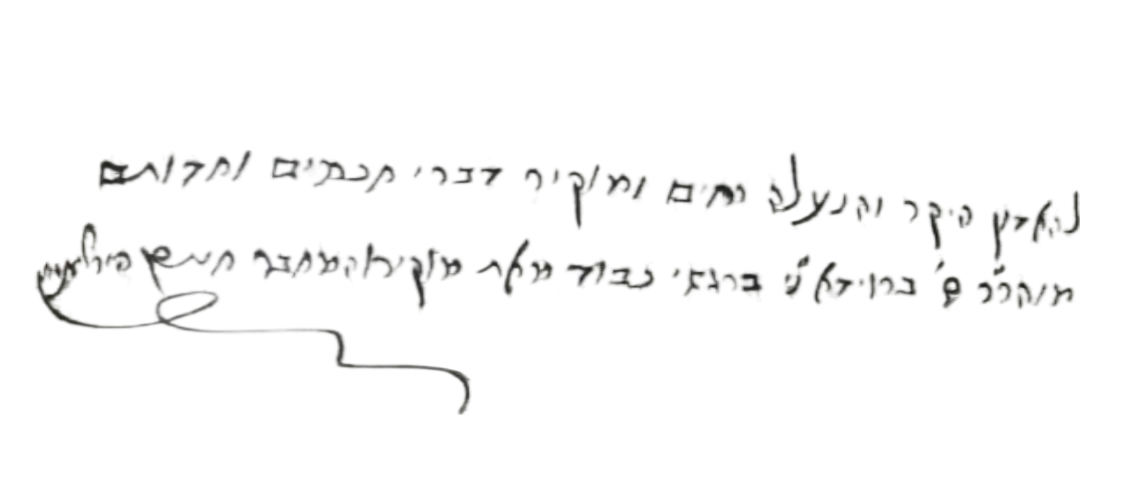
- Signature

Religious life
- Religion: Judaism
- Denomination: Orthodox

Rabbi Chaim Hirschensohn (Hebrew: חיים הירשנזון; 1857 – 1935) was a prolific author, rabbi, thinker, and early proponent of Religious Zionism.

== Biography ==
Chaim Hirschensohn was born on August 31, 1857 in Safed, in the Galilee to Rabbi Yaakov Mordechai Hirschensohn, who had emigrated there from Pinsk in 1848. Following an earthquake in Safed in 1864, the family (which included Chaim's older brother, Rabbi Yitzchok Hirschensohn) moved to Jerusalem.

Like his brother, the young Zionist Chaim Hirschensohn worked with Eliezer Ben-Yehuda to revive spoken Hebrew and helped found the Safah Berurah ("Plain Language") society in Jerusalem. He and his wife Chava published works and journals both in Hebrew and Yiddish.

In 1878, Hirschensohn spent two years travelling to centers of Torah study in Russia, meeting with esteemed rabbinic scholars. He returned to Palestine with rabbinical ordination from several prominent European rabbis. In 1884, he left again for Hungary and Germany, where he began publishing a monthly Torah-scientific journal, Hamisdarona, in Frankfurt am Main.

Returning to Jerusalem, Hirschenson taught Talmud at the Lämel School (often misspelled 'Lemel School'); established a publishing house; published, together with his wife and brother, a Yiddish paper called Beit Yaakov; assisted running the Abarbanel library (later absorbed in the National Library of Israel); and established a B’nai B’rith office in Jerusalem.

In 1896, he worked with several organizations to construct new homes outside the walls of Jerusalem's Old City. "When the Turkish government issued a prohibition against selling property to Jews in Palestine, Hirschensohn’s financial situation deteriorated, and he left the country to secure a stable livelihood."

Hirschensohn served as principal of a Hebrew school in Constantinople. Joining the Constantinople delegation to the Sixth Zionist Congress in Basel, he was convinced by the American delegation to immigrate to the United States, where he arrived in 1903.

In 1904, he was hired as the Chief Rabbi of Hoboken, New Jersey, a post that included Hoboken, West Hoboken, Jersey City Heights, Union Hill and the environs in its jurisdiction. He remained in Hoboken until his death in 1935.

== Writings ==
Rabbi Hirschensohn wrote on many subjects, including the relationship between Judaism and democracy, the status of women, and conflicts between traditional Judaism and modern scholarship and science. He is probably best known for Malki Ba-Kodesh, a 6-volume work he published between 1919 and 1928, in which he explores the halakhot (Jewish laws) that might govern a future Jewish state.

== Approach to Halacha ==
It is commonly argued that issues of Jewish law must be approached objectively. Hirschensohn opposed this approach on an ideological level, supporting conscious subjectivity when discussing halachic questions. "Just as the posek who deals with a case of mamzerut or agunah has an agenda, and tries his utmost to reach a lenient conclusion, Hirschensohn adopts this model with virtually every issue he examines, a trait that some will regard as evidence of a lack of seriousness, while others will see it as a refreshing alternative to the apostles of halachic objectivity.”

== Family ==
Hirschensohn had five children. The oldest, Nima (previously Nechama) Adlerblum, became a noted educator and Zionist activist. Another daughter, Esther, married Jacob Joseph Taubenhaus and founded the Hillel chapter at Texas A&M University. A third daughter, Tamar, married Rabbi David de Sola Pool. Another daughter, Tehilla, was married to Rabbi Morris Lichtenstein and assumed leadership of the Society for Jewish Science after his death in 1939 until her own death in 1972. Tehilla was the first Jewish woman in America with a pulpit, although she was not ordained. The 5th was a son, Benjamin who became a mathematical engineer and resided in Pittsburgh until his death. Benjamin had one daughter, Ethelfreda Hirshenson. His grandchildren included Stanford University pediatrician Ruth T. Gross and MIT political scientist Ithiel de Sola Pool.

In order for the family to emigrate to the United States, Benjamin at age 15 was sent ahead by ship to find a synagogue for his father to lead. Unable to afford passage, he had to tie himself to the deck at night to avoid being swept overboard.
