= David Lefkowitz =

American rabbi (1875–1955)

David Lefkowitz (April 11, 1875 – June 5, 1955) was a rabbi who led Temple Emanu-El in Dallas, Texas from 1920 to 1949, after having worked at Temple Israel in Dayton, Ohio. He opposed the rise of the Ku Klux Klan, which had been revived in 1915; it was strongly opposed to immigrants from eastern and southern Europe who were Jews and Catholics. He was a Founding Executive Committee Member of the Dayton Branch of the National Association for the Advancement of Colored People (NAACP).

He and his wife Sadie Braham (July 21, 1879 – February 21, 1955) bequeathed their collection to the Perkins School of Theology, which houses the "Sadie and David Lefkowitz Collection of Judaica". Sadie Lefkowitz was also active in the National Association of Temple Sisterhoods. A Mason, Rabbi Lefkowitz continued to attend meetings knowing that Klansmen were present. He discussed incidents of violence to convince other members that the Klan was inhibiting the progress of their booming city.

== Early life and education ==
David Lefkowitz was born on 11 April 1875 in Prešov, then known as Eperies, Hungary, in the Austro-Hungarian Empire. Together with his widowed mother, Lena, and three brothers, he immigrated as a child, arriving on 31 May 1882 in New York City in the United States. Because his mother was struggling financially, she placed David and one of his brothers in the Hebrew Orphan Asylum for care. There they learned English, started school, and grew up.

Lefkowitz graduated from City College of New York in 1894. He completed graduate studies at University of Cincinnati in 1899 and was ordained at Hebrew Union College in the same city in 1900.

== Marriage and family ==
After getting a permanent position as rabbi, in 1901, Lefkowitz married Sadie Braham of Cincinnati, Ohio, a daughter of immigrants Lewis M. Braham and Helen Phillips of London, England. They had four children together: Lewis, Harry, Helen, and David Jr.

David Jr. also became a rabbi. Later, he was assistant to his father at Temple Emanu-El in Dallas from 1937 to 1940, before becoming the rabbi of B'nai Zion Congregation in Shreveport, Louisiana.

== Career ==
Lefkowitz first led Temple B'nai Jeshurun, a congregation in Dayton, Ohio, from 1900 to 1920.

In 1920, Lefkowitz went to Dallas to Temple Emanu-El, where he served until 1949. A growing industrial city, Dallas attracted both black and white migrants from rural areas, as well as European immigrants, making for a volatile social mix. The rapid changes aroused the fears that encouraged the growth of the Ku Klux Klan in the city. Lefkowitz was one of the civic leaders who spoke against the Klan. He became a Mason and knew that Klansmen attended their meetings. He appealed to civic spirit by telling how the KKK's hostility to newcomers and violent incidents would work against the city's reputation and growth.

While in Dallas, Lefkowitz helped organize "TAMC Hillel Club" (Texas A&M Hillel), the oldest Hillel Foundation organization in the United States, three years before the national Hillel Foundation was organized at the University of Illinois. The group had begun in 1916 as the "TAMC Menorah Club," brought together by Dr. Jacob Joseph Taubenhaus (the chief of plant pathology and physiology at the Agricultural and Mechanical College in College Station (later Texas A&M), and his wife Esther Taubenhaus.

In 1919, Lefkowitz was one of 299 American Jews to endorse an anti-Zionist statement delivered to President Woodrow Wilson and UN Peace Council. In 1942, Lefkowitz became one of the founding rabbis of the American Council for Judaism, another Jewish organization opposed to the Zionist cause. His son, David Jr, was also a member.

Lefkowitz became interested in the history of Jews in Texas. He and Rabbi Henry Cohen of Galveston interviewed many early settlers and their families, to gather accounts of German Jews as well as later Jews from eastern Europe. They wrote a historical account of Jewish Texans for the Texas Centennial in 1936.

== See also ==
- History of the Jews in Brazos County, Texas
- History of the Jews in Dallas, Texas
