= Nima Adlerblum =

Jewish philosopher (1881–1974)

Dr. Nima Adlerblum
- Born: August 4, 1881; Jerusalem, Ottoman Palestine
- Died: August 25, 1974 (aged 93); Jerusalem, Israel
- Education: Columbia University
- Notable work: Memoirs of Childhood: An Approach to Jewish Philosophy; A Perspective of Jewish Life Through Its Festivals
- Spouse: Israel S. Adlerbium
- Children: 1
- Parents: Rabbi Chaim Hirschensohn (father); Chava Hirschensohn (mother)
- Relatives: Rabbi Benjamin Shaul ha-Cohen (grandfather); Jacob Mordechai Hirschensohn (grandfather)

Nima Adlerblum (Hebrew: נחמה אדלרבלום; née Hirshenson; August 4, 1881 -- July 25, 1974) was a philosopher, writer, educator, and Zionist activist. Her father was Rabbi Chaim Hirschensohn, a prominent Zionist activist and early proponent of Religious Zionism.

== Early life ==
Adlerblum was born Nehama Hirschensohn to parents Chaim and Chava Hirschensohn in Jerusalem, Ottoman Palestine. She was the oldest of five children, including Tamar de Sola Pool and Tehilla Lichtenstein. In 1901, her family emigrated to Turkey, and in 1903, they settled in the United States. Her father led five congregations in Hoboken, New Jersey. She studied at the Alliance Israelite Universelle in Paris.

== Education ==
Adlerblum received a bachelor's, master's, and doctorate from Columbia University. Her master's thesis was "The Hebrew conception of suffering analyzed and compared with those of the Greeks with a brief sketch of the conception of suffering developed by Christianity." In 1926, she received her doctorate with her thesis "A Study of Gersonides in His Proper Perspective" under the guidance of John Dewey. Adlerblum argued that Jewish philosophy existed independently of Islamic and Greek philosophy. She based much of her philosophy on the works of Yehuda Halevi.

== Philosophy ==
Adlerblum was strongly influenced by nineteenth-century romanticism and the works of Yehuda Halevi. In 1917, she published "A Reinterpretation of Jewish Philosophy," in which she argued that Jewish philosophy existed distinct from the surrounding Greek and Muslim influences, shaped directly by the historical experiences of the Jewish people. In "A Study of Gersonides in His Proper Perspective," Adlerblum argues that while Maimonides thought "theology was a superimposed structure on Judaism," Gersonides believed that "Jewish theology could not be torn away from tradition, from the laws and from historical experiences." She claims that both philosophers must be studied independently of the Greek philosophers of the time, such as Aristotle.

She worked with Rabbi Leo Jung, contributing to works in his Jewish Heritage series. After her death, he described her as "a unique manifestation of the human spirit."

In a 1934 correspondence with Mordecai Kaplan, she expressed a positive attitude towards Reconstructionist Judaism and Kaplan's philosophy of "Judaism as a civilization", calling it "a solution to many of our problems, and indeed the only approach."

== Zionist and Jewish activism ==
Judaism is at its best within enclosed boundaries, in the land of milk and honey, where the mountains dance like rams and the Jordan flows out of reverence for God.

— Nima Adlerblum, A Study of Gersonides in His Proper Perspective

Adlerblum was involved in Zionist organizations throughout her life. As a child, she was one of the first children in Jerusalem, after Eliezer Ben-Yehuda, to use Hebrew as an everyday language. She served on the board of directors of Hadassah, a Zionist women's organization, from 1922-1935. She also founded Hadassah's national culture and educational program. She corresponded with other Zionist activist's, including Henrietta Szold.

She often advocated on behalf of Jews in European countries, publishing reports on the conditions of Jewry in Germany and Italy. She reportedly helped 250 Jewish refugees in Italy flee Hitler.

== Personal life ==
She married Israel S. Adlerblum, a fellow Zionist activist and insurance consultant, in 1914. They had one daughter, Ivriah, who later had four children of her own. In 1971, Adlerblum and her husband, Israel, returned to Israel, living for a short time in Herzliyyah before moving to Jerusalem. She died at the age of 92 on July 25, 1974, a year after the death of her husband.

== Publications ==
- Reflections on the Life and Work of Rabbi David de Sola Pool. Tradition (New York), 1995-10, Vol. 30 (1), p. 7-16.
- Hadassah and the Gender of Modern Jewish Thought: The Affective, Embodied Messianism of Jessie Sampter, Irma Lindheim, and Nima Adlerblum. American Jewish history, 2020-04, Vol. 104 (2), p. 423-456.
- A Perspective for the Study of Jewish Philosophy. The Journal of Philosophy, 1923-08, Vol. 20 (17), p. 457-466
- Hadassah and the gender of modern Jewish thought: the affective, embodied Messianism of Jessie Sampter, Irma Lindheim, and Nima Adlerblum. American Jewish History 104,2-3 (2020) p. 423-456.
- The Philosophy of Don Hasdai Crescas. The Journal of Philosophy, 1921, Vol. 18 (26), pp. 721-722.
- Dodi Ve-Nechi. The Journal of Philosophy, 1922, Vol. 19 (23), pp. 639-641.
- THE COLLECTIVE JEWISH SPIRIT: An Interpretation of Jewish Philosophy. Tradition (New York), 1960-10, Vol. 3 (1), p. 44-59.
- Gollancz's Translation of Dodi Ve-Nechdi (Uncle and Nephew) (Book Review). The Journal of Philosophy, 1922, Vol. 19 (23), p. 639.
- Husik's A History of Medieval Jewish Philosophy (Book Review). Journal of Philosophy, Psychology, and Scientific Methods, 1918, Vol. 15 (1), p. 22.
- A History of Medieval Jewish Philosophy. The Journal of Philosophy, Psychology and Scientific Methods, 1918, Vol. 15 (1), p. 22-25.
- A Reinterpretation of Jewish Philosophy. Journal of Philosophy, Psychology, and Scientific Methods, 1917-03, Vol. 14 (7), p. 181-189.
