= Alfred Geiger Moses =

Rabbi in Mobile, Alabama and Founder of Jewish Science

Alfred Geiger Moses (1878–1956) was an American rabbi associated with Reform Judaism and the founder of Jewish Science, a Jewish spiritual movement comparable with the New Thought Movement and viewed as supplementing services at conventional synagogues.

== Overview ==
Moses was born on September 23, 1878, to Rabbi Adolph and Emma Isaacs Moses. Adolph S. Moses (1840-1902) served as a rabbi for several congregations in the American South. He authored a work titled The Religion of Moses (1894). Alfred Geiger Moses received his rabbinical ordination from Hebrew Union College in Cincinnati, Ohio, in 1901. He served as the rabbi at the Reform Congregation Sha'arai Shomayim, in Mobile, Alabama, from 1901 to 1940. The congregation reportedly had six hundred members during Moses' tenure. Moses' father, Adolph Moses had served the same congregation from 1871-1881.

In terms of the founding of Jewish Science, while Moses was concerned with the issue for several years during his early rabbinical career, his first major public act was his 1916 publication of Jewish Science: Divine Healing in Judaism which sought to raise awareness of spirituality in Jewish prayer. Moses sought to persuade American Jews seeking spirituality in the Christian Science and New Thought movements that spirituality could be found within Judaism. Moses' 1916 work was republished in 1920 in an expanded edition and titled Jewish Science: Psychology of Health, Joy and Success or the Applied Psychology of Judaism.

=== Personal life ===
Moses married Birdie Feld in 1915.

== Publications ==
- A History of the Jews of Mobile (1904). Baltimore: Lord Baltimore Press.
- A Congregation in the Name of God (1905). Mobile, Alabama: Brisk Press.
- Our Present Condition as a Jewish Community (1905). Mobile, Alabama.
- Jewish Science: Divine Healing in Judaism (1916). Mobile, Alabama: Gill Printing.
- A Peace Anthology: A Bible Message on Peace (1916). Mobile, Alabama: Gill Printing.

== See also ==
- Morris Lichtenstein, founder and leader of the Society of Jewish Science (1922-1938)
- Tehilla Lichtenstein, leader of the Society of Jewish Science (1938-1973)
