= Temple Israel (Dayton, Ohio) =

Reform congregation in Dayton, Ohio

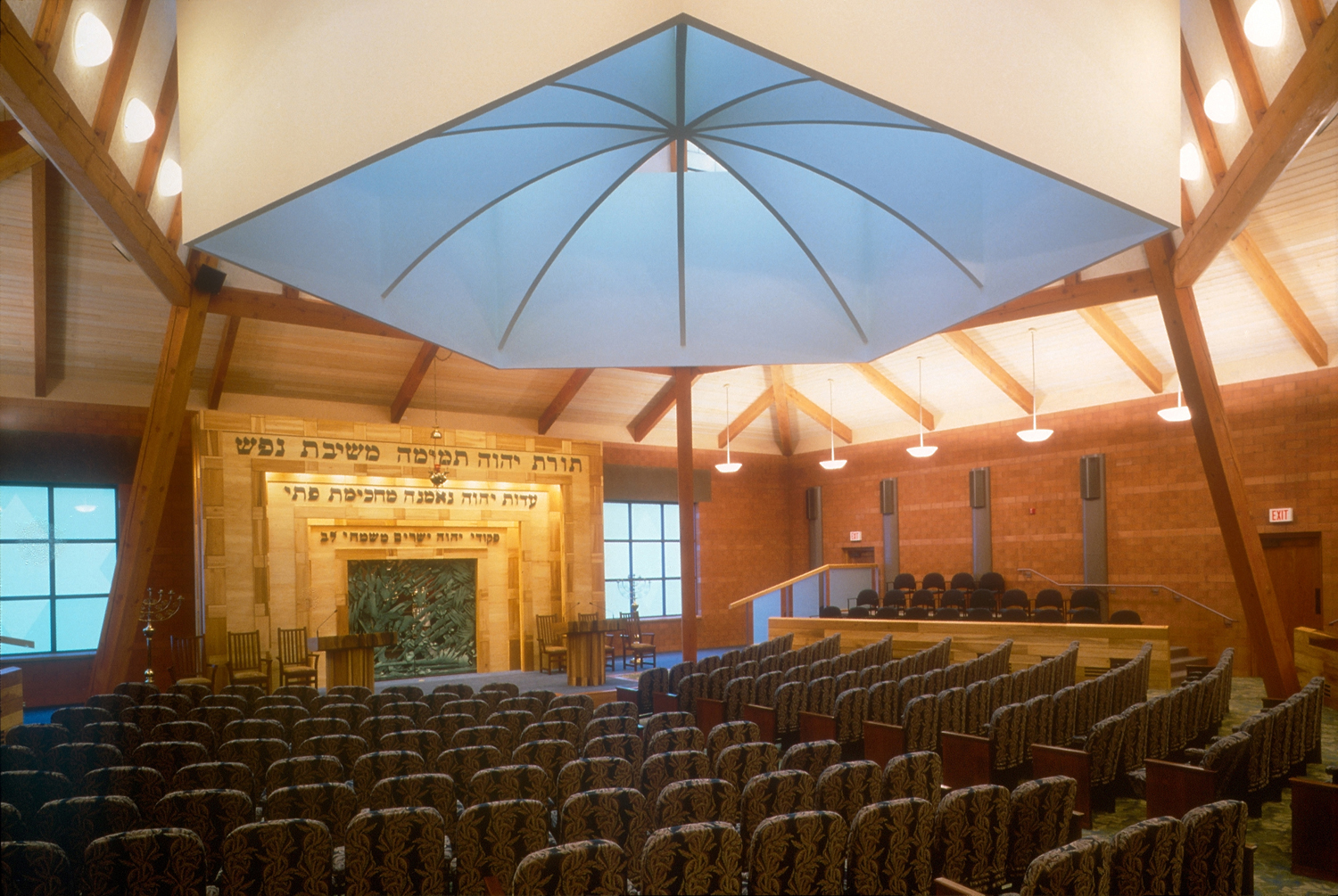
- Temple Israel synagogue sanctuary

- Location of the synagogue in Ohio

Religion
- Affiliation: Reform Judaism
- Ecclesiastical or organisational status: Synagogue
- Leadership: Rabbi Karen Bodney-Halasz; Rabbi David M. Sofian (Emeritus)
- Status: Active

Location
- Location: 130 Riverside Drive, Dayton, Ohio
- Country: United States
- Coordinates: 39°46′08″N 84°11′24″W

Architecture
- Established: 1854 (as a congregation)
- Completed: 1863 (4th and Jefferson); 1893 (1st and Jefferson); 1927 (Salem and Emerson); 1994 (Riverside Drive)

Website
- tidayton.org

Temple Israel is a Reform Jewish congregation and synagogue, located at 130 Riverside Drive in Dayton, Ohio, in the United States.

Formed in 1850, it incorporated as "Kehillah Kodesh B'nai Yeshurun" in 1854. After meeting in rented quarters, the congregation purchased its first synagogue building, a former Baptist church at 4th and Jefferson, in 1863. Strongly influenced by Rabbi Isaac Mayer Wise, it rapidly modernized its services, and, in 1873, was a founding member of the Union for Reform Judaism.

The congregation sold its existing building in 1893, and constructed a larger one at First and Jefferson, later severely damaged by the Great Dayton Flood of 1913. In 1927, the congregation moved to still larger, multi-purpose premises at Salem and Emerson Avenues, outside downtown Dayton, and began to use the name "Temple Israel", adding a new sanctuary to the building in 1953. Temple Israel moved to its current building in 1994.

Synagogue membership grew steadily for over 100 years, from 12 families in 1850 to 150 in the early 1900s, 200 by 1927, and 500 by 1945, peaking at 1,100 in the 1960s. By 1995, however, membership was down to 800 families.

Temple Israel has had a number of long-tenured rabbis who were influential both in the congregation and in the larger Dayton community. These have included David Lefkowitz (1900–1920), Louis Witt (1927–1947), Selwyn Ruslander (1947–1969) and P. Irving Bloom (1973–1997). As of 2011, the rabbis were David M. Sofian and Karen Bodney-Halasz.

== The early years, at 4th and Jefferson ==
What was later to become Temple Israel was originally formed as a Hebrew Society in 1850 by twelve Jewish men under the leadership of Joseph Lebensburger, a German Jew and first permanent Jewish resident of Dayton. The Society met daily for prayers in rented rooms: first above a shop in the old Dayton Bank Building (which was later the Steele High School, and has since been demolished) near Monument and Main Streets, and later in larger quarters in a building next to the Cooper building, a block south on Main Street. It also hired its first Torah reader, a "Mr. Wendel", and purchased—for $100 (today $3,900)—a small piece of land for a cemetery on what is now Rubicon Street.

The Society incorporated as "Kehillah Kodesh B'nai Yeshurun" in 1854. It moved to larger facilities, first near First and Main Streets in 1860, and then, in 1863, to the northeast corner of 4th and Jefferson Streets. There Kehillah Kodesh B'nai Yeshurun purchased for $1,500 (today $39,000) its first owned premises, the building of a Baptist church whose congregation was moving to Main Street.

The structure required "extensive remodeling", and Lebensburger, as building chairman, led the campaign to raise the necessary $9,000 (today $235,000). Funds came not only from the membership but also from non-Jewish members of many local societies, including the Odd Fellows and Masons. Rabbi Isaac Mayer Wise assisted B'nai Yeshurun's then–religious leader Rev. Mr. Delbanco with the dedication of what became "the seventh congregation-owned Jewish House of Worship in Ohio."

== Move to Reform, and early rabbis ==
Influenced by Wise, the congregation implemented many reforms in its services. In 1861 they adopted Wise's Minhag America prayer book. In that same decade they added an organ, did away with the prayer shawl, and started a religious school. In the 1870s the congregation removed yahrzeit candles from the sanctuary, and added family pews and a mixed choir (men and women together). In 1873 B'nai Yeshurun was one of the first thirteen founding members of the Union of American Hebrew Congregations (UAHC), now Union for Reform Judaism.

By 1889 B'nai Yeshurun had outgrown its original cemetery, and the congregation purchased 8 acres (3.2 ha) on West Schantz Avenue in Oakwood. Oakwood was a "restricted community"; Jews were not allowed to reside or own stores there. According to Leonard Spialter, president of the Dayton Jewish Genealogical Society, "if you were dead, you could be buried in Oakwood, but if you were alive, you couldn't live there". Relatives began moving those buried at the Rubicon cemetery to the new "Riverview Cemetery", including Lebensburger, who had died by this time. This process was not completed until 1967.

In its first forty years the congregation had a series of generally short-tenured religious leaders. These included Delbanco (1862–63), Moses Bauer (1863–64), L. Liebman (1864–67), Abraham Blum (1868–69), Leon Leopold (1870–72), Ben Weil (1872–76), Ephraim Fischer (1876–81), Godfrey/Gottheil Taubenhaus (later rabbi of Congregation Beth Elohim of Brooklyn, New York) (1881–85), and Israel Saenger (1885–89).

During this period the membership also transformed from immigrant-born to native-born. In 1881 the congregation's "language of record" was changed from German to English, and in 1889 the synagogue hired its first American-trained rabbi, Max Wertheimer.

A graduate of Wise's Hebrew Union College, Wertheimer had been born in Germany to Orthodox parents. He was popular with the congregation, and Dayton's Christian community highly respected him. Non-Jews attended his Friday evening sermons, and he in turn was a guest speaker at many Dayton churches.

== First and Jefferson building, and David Lefkowitz as rabbi ==
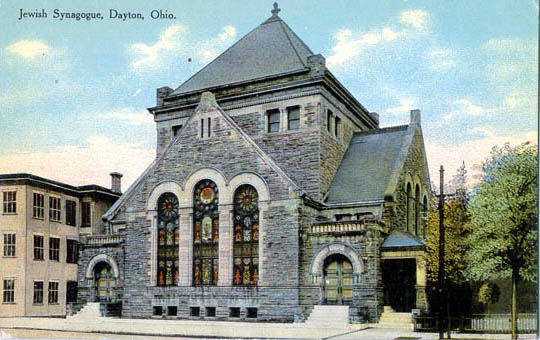
Synagogue building at First and Jefferson, damaged by the Great Dayton Flood of 1913.

In 1893 the congregation sold its building at 4th and Jefferson, and constructed a new one at First and Jefferson. Wise again assisted with the dedication.

Wertheimer's wife died young, leaving him with two small children. This tragedy made him question his faith; in 1899 he resigned from the congregation, resigned his membership in the Central Conference of American Rabbis (CCAR), and, in 1900, converted to Christian Science; in 1938 David Max Eichhorn wrote that "Mary Baker Eddy herself financed Wertheimer's study". Wertheimer later became a Baptist.

David Lefkowitz was hired as rabbi in 1900, when the congregation comprised around 150 families. Born in Eperies, Hungary in 1875, he had emigrated to the United States with his widowed mother and two brothers around 1881. Due to financial difficulties, he and one brother grew up in the Hebrew Orphan Asylum of New York, where he later worked to help pay for his schooling. A graduate of both the College of the City of New York and the University of Cincinnati, he was ordained at Hebrew Union College in 1900. Held in "high regard" by the membership, Lefkowitz was also "an active force in Dayton's civic and interfaith activities" and an "ambassador of the Jewish Community to the Dayton area". He was the first president of the Dayton chapter of the Red Cross and served on its executive board, and also served as president of the Humane Society.

Later president of the CCAR, Lefkowitz was also anti-Zionist. He was one of the prominent Jewish signatories of a petition presented in 1919 by United States Congressman Julius Kahn to President of the United States Woodrow Wilson who "asserted their wish not to see Palestine 'either now or at any time in the future' become a Jewish state." In 1942, he was one of the founders of the American Council for Judaism, "the only American Jewish organization ever formed for the specific purpose of fighting Zionism and opposing the establishment of a Jewish state in Palestine."

During Lefkowitz's tenure, the synagogue building was severely damaged by the Great Dayton Flood of 1913. Lefkowitz was "in charge of one of the districts outside the flooded area". There he assisted around 28,000 refugees in finding shelter, and "established a bread line to feed them". However, his suggestion that the congregation move to a larger building in a new location outside downtown Dayton, while taken seriously, was not acted on.

Membership had grown to 206 families by 1919. The congregational school held classes twice a week, and had 8 classes, 10 teachers, and 140 students. That year the synagogue's total income was $10,000 (today $186,000). In 1920, Lefkowitz moved to Temple Emanu-El, Dallas's largest and oldest synagogue.

== Salem and Emerson building ==
Samuel S. Mayersberg succeeded Lefkowitz as rabbi. He was "known for his oratorical skills and his crusades for moral and police reforms in Dayton". His major goal during his ministry was to acquire larger premises outside downtown Dayton, which was realized in 1927 when the congregation moved to a new building at Salem and Emerson Avenues. Besides the main sanctuary, which had seating for 600 people, the structure included a social hall and kitchen, classrooms, and offices. It was at that time that the congregation began to use the name "Temple Israel". Mayersberg left that year, and became the rabbi of Congregation B'nai Jehudah of Kansas City, Missouri. During his tenure, membership increased to 200 families.

Louis Witt succeeded Mayersberg in 1927. He worked on fostering interfaith relations, and, like his predecessors, was active in community and civic life. A tall man who sometimes wore a swallow-tail coat when conducting services, he was a strong proponent of "Classical Reform" principles, and while he was rabbi, following his preference, no one wore a skullcap in the Temple.

In 1929, at the second UAHC convention, Witt had asserted that America "by its very pleasantness and friendliness lures us away from our ancient loyalties. Its secularism is so delightful, its mutuality so penetrative, its universalism so delightful, that by a sort of sheer spiritual osmosis it incorporates us into itself and makes us look and become more and more like itself". Witt argued that Jews had to resist this pull. Ten years later, however, in a 1939 article in The Christian Century, he argued that Jews should celebrate Christmas. In his view, Christians were now more liberal and celebrated "the inherent humanness and universalism" of Christmas, rather than any specifically Christian doctrine. Stating that his children had been deprived of the holiday's pleasures, Witt asserted that Judaism was already a syncretic religion, and that celebrating the holiday was an ecumenical act which did not indicate that he was "thereby drawn even by the breadth of a hair nearer to the worship of an ecclesiastical Christ". He concluded by asking "Is it neither treason of Jew nor triumph of Christian but partnership of Jew and Christian in the making of a better world in which the Christ can have part only by energizing and perpetuating and hallowing the partnership?"

During Witt's tenure, Dayton experienced an influx of Jewish immigration, and the original German-Jewish constituency of the congregation became more diverse. Family membership reached 500 by 1945.

== New sanctuary during Selwyn Ruslander's tenure ==
Following Witt's retirement in 1947, Selwyn D. Ruslander succeeded him. Born in Pennsylvania in 1911, Ruslander had graduated from the University of Cincinnati in 1931, and was ordained at Hebrew Union College in Cincinnati in 1935. He worked at a number of non-rabbinic jobs (including as an Ordinary Seaman in the U.S. Merchant Marine), and several rabbinic positions, including both pulpit and non-pulpit roles. In 1939 he was appointed Director of Youth Education for the UAHC, and also became the first director of the National Federation of Temple Youth (now North American Federation of Temple Youth). In 1942, during World War II, he took a leave of absence from the UAHC to volunteer for the armed forces as a U.S. Navy chaplain. From 1943 to 1945 he served with the United States Eighth Fleet in the Mediterranean Sea, "the first Jewish chaplain in the history of the Navy to serve with a combat fleet", and earned a Combat Star for his participation in Operation Shingle. He was released from active duty in December 1946, and returned briefly to the UAHC, then went to South Shore Temple in Chicago, before taking the role at Temple Israel.

Ruslander brought some traditionalism back to the congregation; he reinstated the Bar Mitzvah and inaugurated the Bat Mitzvah celebrations, and re-organized the religious school and added Hebrew to its curriculum. Like his predecessors, he was very active in Dayton's civic life, serving on the boards of a large number of community organizations. Ruslander was possibly Dayton's then "best known clergyman of any faith", and during his tenure Temple Israel experienced rapid growth. In 1953, Temple Israel constructed a new sanctuary at its Salem and Emerson location, and connected it to the original building. By the end of the 1960s membership increased to 1,100 families, and Temple Israel hired Howard R. Greenstein and Joseph S. Weizenbaum as assistant rabbis. Ruslander died in 1969, and for several years Greenstein and Weisenbaum served as interim spiritual leaders. In 1972, Weizenbaum became rabbi of Temple Emanu-El of Tucson, Arizona, where he served until 1993. Greenstein joined Jacksonville, Florida's Congregation Ahavath Chesed as rabbi in 1973, and served there until 1995.

== The move to Riverside Drive, led by P. Irving Bloom ==
P. (Paul) Irving Bloom joined as rabbi in 1973. He had previously been a U.S. Air Force chaplain, then rabbi of Congregation Sha'arai Shomayim in Mobile, Alabama from 1960 to 1973. Bloom introduced a number of innovations to the synagogue, including joint programs with other Dayton synagogues, a new curriculum for the religious school and Jewish studies classes for adults, and enhanced Friday programs and lay-led services in the summer. Bloom strongly believed that Temple Israel should relocate to a more central location, as the Jewish community of Dayton had by then spread throughout Miami Valley. His vision was realized in 1994, when the congregation moved to a new building on Riverside Drive, near downtown Dayton. The building at Salem and Emerson was sold to a Baptist church. As noted by Bloom, the congregation had "come full circle"; it purchased its first building from a Baptist church in downtown Dayton, and had sold its most recent building to a Baptist church in order to return to the area. By 1995, however, membership was only eight hundred families.

Bloom retired in 1997, and was succeeded by Marc Gruber. A graduate of Brandeis University, Gruber attended Hebrew Union College in Jerusalem and New York, and was ordained in 1981. A vegetarian, he also wrote a syndicated vegetarian cooking column from 1990 to 1993. At Temple Israel he reformed the services and introduced Bar and Bat Mitzvah classes for adults. During his tenure, in 2000, the congregation celebrated its Sesquicentennial, with a number of "religious, cultural, social and social action programs" throughout the year. Gruber also served on the steering committee for the UAHC Department of Jewish Family Concerns from 1995 to 2002, working on "the inclusion of people with disabilities and special needs". Gruber moved to Central Synagogue of Nassau County in Rockville Centre, New York in 2002, and Michael Remson served as interim rabbi.

== Recent events ==
David M. Sofian joined as Rabbi in 2003. A graduate of Hebrew Union College and the University of Missouri, Sofian had served as assistant rabbi at Temple Emanuel in Worcester, Massachusetts, at Temple Shaarai Shomayim in Lancaster, Pennsylvania, and at Emanuel Congregation in Chicago, before coming to Temple Israel. Karen Bodney-Halasz, a graduate of Northwestern University, joined as Religious School Director in 2003 and became Director of Education in 2005. After her rabbinic ordination in June 2007, she became Rabbi-Educator.

Sofian retired in 2014, IIlene Bogosian was hired as interim senior rabbi and Bodney-Halasz was elevated to associate rabbi. After an eight-month search process, the temple's search committee unanimously recommended Bodney-Halasz become the next senior rabbi. The temple's board of directors approved that recommendation in January 2016, making Bodney-Halasz Temple Israel's first female senior rabbi. She officially took over July 1.
