= Jewish Science (disambiguation) =

Jewish Science is a Jewish philosophy developed in response to the Christian elements of Christian Science and New Thought.

Jewish Science may also refer to:

- Wissenschaft des Judentums, the science of Judaism
- Jewish Physics, a discriminatory term in the Nazi era
- Jewish Science, the secular scholarship of some Jews in the Middle Ages
- Jewish studies
