= History of the Jews in Brazos County, Texas =

Jewish settlement in Brazos County, Texas, began in 1865. This history includes the present Jewish communities and individuals of Brazos County and Texas A&M University.

== Temple Freda ==
One of the first Jewish temples in Brazos County is Temple Freda, which was built in 1912 and added to the U.S. National Register of Historic Places on September 22, 1983. Temple Freda is one of the three oldest religious buildings in the county. The temple is named for Ethel Freda Kaczer (1860–1912), wife of the president of the Jewish community when the synagogue was built. The temple being named after a woman is unique for a Jewish place of worship.

== Congregation Beth Shalom ==
Congregation Beth Shalom was established officially in 1968 as a member of the Union of American Hebrew Congregations (the Reform movement). Congregants originally met and worshipped at the Texas A&M Hillel Center. Due to differences, Congregation Beth Shalom left Hillel to meet at different locations in Bryan/College Station including a public school, the Unitarian Church and the College Station Community Center, until a permanent location in Bryan, Texas was obtained. The building was purchased from a Baptist church in 1990, however, the building was originally built by Mormons. Regular services are conducted by a collection of student rabbis, retired rabbis, part-time rabbis, and by congregants. A weekly religious school is also operated.

== Texas A&M Hillel ==
Texas A&M Hillel is the oldest Jewish campus organization in the United States using the name "Hillel." Founded in 1920, three years before the founding of the first official Hillel Foundation at University of Illinois, Texas A&M Hillel began as the TAMC Menorah Club and was organized in 1916 by Jacob Joseph Taubenhaus. He and his wife Esther founded the "TAMC Hillel Club" in 1920, with assistance from Rabbi David Lefkowitz. In 1958, Texas A&M Hillel opened up a building of its own.

Peter Tarlow, a rabbi, was the executive director of Texas A&M Hillel from 1983 to 2013.

== Chabad at Texas A&M University ==
Chabad at Texas A&M University, also known as the Rohr Chabad Jewish Student and Community Center at Texas A&M University, was founded in June, 2007. In 2007, the organization began participating in an international inititiative among Jewish students to write a Torah scroll.

== See also ==
- Jewish history in Texas
