= Taubenhaus =

Taubenhaus is a surname. Notable people with the surname include:

- Jacob Joseph Taubenhaus (1884–1937), American botanist
- Jean Taubenhaus (1850–1919), French chess master
