= Adolph S. Moses =

German-American rabbi

Adolph S. Moses (May 3, 1840 – January 7, 1902) was a German-American rabbi who mainly ministered in Mobile, Alabama, and Louisville, Kentucky.

== Life ==
Moses was born on May 3, 1840, in Kleczew, Poland, near the Prussian border. He was the son of Rabbi Israel Baruch Moses and Eve Graditz, and his maternal grandfather was Rabbi Joseph Graditz.

Moses received his early training and Talmud education from his father. When his family moved to Santomischel, Posen, Prussia, he continued studying in a yeshiva for three years and only rejoined the family afterwards. He then received a secular and religious education at Schrimm and Militsch in Silesia, after which he studied at the University of Breslau and the Jewish Theological Seminary of Breslau. In 1859, during the Second Italian War of Independence, he went south to Sardinia and enlisted in Garibaldi's army. He served there for a year, after which he returned to Breslau. In 1863, during the January Uprising, he went to fight with the Poles and was made an officer. He and his company were captured and imprisoned by the Russians, although he was freed with the help of the Prussian Consul and returned to Breslau. He resumed his studies in Frankfurt with his friend and mentor Abraham Geiger, and he attended the University of Vienna for two years. He then worked at an academy in Seegnitz, Bavaria from 1868 to 1870.

In September 1870, Moses immigrated to America and served as rabbi of Kahl Montgomery in Montgomery, Alabama. In June 1872, he became rabbi of Congregation Sha'arai Shomayim in Mobile. In September 1881, he became rabbi of Adath Israel Temple in Louisville, Kentucky. He served there until his death. Interested in educating the blind, he served as commissioner of the Kentucky institutions for the blind for many years. A frequent contributor to the Jewish press, he served as editor of the weekly Zeitgeist with his brother Isaac S. Moses and Emil G. Hirsch. He also wrote "Nadab and Abihu" in 1890 and "The Religion of Moses" in 1894. He also wrote the novel "Luser the Watchmaker: An Episode of the Polish Revolution" in 1883 based on his experiences during the January Uprising.

Moses began giving sermons in English shortly after he came to America, even though at the time German was prevalent in American synagogues. He leaned towards radical Reform Judaism and opposed the ritual and nationalistic aspects of "psychological Judaism," preferring to focus on Judaism as a world monotheistic doctrine of truth and morality. In 1885, he was the first to advocate acceptance of the Pittsburgh Platform. In 1890, he joined a group of rabbis in rejecting the halakhic requirement to circumcise male converts, although he also rejected conversions for people who only wanted to marry Jews. In 1892, he moved the Temple's main weekly service to Sunday. In 1893, he graduated from the University of Louisville School of Medicine. He was opposed to the early Zionist movement.

Moses was a member of B'nai B'rith, Kesher, and the Free Sons of Israel. In 1874, he married Emma Isaacs of New York City. They had ten children, including Alfred Geiger (rabbi of his father's former congregation Sha'arai Shomayim in Mobile, Alabama), J. Garfield (a lawyer in New York City), Elsie (an assistant professor in the Louisville girl's high school), Beatrice (a staff member of the Louisville Courier Journal), Mrs. L. Neumeyer of Mount Sterling, Fred B., and Octavia.

Moses died from a long illness on January 7, 1902. A thousand people attended his funeral at Temple Adas Israel, including ministers of various denominations, lawyers, and businessmen. The honorary pallbearers included Bishop Thomas Underwood Dudley, Rev. Dr. William Heth Whitsitt, ex-Governor William O'Connell Bradley, and Judge Horatio Washington Bruce. Rabbi Hyman G. Enelow delivered the eulogy, Rabbi Ignatius Muller gave the opening prayer, and Rabbi David Philipson said the closing prayer. He was buried in Adas Israel Cemetery.
