= Neve Shalom (disambiguation) =

Neve Shalom is a cooperative village in Israel.

Neve Shalom or Neveh Shalom may also refer to:

== Places ==
- Neve Shalom (neighborhood) and street, est. 1890 as a suburb of Jaffa, now part of Neve Tzedek neighbourhood in Tel Aviv-Yafo

== Synagogues ==
- The Neve Shalom Synagogue in Istanbul
- The Neveh Shalom Synagogue in Paramaribo
- The Neveh Shalom Synagogue (Portland, Oregon)
