= Peter Tarlow =

American rabbi (born 1946)

Peter E. Tarlow
- Born: May 4, 1946 (age 80)
- Occupations: Tourism Security Consultant; Rabbi; Professor at Texas A&M University
- Spouse: Sara Alpern Tarlow
- Children: 3

Peter E. Tarlow is a scholar in the area of tourism safety, a consultant for the tourism industry, and the founder of Tourism & More Inc. He worked as a security consultant to the city of Arlington, Texas, in preparation for Super Bowl XLV. Tarlow's scholarship in tourism and security has been relied upon by mainstream media for his expertise. In 2007 he was a speaker at The Intelligence Summit. His Ph.D. is in sociology and aside from his work at Texas A&M, he "teaches 'tourism safety' to police chiefs around the world".

Tarlow is a rabbi and was the executive director of Texas A&M Hillel from 1983 to 2013. On April 12, 2016, Tarlow was appointed by Governor Greg Abbott to serve as the Chairman of the Texas Holocaust and Genocide Commission with the term ending in 2019.

Tarlow is the author of Event Risk Management and Safety, which was reviewed by Security Management magazine in 2003 and 2005. He is also the author or co-author of the following books: Understanding the U.S. Government: A Guide to Understanding American Government and Elections; Tourism Security and Safety: Best Practices for Security Professionals; Tourism Security: Strategies for Effectively Managing Travel Risk and Safety; Sports Travel Security; Personal Reconstruction: A Psychological, Spiritual, Financial and Legal Course in the Art of Preventing Personal Crises, Recovering from Them; The 2020 Election: A Survival Guide; and Personal Resilience: Survival Strategies for Pandemic Times.

Tarlow is the co-founder and director of the Center for Latino-Jewish Relations (CLJR). The CLJR works to find ways that the Latino and Jewish communities can collaborate and it seeks to advocate for Israel within Latino communities throughout both North and Latin America. The CLJR is certified as a Community Housing Development Organization (CHDO) and seeks to aid those who need adequate housing by providing affordable housing to those who need it.

Tarlow was ordained as a Reform rabbi at Hebrew Union College in 1974, and served as Assistant Rabbi at Temple Emanuel in Worcester, Massachusetts, from 1974 to 1977.

He is married to Sara Alpern Tarlow and has three children.

== See also ==
- History of the Jews in Brazos County, Texas
