= Hillel at the University of Illinois Urbana-Champaign =

Jewish university group in the US

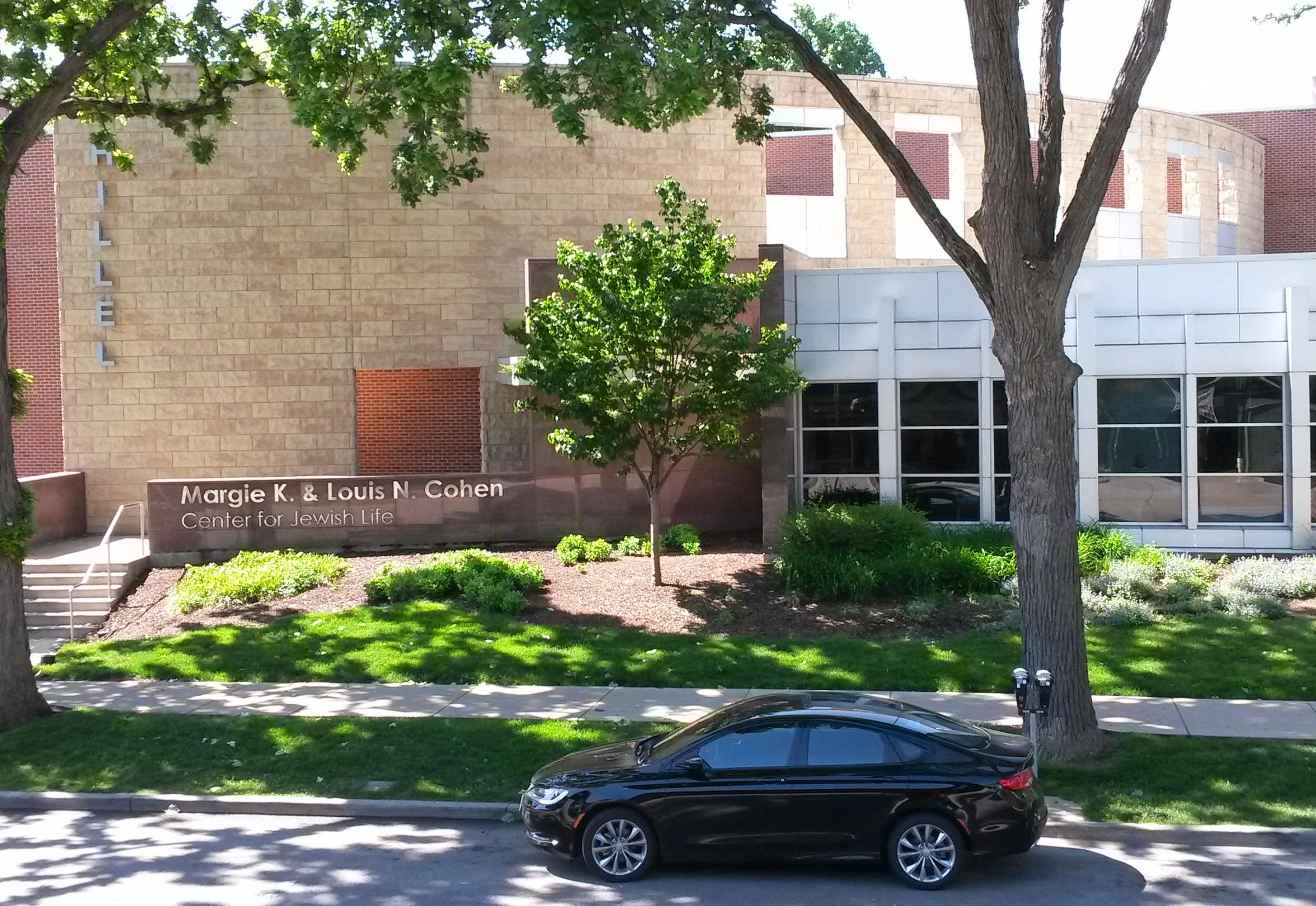
Cohen Center from John St.

Hillel at the University of Illinois Urbana-Champaign (also known as The Cohen Center for Jewish Life or Illini Hillel) is a Jewish university group, and was the first location of Hillel International. It was established in Champaign, Illinois, in 1923. As of 2024, the organization serves around 3,500 Jewish students and their peers at the University of Illinois Urbana-Champaign and Parkland College.

== History ==
Hillel International was founded at the University of Illinois Urbana-Champaign in 1923. In 1921, a small group of college students at the University of Illinois came together, led by a local rabbinical student named Benjamin Frankel. The 24-year-old, who was interning at Temple Sinai in Champaign, described his Jewish peers as being in a state of "intellectual flux".

As the children of recent Jewish immigrants, many were struggling to strike a balance between being American and being Jewish. Hattie Kaufman, a prominent woman in the local Jewish community, encouraged Frankel to reside in Champaign-Urbana as Sinai's part-time rabbi. He accepted a small stipend to remain in the area.

Frankel worked closely with the university's Jewish student population, comprising approximately 300 students, with the aim of strengthening students' dual identities. When he was ordained in 1923, the group began meeting more formally in a rented room above a barbershop on the south side of the 600 block in East Green Street, Champaign. Frankel reached out to the local B'nai B'rith for support, and campus leaders started to pay attention. In 1924, Frankel attended the national B'nai B'rith convention to garner support for Hillel. Edward Chauncey Baldwin, a non-Jewish English professor at the university, once challenged Chicago Jewish leader, Rabbi Louis Mann, asking: "Don't you think the time has come when a Jewish student might educate his mind without losing his soul?"

From there, Frankel, Baldwin, and Mann began working together and their fundraising efforts quickly developed the part-time student program into a full-time organization. The men managed to raise the first-year budget of $12,000 in a single luncheon. Frankel and a board of lay leaders named the organization Hillel, a tribute to one of Judaism's most prominent teachers. One year after agreeing to take the foundation under its wing, B'nai B'rith allocated $1 million for the expansion of Hillel throughout the country. Frankel was appointed as Hillel's first national director. The foundation reports that the social impact of Hillel was felt on the University of Illinois campus soon after the foundation's creation. Only 100 of the 350 Jewish university students in 1923 were willing to identify themselves as Jews during fall registration. By 1928, almost all of the 650 Jewish students enrolled identified themselves as such.

Rabbi Frankel's friend and successor, Dr. Abram L. Sachar, came to Champaign-Urbana in 1923. Until his resignation in 1929, Dr. Sachar served in the History department at the University of Illinois, specializing in modern English history. During that time, he also served as faculty advisor in Hillel and obtained a license to perform marriages at Sinai Temple and the Hillel location, because he was not an ordained rabbi. In February 1928, Dr. Sachar became permanent director of the Illinois Hillel chapter. In 1933, he became the first full-time national director, and continued until 1947. During this time, Hillel grew from nine chapters to 157 chapters throughout the United States and Canada.

By the time of his death in 1929 at age 30, Rabbi Frankel had helped establish chapters at University of Wisconsin, Ohio State University, University of Michigan, University of Southern California, and Cornell University, as well as the University of Illinois Urbana-Champaign. Today, Illini Hillel serves approximately 3,000 Jewish undergraduate and 500 graduate students.

== Building ==
From 1923 until 1950, Hillel used several buildings to host programs and events. Those same buildings served both as the home of the UI Hillel, and as the national Hillel headquarters as well. The first building was built solely for Hillel and was erected in 1950–1951. The building was designed by Max Abramovitz, an architect who designed the Assembly Hall and Krannert Center for the Performing Arts. After construction, the building was named the Benjamin Frankel Memorial in honor of Frankel, who was the first director of the local Hillel Foundation. Among those attending the building's dedication was former first lady Eleanor Roosevelt. The building provided event opportunities to the Jewish student community, with the chapel seating 100 for religious services and the auditorium accommodating for 300 for lectures, dramatics, social gatherings, and recreation. The library, seminar rooms, and social rooms were used by both students and the community. The building also housed kitchens and the caretaker's and administrative suites. The original Hillel Foundation offered more than twenty courses, for both graduate and undergraduate students, concentrating in Hebrew studies and Jewish culture and society.

Hillel's new facility, The Margie K. and Louis N. Cohen Center for Jewish Life, opened on December 4, 2007. The building was designed by the Chicago firm of Amstadter Architects.

On May 15, 2018, the Champaign City Council approved an honorary street name on the block between 5th and 6th street, where Hillel's buildings have been standing since 1949.
