= Congregation Neveh Shalom =

Synagogue in Portland, Oregon

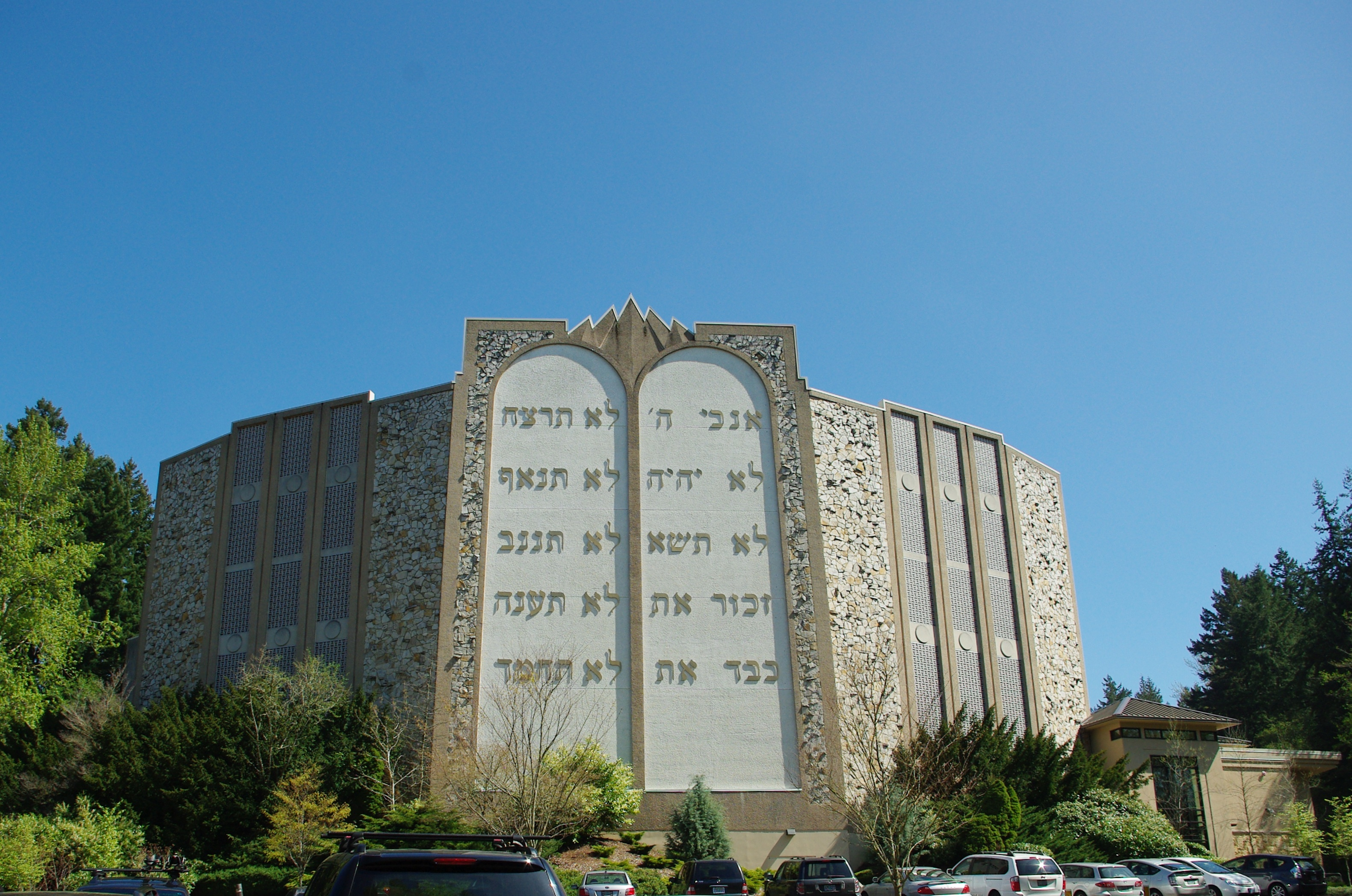
- Neveh Shalom in the Hillsdale neighborhood. The modern building was built in 1965 and remodeled in 2008.

- Location in Portland, Oregon

Religion
- Affiliation: Conservative Judaism
- Ecclesiastical or organisational status: Synagogue
- Leadership: Rabbi Eve Posen (Senior); Rabbi Daniel Isaak (Emeritus); Cantor Eyal Bitton; Rabbi April Villareal (Interim)
- Status: Active

Location
- Location: 2900 SW Peaceful Lane, Hillsdale, Portland, Oregon 97239
- Country: United States
- Coordinates: 45°29′01″N 122°42′21″W

Architecture
- Established: 1961 (Neveh Zedek and Ahvahai (sic) Shalom merger): 1869 (Ahavi Shalom); 1883 (Talmud Torah); 1900 (Neveh Zedek); 1902 (Talmund Torah and Neveh Zedek merger)
- Completed: 1904; 1911; 1950

Website
- nevehshalom.org

Congregation Neveh Shalom is a congregation and synagogue affiliated with Conservative Judaism, located at 2900 SW Peaceful Lane, in the Hillsdale neighborhood of Portland, Oregon, in the United States.

Founded in 1961 from the mergers of three older congregations, it has a membership of over 850 households. The early members of the synagogue were immigrants from Prussia or Poland, resulting in the nickname "Polisha shul." Despite the synagogue's nickname, it leaned toward the German styles of Judaism, rather than the Polish one. Neveh Shalom is the second oldest Jewish congregation in the Pacific Northwest and the oldest Conservative congregation on the West Coast.

== Early History of Neveh Zedek and Ahavi Shalom ==
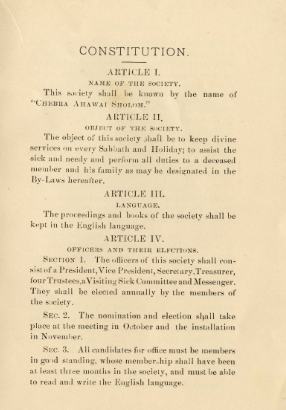
Constitution of Congregation Ahavai Sholom

Neveh Shalom traces its origins to two synagogues, Neveh Zedek and Ahavi Shalom.

Ahavi Shalom was formed in 1868 and founded in 1869. It was led for three years by Rabbi Julius Eckman. Rabbi Eckman had published Gleaner in San Francisco in 1858 which was the first Jewish periodical on the Pacific coast.

During these early years, Jews of Prussian and Polish ethnicity were the primary demographic of the synagogue. Ahavi was known as the Polisha Shul. After Eckman left, Hazzan Robert Abrahamson served as both the hazzan and the rabbi due to difficulties in finding a new rabbi. By 1889, Ahavi Shalom began conducting sermons in English instead of German. Ahavi Shalom was located on SW Sixth between Oak and Pine in 1899 and counted 65 members.

Congregation Talmud Torah was founded in 1895 and in 1899 was located at 260 First Street and had 50 members. Talmud Torah and Neveh Zedek merged in 1902, creating the synagogue Neveh Zedek. As the synagogue grew, the need for new buildings to fit the growing congregation arose, resulting in the construction of two buildings in 1904, 1911, and 1950. Throughout the 1920s, Neveh Zedek struggled to find a rabbi, relying on its cantor Abraham Rosencrantz, who served until 1936, the year he died. During this period, in 1921, Neveh Zedek joined the Conservative movement. Two years later, an arsonist set fire to the synagogue.

Ahavi Shalom was located at 146 SW Park Avenue where Edward T. Sandrow served as rabbi between 1933 and 1937.

After World War 2, an influx of Jewish refugees of the Holocaust resulted in Neveh Zedek's orientation shifting into a more traditional style. In 1953, a Rabbi Joshua Stampfer arrived at the synagogue. Rabbi Stampfer created a Jewish preschool which would later turn into a Foundation School. A year later, in 1954, Major Pruitt would come to the synagogue to learn about Judaism. Pruitt would organize weddings and bar mitzvahs, keep track of yahrzeits, and oversee the synagogue's kosher kitchen.

== Neveh Shalom (1961-present) ==
In 1961 Neveh Zedek merged with Ahvahai Shalom to form Neveh Shalom.

Rabbi Stampfer continued as rabbi of the merged congregation. During his tenure, Rabbi Stampfer founded summer camps, a preschool, helped establish the Oregon Jewish Historical Society and Oregon Jewish Museum, and taught at Portland State University where he was influential in the creation of PSU's degree in Judaic Studies.

In 1965, the religious schools run by the synagogue grew. Classes were taught on modern and traditional Judaism, and they discussed issues from a Jewish perspective. The rabbi would also lead book discussions.

Neveh Shalom came to be a center for Jewish life and thought in Portland. The synagogue welcomed Chaim Potok, Robert Kennedy, and Abraham Joshua Heschel to speak at the congregation in the 1960s. Kennedy would speak in May 1968 during his presidential campaign.

The congregation began to welcome female leadership in the 1960s. Min Zidell, who became a member in 1967, was the first woman to serve as a member of the board. The first female executive director of the synagogue, Carolyn Weinstein, was appointed in 1976. The synagogue elected in 1967 to treat women and men as equals within the synagogue. The synagogue, under the committee leadership of Elaine Cogan and Rabbi Stampfer, published its own prayer book in 1989, Oneg Shabbat which removed all gendered language referring to the divine.

By 2009, it was the largest Conservative synagogue located in Oregon. Neveh Shalom's clergy, Rabbis Bradley Greenstein and Joshua Stampfer, and Cantor Linda Shivers were part of the coalition of leaders who worked to establish the Portland Eruv that went live in November 2009 and encompasses Neveh Shalom.

Rabbi Daniel Isaak served as senior rabbi for twenty twp years before retiring in 2015. Rabbi Isaak was succeeded by Rabbi David Kosak who came to Neveh Shalom from Congregation Shaarey Tikvah in Beachwood, Ohio. Neveh Shalom had 850 member families in 2015 and 2,000 members in 2020.

Rabbi Eve Posen was hired at Neveh Shalon in 2014 as an associate rabbi, and succeeded Rabbi David Kosak as senior rabbi in July 2025. Rabbi Posen was officially installed as senior rabbi on November 15, 2025. In June 2025, the congregation hired Rabbi April Villareal as interim clergy.

== List of Rabbis ==
Names	Timeframe	Synagogue
Julius Eckman	1869-1872	Ahavi Shalom
Robert Abrahamson	1872-1937	Ahavi Shalom
Abraham Rosencratz	1920's-1935	Neveh Zedek
E. Charles Sydney	1937-1951	Ahavi Shalom
Phillip Kleinman	1937-1951	Neveh Zedek
Joshua Stampfer	1953-1993	Ahavi Shalom
Daniel Isaak	1999-2015	Neveh Shalom
Bradley Greenstein	1999-2022	Neveh Shalom
David Kosak	2024	Neveh Shalom
Eve Posen	2024	Neveh Shalom

== See also ==
- Culture of Portland, Oregon
