= Congregation Sha'arai Shomayim (Mobile, Alabama) =

Reform synagogue in Mobile, Alabama, US

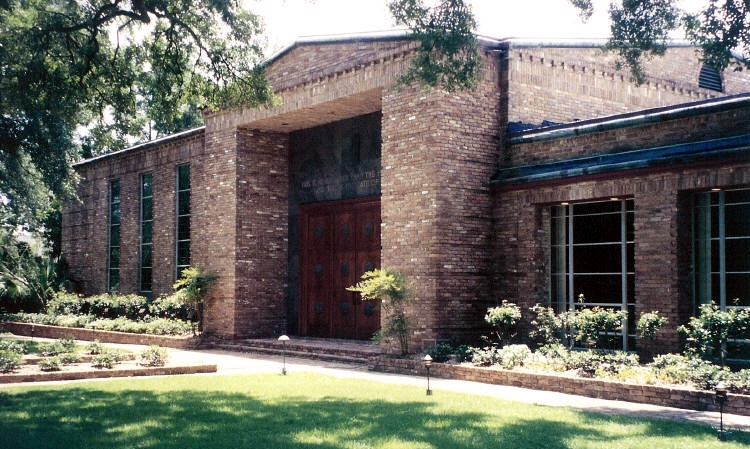
- The Springhill Avenue synagogue building, in 2003

- Location in Alabama

Religion
- Affiliation: Reform Judaism
- Ecclesiastical or organizational status: Synagogue
- Leadership: Rabbi Edward Boraz
- Status: Active

Location
- Location: 1769 Springhill Avenue, Mobile, Alabama 36607
- Country: United States
- Interactive map of Congregation Sha'arai Shomayim
- Coordinates: 30°41′28″N 88°4′58″W

Architecture
- Architect: T. Cooper Van Antwerp (1955)
- Type: Synagogue architecture
- Style: Modernist (1955)
- Established: 1844 (as a congregation)
- Completed: 1846 (Emanuel Street); 1850 (Old Musical Assoc. Hall); 1853 (Jackson Street); c. 1857 (location); 1907 (Government Street); 1955 (Springhill Avenue)

Website
- springhillavenuetemple.com

Congregation Sha'arai Shomayim (transliterated from Hebrew as "Gates of Heaven"), is a Reform Jewish congregation and synagogue, located at 1769 Springhill Avenue, in Mobile, Alabama, in the United States. Organized in 1844, it is the oldest Jewish congregation in Alabama, and one of the oldest in the United States. The current synagogue for the congregation is the Springhill Avenue Temple.

The congregation is a founding member of the Reform Union of American Hebrew Congregations, established in 1873.

== History ==
The first permanent Jewish presence in Mobile can be documented from 1763. Most of these early Jews were merchants and traders, having moved to Mobile after the French lost their North American possessions to Great Britain in the Treaty of Paris. Jews were not allowed to officially reside in colonial French Louisiana due to the infamous Code Noir, a decree passed by France's King Louis XIV in 1685. It is known that the code was rarely enforced in the colony, but there is no documentation of Jews residing in Mobile at that time.

The first prominent Jewish citizens of Mobile were George Davis, an Englishman from Tuscaloosa, Alabama; Dr. Solomon Mordecai from North Carolina; and Philip Phillips, an attorney from Charleston, South Carolina. Phillips was later elected to the Alabama State Legislature and then to the United States Congress. By the time of Phillips election to Congress in 1853, over fifty Jewish families were living in Mobile. Although no records survive that document the spiritual activities of Mobile's earliest Jewish citizens, on June 22, 1841, Congregation Sha'arai Shomayim purchased plots in the city's Magnolia Cemetery.

Despite the earlier purchase of burial plots, the congregation did not become officially organized until January 25, 1844, when a constitution and bylaws were registered with the Mobile County Probate Court. The constitution was signed by Israel Jones, president; David Solomon, vice-president; L.H. Goldsmith, treasurer; and D. Unger, B.L. Tim, and Roshon as trustees. The congregation's full name in the document is listed as Sha’arai Shomayim U - Maskil El Dol or Gates of Heaven and Society of Friends of the Needy. At the time of organization, the congregation had over fifty contributing members. They then began planning the erection of a place of worship.

== Early synagogues ==
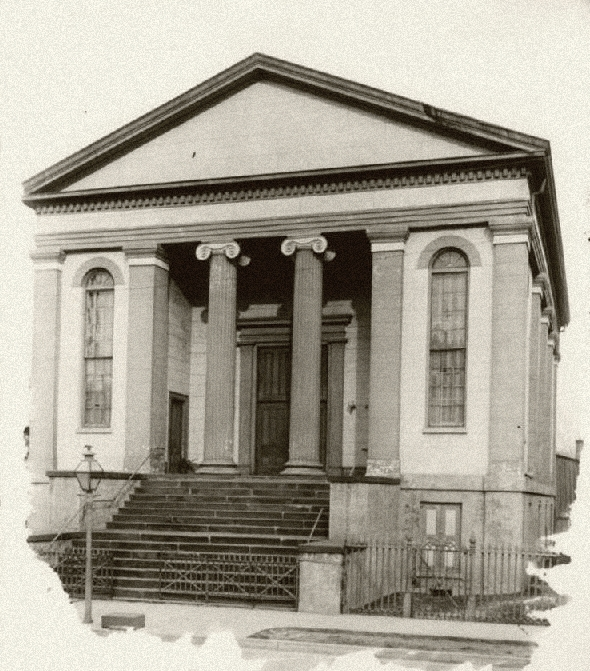
The second synagogue, on Jackson Street, in 1900; used by the congregation from 1857 to 1907.

During 1844 and 1845, Congregation Sha'arai Shomayim held services on Friday evenings and Shabbat morning in private homes. On March 13, 1846, the congregation appointed its first rabbi, Benjamin da Silva. On December 27, 1846, they dedicated their first temple, the Emanuel Street synagogue, located between Government and Church Streets. The first marriage ceremony was performed there on July 25, 1847. In late 1848, Benjamin da Silva moved to New Orleans and Baruch M. Emanuel was appointed to lead the congregation. By 1850, the need for a new house of worship was apparent and the congregation purchased the old Musical Association Hall, a building that could accommodate 300 worshipers.

The congregation had outgrown the Musical Association Hall almost as soon as they moved into it. On March 11, 1853, they dedicated their Jackson Street synagogue; built as a Unitarian church in 1846. Baruch Emanuel gave up leading the congregation in early 1853, before services had been held in the new building. Julius Eckman was appointed as the new rabbi but quickly fell into disfavor. He was succeeded by Dr. Isaac Schatz. The congregation suffered a catastrophe on December 11, 1856, when the new synagogue burned down. A stove in the basement caught the wooden building on fire. The congregation turned to selling subscriptions in order to rebuild on the same site. Several non-Jews contributed to the rebuilding, among them Dr. Josiah C. Nott and N. St. John. A month after the disaster the congregation published a thank you notice in the Mobile Daily Register to "our fellow citizens of Mobile" for their assistance after the fire. By the end of March 1857 the members had collected $3,555 in donations and on June 2, 1857, the congregation broke ground for a new synagogue. The new building was stuccoed brick in the Greek Revival style with Ionic columns.

== The Civil War years ==
With the coming of the American Civil War, Congregation Sha'arai Shomayim saw many of its members serving in the Confederate States Army. Men known to have served include Moses Holberg, S. Pickard, Adolph Proskauer, Joseph Proskauer, S. Rosewald, M.H. Rochotsch, L. Siegel, J. Sonnentheil, S. Stein, Nathan Strauss, and Leopold Strauss. Congregation members known to have died in the conflict include Joel Jones and Conrad Weill. The congregation created a Hebrew Military Relief Association with a mission of aiding Confederate soldiers and their families. Its initial assets were $1,416.

== Cemetery ==
The congregation's old cemetery in a section of Magnolia Cemetery was full by the 1870s, making a new cemetery a necessity. The congregation purchased land for the new cemetery, now known as Sha'arai Shomayim Cemetery, from William and Caroline Leinkauf on March 17, 1876. They adopted a number of resolutions for governing the new cemetery and placed the lot prices at $50 per lot. The new site, near Magnolia Cemetery, was consecrated on December 3, 1876. The cemetery was laid out by Samuel Brown, the congregation's vice president. He had live oaks planted around the perimeter of the grounds, and in 1890 the ornamental cast-iron gate and fence was installed. The first burial was that of Israel Jones, on December 28, 1876. One of the most notable interments to ever take place in the cemetery was that of Esau Frohlichstein on May 14, 1914. He was one of fourteen American soldiers killed in the U.S. siege of Veracruz during the Mexican Revolution. Thousands of Mobilians took part in his burial service and his marker is inscribed with a letter that he wrote to his parents the night before the attack. In part it reads, "Don't be afraid if I get killed. For the old saying 'Rather die a hero than live a coward' will land at Vera Cruz in about four hours."

== Later synagogues ==
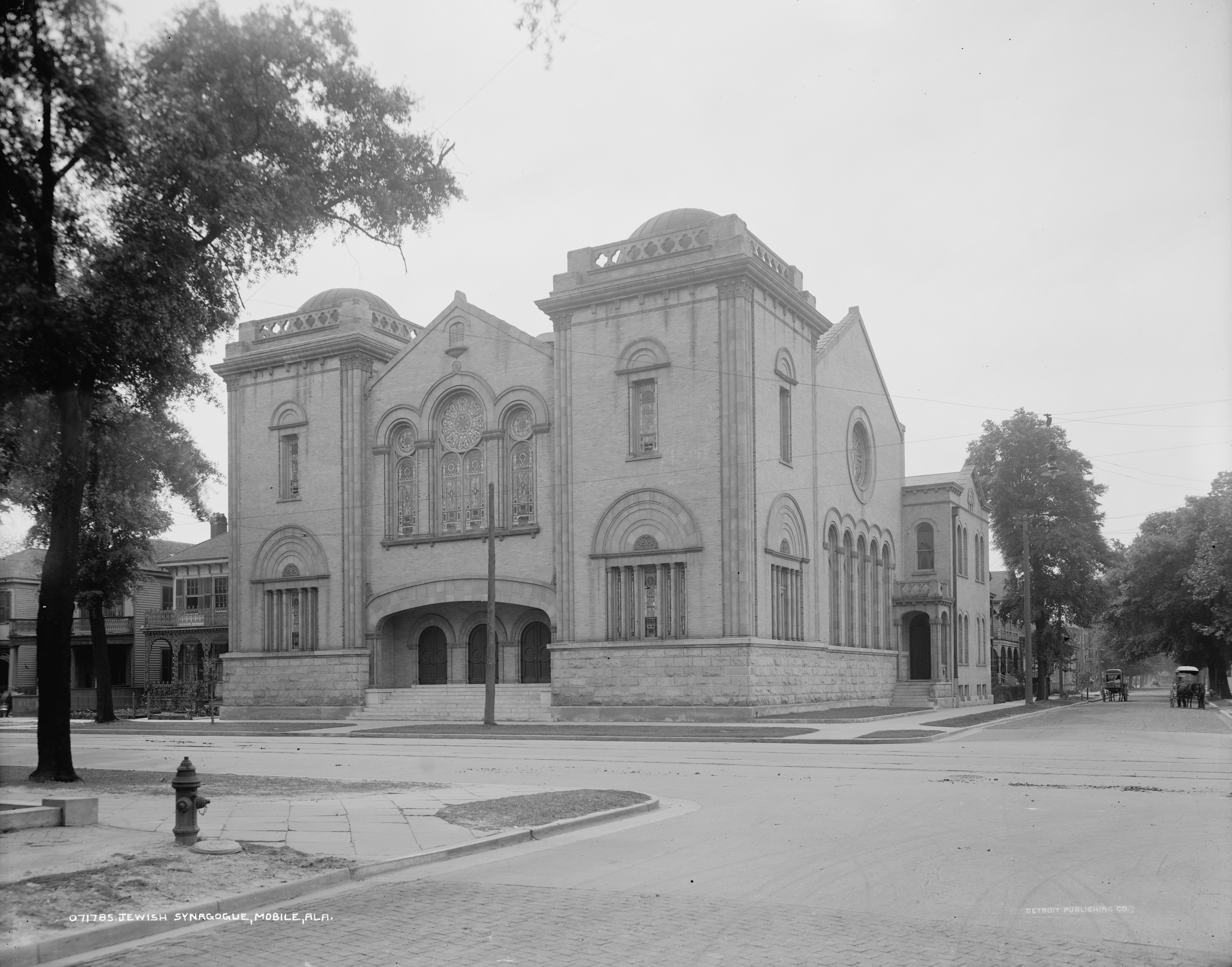
The former synagogue on Government Street, in c. 1910; used by the congregation from 1907 to 1952.

Adolph S. Moses served as rabbi from 1872 to 1881, later followed by Tobias Schanfarber from 1899 to 1901. Plans for a new and larger synagogue began to take shape in the first decade of the 20th century, with the cornerstone for the new temple laid on June 6, 1906, at the corner of Government and Warren Streets. Alabama Lieutenant Governor Russell McWhortor Cunningham was the featured speaker for the event. A building fund of $25,400 had been accumulated, but the congregation president, Jacob Pollock, estimated that $5000 more was needed to complete a structure that would "honor the Jewish population of Mobile." Construction continued and the new Government Street Temple was dedicated on June 21, 1907. The bold design was built like a fortress, with two large corner towers that framed an entrance, recessed into a deep and wide low arch. The dedication had been delayed by a week due to the organ not being completed. Eight rabbis took part in the dedication processional: Maximilian Heller of New Orleans; Henry Ettleson of Fort Wayne, Indiana; Bernard Ehrenreich of Montgomery, Alabama; Jacob Schwarz of Pensacola, Florida; David Marx of Atlanta, Georgia; Max Raisin of Meridian, Mississippi; Morris Newfield of Birmingham, Alabama, and Alfred Geiger Moses.

The Government Street Temple served the congregation for many years, but after World War II the population of Mobile was shifting westward out of downtown and the congregation found the Government Street Temple difficult to keep in good repair. After discovering that repairs would amount to more than $20,000, the building committee decided to sell the old building for not less than $100,000 and build a new structure. On July 18, 1952, the committee announced that it was buying a lot on Springhill Avenue for $40,000 and hiring architect T. Cooper Van Antwerp to design a new synagogue in the Modernist style, with a budget of $250,000. A groundbreaking ceremony was held on February 21, 1954, for the new temple. Then, on September 2, 1955, a dedication ceremony for Springhill Avenue Temple was held with Dr. Julius Mark, Senior Rabbi of Temple Emanu-El in New York City, delivering the dedication sermon. Today the congregation has continued to grow to its present size of about 250 families.

== See also ==
- List of the oldest synagogues in the United States
