= Benjamin Frankel (rabbi) =

American rabbi

Benjamin Moses Frankel (1897–December 21, 1927) was a rabbi and the founder of the world's first Hillel, at the University of Illinois Urbana-Champaign.

== Early life ==
Benjamin Moses Frankel was born to Julius and Lifshe Frankel, on September 15, 1897, in Peoria, Illinois. Frankel is a descendant of Meir Katzenellenbogen. Frankel married Florence Koenigsberg, but never had any children together. Frankel had three brothers named Harry, Samuel, and Mendel Joseph, and two sisters named Gittel and Gertrude.

== Work ==
Frankel graduated with a rabbinical degree from Hebrew Union College and was officially ordained in 1923 at age 26. Edward Chauncey Baldwin, an English professor at the University of Illinois, lobbied Jewish businessmen in Chicago, specifically Rabbi Louis Mann, to hire a rabbi and establish Jewish life on the University of Illinois campus. Frankel was appointed as the first part-time rabbi at Temple Sinai in Champaign, Illinois, as well as the first director of the campus ministry. He named the organization after the sage, Hillel, as a symbol of lifelong Jewish learning and pluralism. Frankel worked closely with a small group of Jewish students from the University of Illinois, many of whom struggled with balancing their two identities of being American and Jewish at the same time. They began by meeting formally, in a room above a barbershop in downtown Champaign. Even though Frankel and his students had a stable infrastructure, space, and a community-supported budget, over time, they realized that in order to sustain and expand their organization, they needed more support and resources, so Frankel reached out to B'nai B'rith for funding. Frankel convinced B'nai B'rith to adopt the organization in 1925. His fundraising efforts quickly developed the part-time student program into a full-time organization. It wasn't soon after that the University of Wisconsin (1924), Ohio State University (1925), and the University of Michigan (1926) opened Hillels on their respective campuses, as well.

== End of life ==
Frankel died of heart disease on December 21, 1927 at the age of 30. Mann took over Frankel's efforts until 1933. Over the next several decades, Hillel continued to grow, expanding to 200 colleges and universities including campuses in New York, Washington, D.C., Canada and Cuba.

David Kinley, first department head of Economics at the University of Illinois and later President in 1920, was an acquaintance and brief colleague to Frankel. He wrote in the Daily Illini and Hillel Magazine on January 20, 1928, “While my acquaintance with Rabbi Frankel was not intimate, I had learned to have a high opinion and a warm regard for him. He impressed me as a man of fine ideals, religious fervor, and fired with zeal for the young people in his charge. His influence in the community was all for what he believed to be good. We shall miss that influence in our University Life. We shall miss his kindly greeting, his hearty hand clasp, his cheery and encouraging smile. We have lost a man.”—David Kinley, President, University of Illinois.

== Legacy ==
Hillel, the organization that Frankel started, became his main legacy. Today the organization exists on 550 campuses across the world.

In May 2018, the Champaign city council voted in favor of giving an honorary street name to John Street, between 5th and 6th street on the University of Illinois campus. The segment of the street was named "Honorary Rabbi Ben Frankel Way" in August 2018.
