= Julius Eckman =

American Rabbi

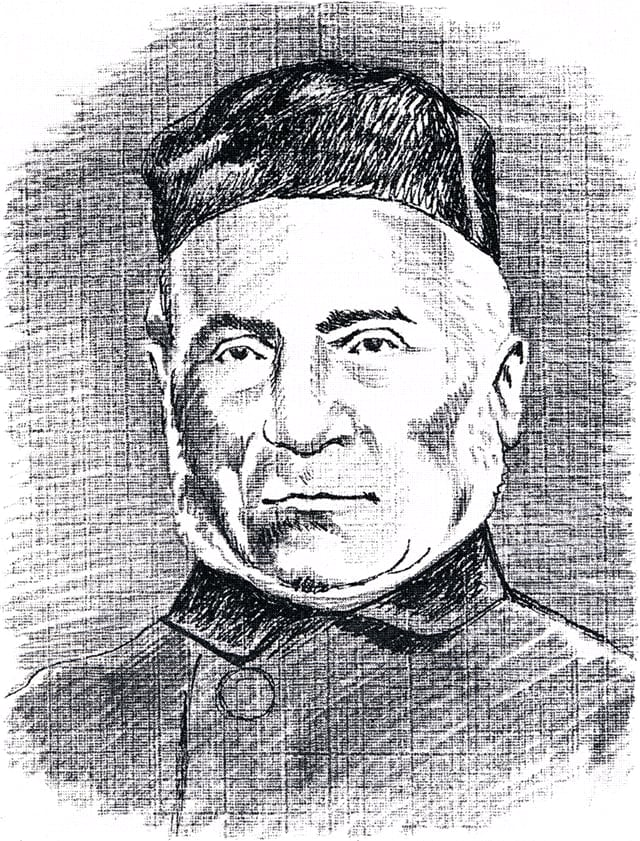
- Title: Rabbi

Personal life
- Born: 1805 Rawicz, Prussia
- Died: June 5, 1874 (aged 68–69) San Francisco, California
- Occupation: Journalist

Religious life
- Religion: Judaism
- Synagogue: Congregation Emanu-El

Julius Eckman (1805 – 5 July 1874) was a journalist and rabbi.

== Biography ==
Eckman studied at Berlin, and, after teaching for a few years, emigrated to Mobile, Alabama in 1846. Subsequently, he officiated in New Orleans, Charleston, San Francisco, and Portland, Oregon. Eckman established the "Gleaner" (in 1900 it was called the "Hebrew Observer") in San Francisco, and worked zealously to arouse the religious sentiment of the community. He belonged to the strict conservative school, and was noted for his scholarship.

== In San Francisco ==
Eckman came to San Francisco in 1854. There he was Spiritual Leader of Congregation Emanu-El for a year. His term was characterized by an uncompromising stand on ritual matters. It was this stringent outlook that resulted in his contract not being extended beyond one year. Eckman founded a religious school at Congregation Emanu-El. Even after he left the school functioned and was known as the Hephtsi-Bah School. He also ran a day school at Congregation Emanu-El, known as the Harmonica School.

== Publications ==
In 1857 Rabbi Eckman established an Anglo-Jewish weekly newspaper, The Weekly Gleaner. The paper remains one of the oldest and most reliable documents of Jewish history of the early West. The paper was also where the brothers Charles and Michael DeYoung, who went on to found the San Francisco Chronicle, first began work. They worked as typesetters for Rabbi Eckman's paper. The Weekly Gleaner underwent several name changes and mergers. It now operates as the San Francisco Bulletin.
