= Tamar de Sola Pool =

Israeli-American academic and activist (1890–1981)

Tamar de Sola Pool (Hebrew: תמר דה סולה פול; née Hirshenson; 1890-1981), was an Israeli-American academic and zionist who served as president of the Hadassah Women's Zionist Organization of America from 1939 to 1943. Born in Jerusalem to Rabbi Chaim Hirschenson and Eva (Cohen) Hirschenson, the family moved to New Jersey in 1904, and Rabbi Hirschenson became a congregational rabbi. In 1917, Hirshenson married David de Sola Pool, the rabbi of Congregation Shearith Israel in New York. She died in 1981.
