= B'nai B'rith =

International Jewish service organization

B'nai B'rith International
- בְּנֵי בְּרִית
- Predecessor: Independent Order of B'nai B'rith (and many others)
- Formation: 13 October 1843; 183 years ago
- Type: NGO
- Tax ID no.: 53-0179971
- Location: Washington, D.C., US
- President: Robert Spitzer
- C.E.O.: Evan R. Bernstein
- Vice Chairman: Bruce Pascal
- Website: www.bnaibrith.org

B'nai B'rith International (/bəˌneɪ ˈbrɪθ/ bə-NAY BRITH; from Hebrew: בְּנֵי בְּרִית, romanized: b'né brit, lit. 'Children of the Covenant') is an American 501(c)(3) nonprofit Jewish service organization and was formerly a cultural association for German Jewish immigrants to the United States. B'nai B'rith works to combat antisemitism and other forms of discrimination, and to promote Zionism and the State of Israel.

Although the organization's historic roots stem from a system of fraternal lodges and units in the late 19th century, as fraternal organizations declined throughout the United States, the organization evolved into a dual system of both lodges and units. The membership pattern became more common to other contemporary organizations of members affiliated by contribution in addition to formal dues paying members. B'nai B'rith has members, donors and supporters around the world.

== History ==
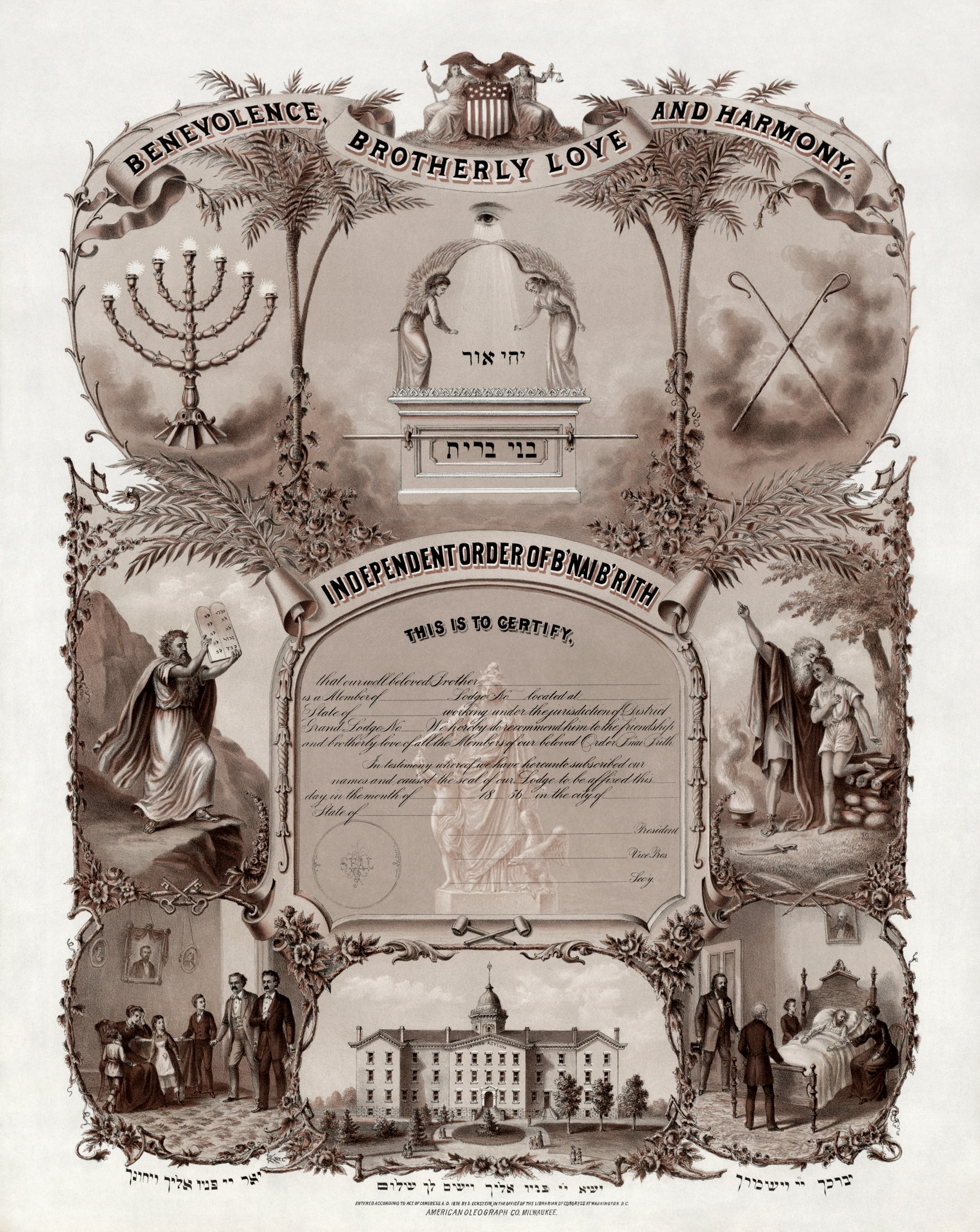
Independent Order of B'nai B'rith membership certificate (1876), the predecessor organization to B'nai B'rith International.

B'nai B'rith was founded in Aaron Sinsheimer's café in New York City's Lower East Side on 13 October 1843, by 12 recent German Jewish immigrants led by Henry Jones. It was organized as a secret lodge. The new organization represented an attempt to organize Jews of the local community to confront what Isaac Rosenbourg, one of the founders, called "the deplorable condition of Jews in this, our newly adopted country". The new group's purpose, as described in its constitution, called for the traditional functions performed by Jewish societies in Europe: "Visiting and attending the sick" and "protecting and assisting the widow and the orphan". Its founders had hoped that it soon would encompass all Jews in the United States, but this did not happen, since other Jewish organizations also were forming around the same time.

The German-speaking founders originally named the organization Bundes-Brüder (German for "Brothers of the Covenant") to reflect their goal of a fraternal order that could provide comfort to the entire spectrum of Jewish Americans. Although early meetings were conducted in German, after a short time English emerged as the language of choice and the name was changed to B'nai B'rith. In the late 20th century, the translation was changed to the more contemporary and inclusive Children of the Covenant.

Despite its fraternal and local beginnings, B'nai B'rith spoke out for Jewish rights early in its history and used its growing national chain of lodges as a way to exercise political influence on behalf of world Jewry. In 1851, for example, it circulated petitions urging Secretary of State Daniel Webster to demand the end of Jewish disabilities in Switzerland, during on-going trade negotiations. Into the 1920s the B'nai B'rith continued in its political work by joining in Jewish delegations and lobbying efforts through which American Jews sought to influence public policy, both domestic and foreign. B'nai B'rith also played a crucial role in transnational Jewish politics. The later spread of the organization around the world made it a nerve center of intra-Jewish communication and mutual endeavor.

=== 1843 to early 1900s ===
B'nai B'rith's activities during the 19th and 20th centuries were dominated by mutual aid, social service and philanthropy. In keeping with their concerns for protecting their families, the organization's first concrete action was the establishment of an insurance policy awarding widows of deceased members $30 toward funeral expenses and a stipend of $1 a week for the rest of their life. To aid their children, each child would also receive a stipend and, for male children, the assurance he would be taught a trade.In 1851, Covenant Hall was erected in New York City as the first Jewish community center in the United States, and also what is widely considered to be the first Jewish public library in the United States. One year later, B'nai B'rith established the Maimonides Library. Immediately following the Civil War—when Jews on both sides of the battle were left homeless—B'nai B'rith founded the 200-bed Cleveland Jewish Orphan Home. Over the next several years, the organization would establish numerous hospitals, orphanages and homes for the aged.

In 1868, when a devastating flood crippled Baltimore, B'nai B'rith responded with a disaster relief campaign. This act preceded the founding of the American Red Cross by 13 years and was to be the first of many domestic relief programs. That same year, B'nai B'rith sponsored its first overseas philanthropic project raising $4,522 to aid the victims of a cholera epidemic in Ottoman Palestine.

In 1875, a lodge was established in Toronto, followed soon after by another in Montreal and in 1882 by a lodge in Berlin. Membership outside of the United States grew rapidly. Soon, lodges were formed in Cairo (1887) and in Jerusalem (1888—nine years before Theodor Herzl convened the First Zionist Congress in Basel, Switzerland). The Jerusalem lodge became the first public organization to hold all of its meetings in Hebrew.

After 1881, with the mass immigration of Eastern European Jews to the United States, B'nai B'rithh sponsored Americanization classes, trade schools and relief programs. This began a period of rapid membership growth, a change in the system of representation and questioning of the secret rituals common to fraternal organizations. In 1897, when the organization's U.S. membership numbered slightly more than 18,000, B'nai B'rith formed a ladies' auxiliary chapter in San Francisco. This was to become B'nai B'rith Women, which in 1988 broke away as an independent organization, Jewish Women International.

=== Early 20th century ===
In response to the Kishinev pogrom in 1903, President Theodore Roosevelt and Secretary of State John Hay met with B'nai B'rith's executive committee in Washington, D.C. B'nai B'rith President Simon Wolf presented the draft of a petition to be sent to the Russian government protesting the lack of opposition to the massacre. Roosevelt readily agreed to transmit it and B'nai B'rith lodges began gathering signatures around the country.

In the first two decades of the 20th century, B'nai B'rith launched three of today's major Jewish organizations: The Anti-Defamation League (ADL), Hillel and BBYO (originally B'nai B'rith Youth Organization). Later, they would take on a life of their own with varying degrees of autonomy.

A growing concern in the 1920s was the preservation of Jewish values as immigration slowed and a native Jewish population of Eastern European ancestry came to maturity. In 1923, Rabbi Benjamin Frankel of Illinois established Hillel – an organization on the campus of the University of Illinois at Urbana-Champaign to provide both Reform and Orthodox Sabbath services, classes in Judaism and social events for Jewish college students. Two years later, he approached B'nai B'rith about adopting this new campus organization. B'nai B'rith sponsorship of the Hillel Foundations enabled it to extend throughout the United States, eventually become international and to grow into a network of more than 500 campus student organizations.

At virtually the same time as Hillel was being established, Sam Beber of Omaha, Nebraska, presented a plan in 1924 to B'nai B'rith for a fraternity for Jewish men in high school. The new organization was called Aleph Zadik Aleph in imitation of the Greek-letter fraternities from which Jewish youth were excluded. In 1925, AZA became the junior auxiliary of B'nai B'rith.

In 1940, B'nai B'rith Women adopted its own junior auxiliary for young women, B'nai B'rith Girls (BBG, then a loose-knit group of organizations) and, in 1944, the two organizations became the B'nai B'rith Youth Organization (BBYO).

B'nai B'rith has also been involved in Jewish camping for more than a half century. In 1953, B'nai B'rith acquired a 300-acre (120 ha) camp in Pennsylvania's Pocono Mountains. Originally named Camp B'nai B'rith, the facility would later be named B'nai B'rith Perlman Camp in honor of the early BBYO leader Anita Perlman and her husband, Louis. In 1976, a second camp was added near Madison, Wis. Named after the founder of AZA, the camp became known as B'nai B'rith Beber Camp. In 2010, Beber Camp became independent of B'nai B'rith. Perlman Camp functions as both a Jewish children's camp and as a leadership training facility.

In 1938 B'nai B'rith established the Vocational Service Bureau to guide young people into careers. This evolved into the B'nai B'rith Career and Counseling Service, an agency that provided vocational testing and counseling, and published career guides. In the mid-1980s, the program was dissolved or merged into other community agencies.

=== 1977 Hanafi siege ===
On 9–11 March 1977, three buildings in Washington, D.C., including the headquarters of B'nai B'rith, were seized by 12 black nationalist Nation of Islam gunmen, led by Hamaas Abdul Khaalis, who took 149 hostages and killed a radio journalist and a police officer. After a 39-hour standoff, all other hostages were released from the District Building (the city hall; now called the John A. Wilson Building), B'nai B'rith headquarters, and the Islamic Center of Washington.

The gunmen had several demands. They "wanted the government to hand over a group of men who had been convicted of killing seven relatives—mostly children—of takeover leader Hamaas Khaalis. They also demanded that the movie Mohammad, Messenger of God be destroyed because they considered it sacrilegious."

Time magazine noted: "That the toll was not higher was in part a tribute to the primary tactic U.S. law enforcement officials are now using to thwart terrorists—patience. But most of all, perhaps, it was due to the courageous intervention of three Muslim ambassadors, Egypt's Ashraf Ghorbal, Pakistan's Sahabzada Yaqub-Khan and Iran's Ardeshir Zahedi."

== Leadership ==
B'nai B'rith is led by an international president and professional executive leadership. As of July 2026, Robert B. Spitzer is international president, while Daniel S. Mariaschin is executive vice president and chief executive officer.

In July 2026, B'nai B'rith announced that Evan R. Bernstein would succeed Daniel S. Mariaschin as chief executive officer starting late August. Mariaschin retired after 27 years as CEO.

== Community service ==
From its earliest days, a hallmark of the organization's local efforts was service to the communities in which members reside. In 1852, that meant raising money for the first Jewish hospital in Philadelphia.

With the ageing of the American Jewish population, service to seniors became a major focus with the first of what was to become a network of 35 senior residence buildings in more than 27 communities across the United States and more internationally; this made B'nai B'rith the largest national Jewish sponsor of housing for seniors. The U.S. facilities, built in partnership with the Department of Housing and Urban Development (HUD), provide housing to more than 5,000 men and women of limited income, age 62 and over, of all races and religions. Residents pay a federally mandated rent based upon income.

The beginning of the 21st century also saw the senior service program expand and become the Center for Senior Services.

B'nai B'rith also includes, on its domestic agenda, tolerance issues such as advocating for hate crimes legislation as well as sponsoring a youth writing challenge, Diverse Minds. This annual writing contest asks high school students to create a children's book dedicated to the message of ending intolerance and bigotry. Winners earn college scholarships and the publication and distribution of their books to schools and libraries in their communities.

B'nai B'rith also sponsors the Enlighten America program, the centerpiece of which is a pledge that individuals can take to refrain from using slang expressions or telling jokes based on race, sexual orientation, gender, nationality or physical or mental challenges that would serve to demean another.

=== Anti-defamation activities ===
B'nai B'rith's anti-defamation work is focused on countering discrimination against Jews, primarily in the form of anti-Zionism which it considers a form of antisemitism. It supports American legislation that prohibits anti-Israel activities including the BDS movement, which it considers a modern day Blood Libel.

The American-based international B'nai B'rith organization founded the Anti-Defamation League of B'nai B'rith (ADL) as a response to attacks on Jews in the United States. The announcement of the creation of the ADL mentioned the Leo Frank lynching in particular. The ADL is now an independent organization.

In Australia and New Zealand, the local B'nai B'rith has its own human rights section, called the B'nai B'rith Anti-Defamation Commission (ADC). It is dedicated to eliminating the defamation of Jewish people, combating racism, intolerance, and prejudice. It seeks to secure justice and fair treatment for all citizens.

B'nai B'rith also created the "None Shall Be Afraid" initiative to keep a focus on antisemitism and anti-Zionism in society. None Shall Be Afraid was inspired by the 1790 letter from George Washington to the congregants of Touro Synagogue in Rhode Island, where he quoted Micah 4:4, "Everyone shall sit in safety under his own vine and fig tree and there shall be none to make him afraid." The organization hosts an annual essay contest to spotlight the impact of antisemitism on college campuses.

=== Educational programs and publications ===
Since 1886, B'nai B'rith has published B'nai B'rith Magazine, the oldest continually published Jewish periodical in the United States.

B'nai B'rith also publishes program guides for local Jewish education programs and each year sponsors "Unto Every Person There is a Name". This program includes community recitations of the names of Holocaust victims, usually on Yom Hashoah, Holocaust Remembrance Day.

In 1973, the organization converted a former exhibit hall at its Washington, D.C. headquarters into the B'nai B'rith Klutznick National Jewish Museum. The museum featured an extensive collection of Jewish ceremonial objects and art and, for decades featured the 1790 correspondence between George Washington and Moses Seixas, sexton of the Touro Synagogue in Newport, Rhode Island. Although the organization's move from its own building to rented offices necessitated closing of the museum to public view, select pieces of the collection are still on display at B'nai B'rith's current headquarters and are available for viewing by appointment.

=== Scholarships ===
Every year, B'nai B'rith awards the Sally R. Schneider scholarship to a Jewish female graduate student who is studying in a field that will benefit humankind. The scholarship, which is worth $1,000, is named after Sally Schneider, a longtime B'nai B'rith member who was passionate about pro-Israel advocacy and women's education.

The annual "None Shall Be Afraid" essay contest awards scholarships to three incoming and current college students whose essays share personal experiences with anti-Semitism and their commitment to fighting hatred and prejudice.

Local B'nai B'rith lodges also award scholarships. B'nai B'rith Great Lakes holds an annual golf classic, the proceeds of which fund several college scholarships each year.

=== Philatelic services ===
In affiliation with the United States Postal Service, the B'nai B'rith Philatelic Service was involved in releasing a series of first day of issue stamps relating to prominent Jewish entrepreneurs, philanthropists, entertainers, and various Jewish organizations throughout the country.

=== Disaster relief ===
B'nai B'rith has responded to natural and manmade disasters since 1865, when it assisted victims of a cholera epidemic in what was then Palestine. B'nai B'rith later raised funds and distributed them to those affected by the Great Chicago Fire of 1871, the Galveston, Texas, flood of 1900 and the Great San Francisco Earthquake of 1906.

In recent years, the B'nai B'rith Disaster Relief Fund responded to the 2010 earthquakes in Haiti and Chile, the 2011 Japan tsunami and the multiple tornadoes and subsequent flooding that hit six states in the South and Midwest in 2011. B'nai B'rith also opened a disaster relief fund following the 2010 Mount Carmel forest fire and another fund to help victims of the worst drought to hit East Africa in more than 50 years.

In Haiti, B'nai B'rith raised $250,000 for shoes, medicine, health supplies and other needs immediately following the January 2010 earthquake that struck the island nation.

Following Hurricane Sandy in 2012, B'nai B'rith's Young Professional Network in New York immediately began assisting in the cleanup. Members descended upon the Rockaways, and over several days helped remove debris and sand from buildings, extract moldy drywall and insulation, and remove water damaged furniture and appliances from homes. B'nai B'rith has also organised several fundraisers for future rebuilding projects.

Working with IsraAid, a Zionist humanitarian organization which brings together Israeli and Jewish organizations to form coordinated responses in the wake of humanitarian crises, the B'nai B'rith Disaster Relief Fund allocated funds to survivors of the 2018 flooding in Japan.

The B'nai B'rith Disaster Relief Fund also helped after two US disasters, one in California and the other in Hawaii, in 2018. Wildfires struck communities in Southern California, and B'nai B'rith contributed to the disaster recovery by assisting with the costs of food, utility bills and medical supplies for the Idyllwild HELP Center. Normally, the HELP Center is a charity and thrift store that helps needy individuals and families with the costs of food, utilities, housing and other basic needs. In the aftermath of the wildfires, the center helped fire victims.

In May 2019, the B'nai B'rith Center for Senior Services (CSS) held its annual B'nai B'rith Managers and Service Coordinators Training meeting in Puerto Rico, which is still recovering from damage caused by 2017's Hurricane Maria. In choosing to hold the meeting in Puerto Rico, the CSS team wanted to contribute to both Puerto Rico's short-term recovery, by volunteering for a day of service with local non-profit organizations during their trip, and its long-term economic recovery, by bringing business to the island.

== International affairs ==
B'nai B'rith was present at the founding of the United Nations in San Francisco and has taken an active role in the world body ever since. In 1947, the organization was granted non-governmental organizational (NGO) status and, for many years, was the only Jewish organization with full-time representation at the United Nations. It is credited with a role in the U.N. reversal of its 1975 resolution equating Zionism with racism.

B'nai B'rith also has worked with US officials in the State Department, in Congress, and with other governments to support the efforts of the Organization for Security and Co-operation in Europe (OSCE) to combat antisemitism. With members in more than 20 Latin American countries, the organization was the first Jewish group to be accorded civil society status at the Organization of American States (OAS), where it has advocated for democracy and human rights throughout the region.

In addition to its advocacy efforts, B'nai B'rith maintains a program of community service throughout Latin America. In 2002, in cooperation with the Brother's Brother Foundation, B'nai B'rith distributed more than $31 million worth of medicine, books and supplies to Argentina, Uruguay, Paraguay and Venezuela following the economic disaster that struck much of Latin America. Through 2011 the program had distributed more than $100 million in medicine and supplies.

=== Europe ===
By the 1920s, B'nai B'rith membership in Europe had grown to 17,500, nearly half of the U.S. membership, and by the next decade, the formation of a lodge in Shanghai (number 1102) represented the organization's entry into the Far East. The Shanghai lodge established the B'nai B'rith Foundation Polyclinic in 1934, later renamed the Shanghai Jewish Hospital.

B'nai B'rith Europe was re-founded in 1948. Members of the Basel and Zurich lodges and representatives from lodges in France and Netherlands who had survived the Holocaust attended the inaugural meeting. In 2000, the new European B'nai B'rith district merged with the United Kingdom district to become a consolidated B'nai B'rith Europe with active involvement in all institutions of the European Union. By 2005 B'nai B'rith Europe comprised lodges in more than 20 countries including the former Communist Eastern Europe.

In 1943, in response to what would later become known as the Holocaust, B'nai B'rith President Henry Monsky convened a conference in Pittsburgh of all major Jewish organizations to "find a common platform for the presentation of our case before the civilized nations of the world".

=== Israel and the Middle East ===
Just prior to the creation of the State of Israel, President Harry S. Truman, resisting pressure by various organizations, declined meetings with Jewish leaders. B'nai B'rith President Frank Goldman convinced fellow B'nai B'rith member Eddie Jacobson, long-time friend and business partner of the president, to appeal to Truman for a favor. Jacobson convinced Truman to meet secretly with Zionist leader Chaim Weizmann in a meeting said to have resulted in turning White House support back in favor of partition, and ultimately to de facto recognition of Israeli statehood.

In addition to founding the Jerusalem Lodge in 1888, life in Israel has been a prime focus for the organization. Among the Jerusalem lodge's most noted contributions was the city's first free public library, Midrash Abarbanel.

In 1959, B'nai B'rith became the first major American Jewish organization to hold a convention in Israel.

In 1980, nearly all nations removed their embassies from Jerusalem in response to the passage by the Knesset of the Jerusalem Law extending Israeli sovereignty over the entire city. B'nai B'rith responded with the establishment of the B'nai B'rith World Center in Jerusalem to serve as "the permanent and official presence of B'nai B'rith in Jerusalem."

== Awards ==
The Presidential Gold Medal is awarded by B'nai B'rith every few years to honor the recipient's commitment to the Jewish people and the State of Israel. Recipients have included David Ben-Gurion, John F. Kennedy, George H. W. Bush, Stephen Harper and Golda Meir. The Gold Medal has been given to former Austrian chancellor Franz Vranitzky, Australian Prime Minister John Howard, former German Chancellor Willy Brandt and former U.S. presidents Harry S. Truman, Gerald R. Ford and Dwight D. Eisenhower.

The B'nai B'rith book award was established in 1970. The first recipient was Ronald Sanders for his work The Downtown Jews.

== Notable members ==
- Sigmund Freud

== See also ==
- B'nai Brith Canada
- World Jewish Congress
