= Hillel International =

Global Jewish student organization

Hillel: The Foundation for Jewish Campus Life
- Founded: 1923; 103 years ago
- Founded at: University of Illinois
- Type: 501(c)(3) nonprofit organization
- Tax ID no.: 52-1844823
- Headquarters: Washington, D.C., United States
- Coordinates: 38°54′17″N 77°00′59″W
- Region served: Worldwide
- President: Adam Lehman
- Revenue: $57,900,000 (2022)
- Expenses: $52,700,000 (2022)
- Endowment: $12,151,129
- Employees: 1,200 (2014)
- Volunteers: (2014)
- Website: www.hillel.org

Hillel: The Foundation for Jewish Campus Life, alternatively Hillel International or simply Hillel, is an American Jewish student organization. Hillel brands itself as a safe space for Jewish students and events aimed at facilitating Jewish traditions on college campuses. Hillel describes itself as the "largest Jewish campus organization in the world". Founded in 1923 and headquartered in the United States, it is represented at higher education institutions and communities throughout Eurasia and the Americas, including in the former Soviet Union, Israel, and South America.

Hillel has faced criticism for its failure to welcome non- and anti-Zionist Jewish students. Critical academics have described Hillel as "a Zionist organization that determines who can be Jewish and how".

== History ==
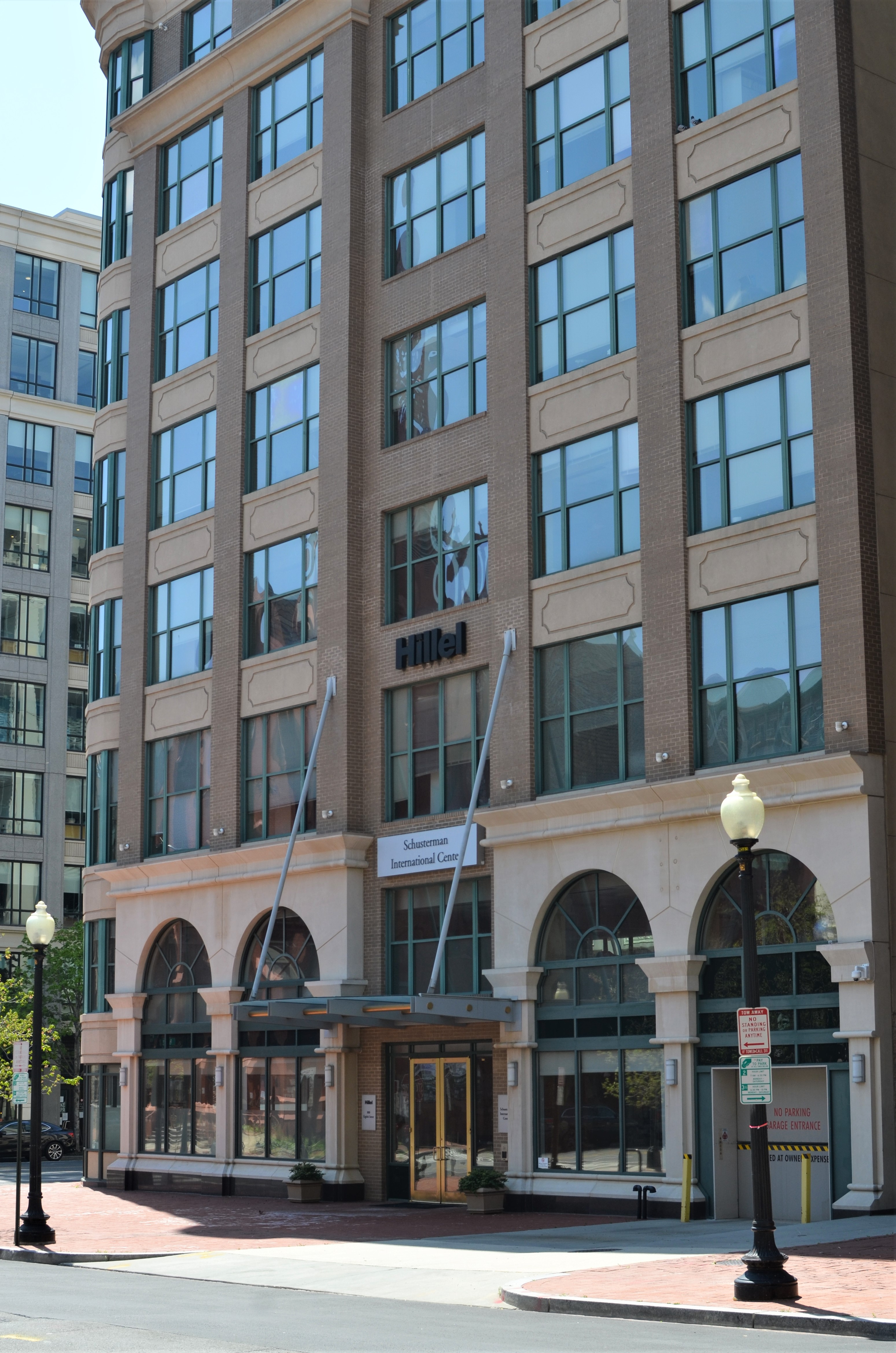
Hillel International headquarters in Washington, D.C.

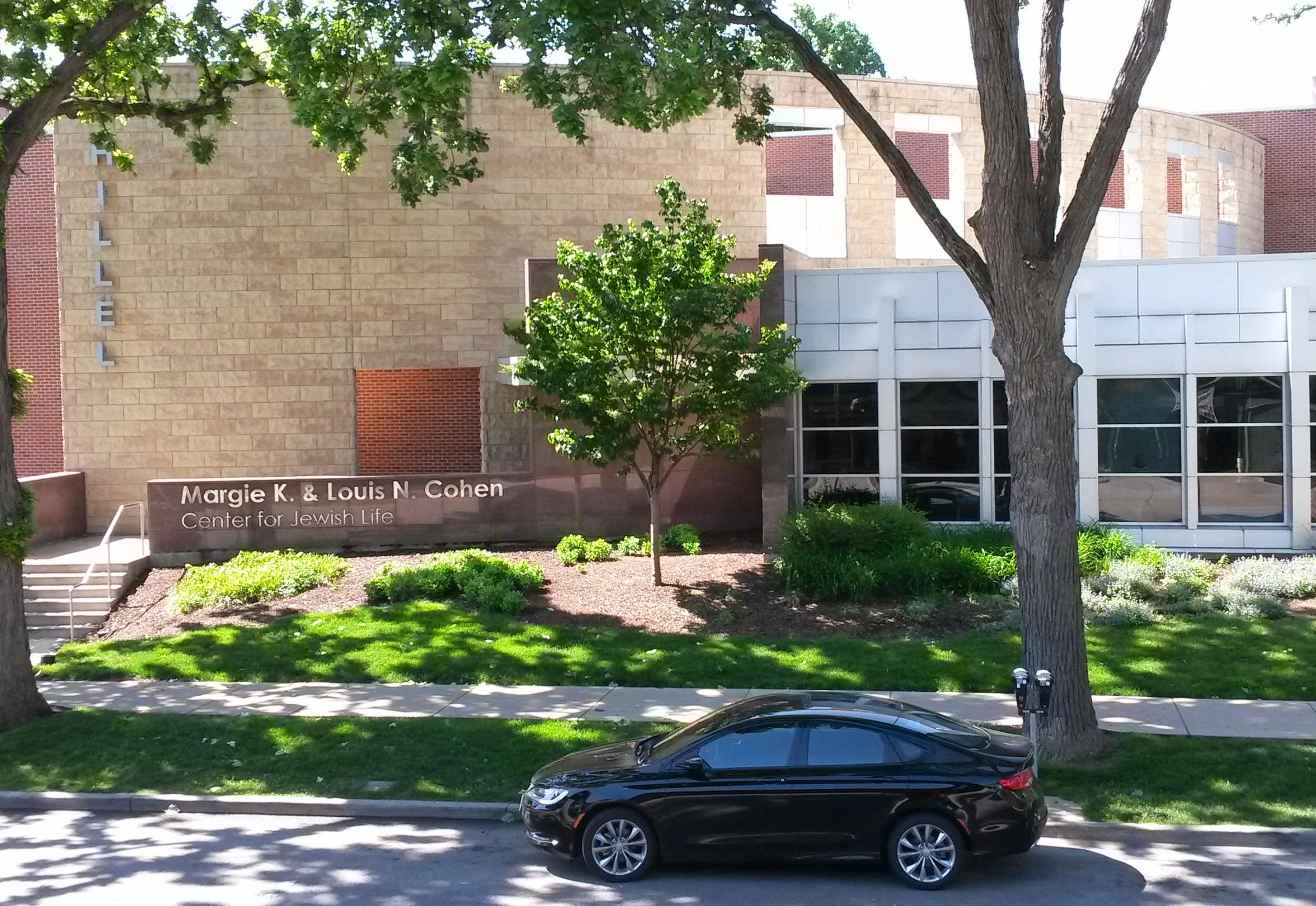
Hillel at the University of Illinois at Urbana–Champaign, the first Hillel in the world, in its current building built in 2008

In 1923, Edward Chauncey Baldwin, Christian professor of Biblical literature at University of Illinois at Urbana–Champaign was distressed by his Jewish students' lack of knowledge of the Hebrew Bible, and he discussed his concerns with Rabbi Benjamin Frankel.

Later the same year, members of the local Jewish and university communities met in a rented loft over a dry cleaner in Champaign, Illinois, and founded The Hillel Foundation.

In 1925, B'nai Brith pledged to sponsor Hillel's activities with a budget of approximately $12,000 that year. By then, it encompassed 120 Hillel foundations and affiliates at an additional 400 campuses.

Beginning in 1988, under Director Richard M. Joel, Hillel underwent an organizational shift in mission and structure. An integral part of this shift was the institution of a Board of Governors, chaired by Edgar M. Bronfman until 2009 when he was succeeded by Randall Kaplan.

Bronfman's involvement began in 1994 during a visit by Richard Joel to the Seagram building, when Bronfman pledged his support to Hillel. When Bronfman agreed to serve as chairman, Hillel gained legitimacy among other philanthropists. The subsequent revitalization of the organization resulted in increased donor support, updated programming, and broad international recognition. Part of the increased donor support came as a result of Bronfman's well-known campus visits, beginning in 1994, that continued until his death in 2013.

Hillel has been described as the largest Jewish campus organization in the world. Hillel foundations are found in Israel, South America, and the Post-Soviet States, and affiliated organizations are found in 18 countries across North America, South America, Europe and the Middle East.

Although the foundation was not organized nationally until 1923, the Hillel at Texas A&M University (at the time called the Agricultural and Mechanical College of Texas) was founded in 1916 by Prof. Jacob and Mrs. Esther Taubenhaus as the Menorah Club. The Menorah Club then chose to affiliate with the national organization in the 1920s.

Other notable Hillels include Hillel at the University of Illinois at Urbana–Champaign, the first Hillel in the world, Columbia/Barnard Hillel, and University of Pennsylvania Hillel, whose Steinhardt Hall is the largest Hillel International building of any college or university in the country.

In 1924, University of Pennsylvania's first Jewish student organization was organized by Philadelphia branch of the United Synagogue of America, Conservative Judaism's leading organization, and initially generically named the Jewish Students' Association at Penn and then, after the 1929 death of Louis Marshall, the Chairman of the Board of conservative Judaism's rabbinical college, Jewish Theological Seminary of America, it was renamed in his honor as the Louis Marshall Society but by January 1, 1944, when it merged with Hillel, it became known as Hillel and relocated to the “Jewish Students' House” at 3613 Locust Street (at center of Penn's campus) and served as a dormitory, Kosher dining room and a social center for Penn's Jewish students.

=== Leadership ===
Adam Lehman was appointed CEO of Hillel International in January 2020. He started at Hillel International as chief operating officer in October 2015. Lehman had been senior vice president at AOL. Skip Vichness is chair of Hillel International's Board of Directors. Mimi Kravetz was hired in 2015 to serve as Chief Talent Officer and is currently Chief Experience Officer. She previously served as head of human resources marketing at Google.

Hillel International Presidents and CEOs have included Rabbi Benjamin Frankel (1925–1927); Abram L. Sachar (1933–1948); Richard M. Joel (1988–2003); Wayne Firestone (2005–2013); and Eric Fingerhut (2013–2020).

== Activities ==
Hillel International says its mission is “enriching the lives of Jewish students so that they may enrich the Jewish people and the world” through its on-campus network. More than 800 colleges and universities are connected to a local Hillel community that serves as a faith community, a Jewish educational resource and a social network to develop professional leadership skills. Hillel uses a "relationship-based model" to engage students in need of a community. Hillel has no denominational affiliation, as opposed to Chabad which represents Hasidic Judaism.

Hillel employs more than 1,200 people worldwide, while providing extensive continuing education for its employees via a professional development program called the Hillel U. The organization also invests in early career professionals through the Springboard Fellowship. From 2011 to 2020, Hillel doubled its professional staff, from 575 to 1,200; the amount of funds raised, from around $90 million to about $185 million; and the number of students it reaches, from roughly 68,000 to over 140,000.

In September 2024, the organization launched the Campus for All initiative to support Jewish students on taking "action against antisemitism, discrimination, and misinformation about Israel on campus", alongside the MitzVote initiative to encourage voter registration ahead of the 2024 U.S. elections. In particular, this initiative aimed at resisting 2024 pro-Palestinian student protests that supported a Gaza ceasefire, Boycott, Divestment and Sanctions, or anti-Zionism.

== Policy positions ==
=== Antisemitism ===
Adam Lehman, Hillel International's president and CEO, has called his organization "radically pluralistic, inclusive, egalitarian home for Jewish students coming from all different backgrounds".

Hillel provides security training to local Hillels and engages in dialogue with university administrations about how to recognize and confront anti-Semitism on campus. Critics have suggested that Hillel conflates anti-Zionism with antisemitism.

=== Intermarriage ===
Former Hillel president Avraham Infeld was challenged in traditional circles for asserting that Hillel accepts Jewish intermarriage. The organization has since created resources for Hillel professionals to work with students from multi-faith homes. Hillel supports LGBTQ people and pluralism across the spectrum of Jewish movements.

=== Zionism ===
Hillel has extensive pro-Israel programming and employs post-graduate fellows from Israel from the Jewish Agency for Israel. Hillel is a major partner of the Birthright Israel program.

Hillel describes themselves as "steadfastedly committed to the support of Israel as a Jewish and democratic state with secure and recognized borders." Their Standards of Partnership forbid campus Hillels to "partner with, house or host organizations, groups or speakers" that adopt an anti-Zionist orientation or express support for the Boycott, Divestment and Sanctions (BDS) movement.

==== Open Hillel ====
In an alleged effort to be "more inclusive to a greater diversity of Jewish perspectives in addition to Zionism", Swarthmore College Hillel adopted an "Open Hillel" stance in 2013, saying that "all are welcome to walk through our doors and speak with our name and under our roof, be they Zionist, anti-Zionist, post-Zionist, or non-Zionist." By 2016, the campus Hillels of Guilford College, Vassar College, and Wesleyan University had joined Swarthmore Hillel in declaring themselves "open." Part of this involved a rejection of Hillel International's Standards of Partnership which they alleged limits open dialogue and freedom of speech.

In March 2015, Swarthmore Hillel held an event called "From Mississippi to Jerusalem: A Conversation with Civil Rights Veterans" in which they brought three Jewish veterans of the Civil Rights Movement to discuss their efforts to promote civil rights in the American South and in Israel-Palestine. Because the speakers had voiced support for BDS, Hillel International threatened legal action against Swarthmore Hillel, with the Chief Executive Officer Eric Fingerhut saying that "anti-Zionists will not be permitted to speak using the Hillel name or under the Hillel roof, under any circumstances." The student group removed the word "Hillel" from its title in order to proceed with the planned event, and subsequently adopted the name "Swarthmore Kehilah" (Hebrew for "congregation"), severing its association with Hillel.

In February 2014, the Vassar College Jewish Union, an affiliate of Hillel, also declared themselves to be an Open Hillel, and Wesleyan University's Hillel followed suit. Alumni at the University of California, Berkeley have also created a petition calling upon their school to do the same. In response to Open Hillel, a group of students formed "Safe Hillel" to preserve the pro-Israel agenda of the original Hillel organization. According to its founder Raphael Fils, "Hillel should not have to change its mission in order to accommodate those who don't agree with it. Hillel is the one place students are supposed to feel entirely comfortable in their support of Israel. If that makes some people uncomfortable, there are plenty of other places to go just to hear attacks on Israel."

While Hillels at Vassar and Guilford Colleges sought to distance themselves from the "explicit Zionism" of Hillel International, with Guilford Hillel renaming itself to Guilford Chavurah ("group of friends" in Hebrew) and Vassar Jewish Union placing an emphasis on pluralism and diversity, they did not go as far as the Swarthmore and Wesleyan Hillels had in choosing to fully split from the organization. Both Guilford and Vassar are still listed as "Hillel colleges."

== Controversies ==
=== Conflicts with Jewish critics of Israel ===
Some Jewish members and leaders of various Hillel chapters have criticized and objected to the organization's use of the motto "Wherever we stand, we stand with Israel" for "alienating Jewish students critical of Israeli policies, as well as for attaching a political ideology to an otherwise apolitical religious and cultural organization". Hillel was also accused of employing monopolistic tactics to "assume control over the Jewish campus scene".

In 2006, Fadi Kiblawi, a third year law student at George Washington University (GWY), held a lecture with columnist Will Youmans where they argued for the University to disinvest from Israel, and were critical of Israel's treatment of Palestinians, which was attended by several hundred students. The day before, the director of GWU's Hillel, Robert Fishman had sent an email to the Hillel listserv flasely claiming Kiblawi was "considered a terrorist by the state of Israel, and has been convicted of crimes in both Israel and the United States. He advocates for the destruction of Israel, [and] has also openly admitted to associating with suicide bombers and has made comments in the past about his desire to become a suicide bomber", and urged Jewish students to protest the lecture. An article in Washington Jewish Week noted that Kiblawi had been arrested by the IDF during a 2004 protest against the West Bank separation wall, but was not convicted of any crime, and could not verify any of Fishman's other claims. Kiblawi filed a harassment report with the University Police and said he planned to sue for libel if the statements were not retracted. Subsequently, Fishman sent a second email, writing of his first email "Regrettably, that correspondence included an unfortunate characterization of [Kiblawi]," and "The Hillel listserv is not an appropriate venue to express personal opinions. I apologize for any discomfort this may have caused members of the community."

In 2014, a petition was signed by 60 tenured professors at Princeton University which called on the University to "divest from all companies which contribute to or profit from" Israel's occupation of the West Bank, specifically naming Motorola, Caterpillar, and Hewlett-Packard. Rabbi Julie Roth, the executive director of the school's Hillel chapter, which is known as the Center for Jewish Life (CJL), set out a mass email urging the group's members to oppose the petition, and promoting a student counter-petition. This action was opposed by many CJL members, 38 of whom, including two CJL student board members, published an open letter in The Daily Princetonian, criticizing Roth for expecting the community to oppose the petition unquestioningly, and objecting to the Hillel International's prohibition of member-chapters from hosting discussion with groups or individuals who support the BDS movement.

In March 2015, the Student Board President of Muhlenberg College's Hillel, Caroline Dorn, resigned in protest of Hillel International's rules which prohibit college chapters from hosting speakers who are critical of Israel. This barred Muhlenberg's Hillel from hosting four Jewish civil rights activists, Dorothy Zellner, Larry Rubin, Mark Levy, and Ira Grupper, who were on a speaking tour of U.S. colleges called "From Mississippi to Jerusalem: In Conversation with Jewish Civil Rights Veterans" to talk about their experiences in the civil rights movement of the 1960s in relation to their advocacy for justice in Israel and Palestine. In her resignation, Dorn said, "I can't be a representative of Hillel International, an organization that I feel is limiting free speech on our campus and prohibiting academic integrity." The director of Muhlenberg’s Hillel chapter, Rabbi Melissa Simon, "stood behind the decision not to host the civil rights speakers." The event was held without the sponsorship of Hillel International and drew an estimated 100 attendees.

In January 2016, Boston University Hillel hosted a public event called "All Students, All Israel Think Tank" which included a discussion on "combatting BDS." The event was advertised as being open to the entire student body and offered optional advance registration. Nine students who showed up to the event, some of who had registered ahead of time, were ejected by campus police. Of those nine, three were of Palestinian origin, six were Muslim, and seven were members of Students for Justice in Palestine, including one Jewish member. When asked why they weren’t allowed to attend the event, campus police told the students "you’re not welcome" and threatened them with criminal trespass. Following an investigation, BU's Equal Opportunity Office found that the students should not have been removed, and had done nothing disruptive, stating that the Hillel event "should have been open to all BU students", and the campus police had been asked to remove the students "based on a vague assumption that they would be disruptive" but also "determined that there was not sufficient evidence to conclude [this] was due to discriminatory motives."

In March 2017, a queer Jewish student organization called B'nai Keshet (“Children of the Rainbow”) affiliated with the Ohio State University chapter of Hillel hosted a campus fundraising event for queer refugees in partnership with the local chapter of Jewish Voice for Peace (JVP), a Jewish anti-Zionist organization. Hillel International cut all financial and organizational ties with B'nai Keshet following the event, explaining that it violated the Hillel International Standards of Partnership due to JVP's pro-BDS stance.

=== Avraham Burg ===
In November 2013, Harvard Hillel barred Avraham Burg, former Speaker of the Israeli Knesset, from speaking at the Hillel building due to the event's co-sponsorship by the Harvard Palestinian Solidarity Committee, which advocates for BDS policies, despite the fact that it was also co-sponsored J Street U Harvard as well as two Hillel-affiliated groups, Harvard Students for Israel and Harvard College Progressive Jewish Alliance. Sandra Korn, a co-president of Harvard Students for Israel, board member on three Hillel-affiliated groups, and a former Hillel president, said "the idea that pro-Palestinian voices are not allowed to speak at the Hillel is a naked attack on free speech".

=== Nir Barkat ===
In April 2016, the San Francisco chapter of Hillel hosted a talk by Jerusalem Mayor Nir Barkat at San Francisco State University. The event was protested by a group of students led by members of the General Union of Palestinian Students, who interrupted his speech, shouting slogans and demanding that Barkat leave the campus. In a statement later issued by the group, they explained the reasons for their protest, stating "we objected to the event that served in justifying and whitewashing apartheid and normalizing violations of international law", noting, among other things, Barkat's ongoing campaign to demolish Palestinian homes in East Jerusalem. Hillel characterized the protests as antisemitic, but this was later disputed by an independent investigation., which concluded that, although disruptive, the protest posed no safety risks, was targeted at the mayor for his political positions, and did not target Jewish students.

=== Virginia Tech harassment allegations ===
In September 2021, the Graduate and Professional Student Senate at Virginia Tech proposed a resolution demanding the university to divest from Israel. The proposers accused the Hillel at Virginia Tech of "harassing" the resolution's supporters, despite its exercise of freedom of speech as protected by the First Amendment of the U.S. Constitution.

=== I [heart] Hamas stickers ===
In November 2023, stickers were distributed on the University of British Columbia's Vancouver campus which read "I [heart] Hamas - UBC Social Justice Centre". Although falsely attributed to the UBC Social Justice Centre (SJC), a pro-Palestine student organization, the stickers had actually been designed by Adam Dobrer, a student hired by the Hillel BC Society to help in their efforts to "counter anti-Israeli sentiment on campus." The stickers resulted in threats being made against racialized students associated with the SJC, including threats of doxing. After images of the stickers circulated on social media, the SJC was condemned by conservative politicians including director of the BC Conservative Party Angelo Isidorou and former Senator Linda Frum, and who suggested members of the group should be charged with "the glorification of terror". Hillel BC later confirmed that its "independent contractor" was responsible for the stickers, and that Hillel had terminated its relationship with them. The SJC subsequently sued for defamation. The court found that the stickers had been created as "intentional mimicry meant to deceive, not political satire", and that it could be legitimately argued that they had harmed the reputation of the SJC. However, because the SJC is an unincorporated association without defined membership, it could not be party to the lawsuit, and the case had to instead be pursed with one of the group's leaders as the sole plaintiff. Therefore the court found that, because the stickers referred only to the organization and not to any individual member, he personally did not have a valid complaint and the lawsuit was dismissed.

=== Hillel allegations against critics of Israel ===
Robert Fishman, director of the GWU chapter of Hillel, arranged a group of his members to read out questions to former President Jimmy Carter during a Q&A session when he spoke on campus in March 2007 to discuss his book, Palestine: Peace Not Apartheid. One individual who criticized the group said their goal was to make sure Carter "faced only tough questions" about the book and that they had "successfully outgunned the microphones and managed to give some journalists this totally erroneous impression that that was how the student body felt about Carter" Fishman contended that nothing had been done to stop anyone from asking a question, and that he felt it was important that those "who may not be familiar with the Israeli-Palestinian situation [...] have the opportunity also to hear those areas that are questionable in the book." The Forward noted that "a video of the event, posted to the G.W. Web site, shows that Carter received several standing ovations and long stretches of applause. But an Associated Press story that ran immediately after the event characterized the audience as 'polite but mostly critical.'"

In October 2003, UCLA Hillel director Rabbi Chaim Seidler-Feller was accused by journalist Rachel Neuwirth of verbally and physically assaulting her on the UCLA campus. Eyewitness accounts were contradictory, with some indicating that Neuwirth did not provoke the incident, while others insinuated that she had. After over three years of litigation, Seidler-Feller reportedly provided Neuwirth with a letter of apology accepting responsibility for the alleged attack on Neuwirth in a legal settlement to end the dispute.

=== The New School Hillel chapter suspension ===
On May 1, 2026, the Hillel chapter at The New School in New York had its funding paused by the University Student Senate (USS), following an investigation by the Registered Student Organization (RSO) Compliance Committee found the chapter had "extensive ties" to international law violations. In a 38-page report, the committee determined the chapter had "direct and material ties to international law violations," including supporting the Oketz, Kfir, Golani, and Handasa units of the Israel Defense Forces (IDF), all of which have been found in violation international law by multiple human rights organizations, including the United Nations and the International Court of Justice. The report found that Hillel at Baruch College had organized several trips between May 2022 and January 2025 for students to volunteer at multiple Israeli army and air force bases.

The committee report stated,

"The clearest and most direct evidence of material ties between Hillel at The New School and foreign military activity is the Hillel on Base (HOB) program, described on Hillel at Baruch's official website as follows: 'HOB (Hillel on Base) is a 7-day trip to Israel with all your best friends! Volunteer on an IDF (Israeli Defense Force) base in Southern Israel, wear IDF uniform, give back to the community on base, and explore Israel!' It is further described as 'a 10-day trip to Israel volunteering on an IDF (Israeli Defense Force) base. It is a once in a lifetime opportunity to help support Israel during this time' [...] Evidenced in a January 13, 2025 story post: 'Hillel on Base has made it to the IDF base! For the next week, our students will be volunteering alongside the IDF, helping out around the base and supporting the army.' This is Hillel's own unambiguous description of the program's purpose: direct support to the IDF as an institution, during an active military campaign formally found by the ICJ to pose a plausible risk of genocide, for which the ICC has issued arrest warrants, and which the UN Commission of Inquiry has determined constitutes war crimes and crimes against humanity.

The vote was the first instance of an American university's student government voting to pause funding for a Hillel chapter.

==== Reaction ====
Hillel International CEO and President Adam Lehman said in a statement that "The New School famously sheltered Jewish intellectuals fleeing Nazi persecution — and yet its student senate voted to deprive Hillel of funding unless it severs ties with Hillel International, the world's largest and most inclusive Jewish student organization."

Ilya Bratman, director of Leader Family Hillel at Baruch College, which oversees The New School's Hillel chapter, said, "this is a preposterous attempt to erase Jewish Life on campus and a blatant attempt to exclude and intimidate the Jewish community at New School," adding, "We will fight this injustice and absurdity with every tool at our disposal."

On May 2, 2026, Eric Dinowitz, Member of the New York City Council from the 11th district, wrote on X (formerly Twitter) "This is a direct attack on Jewish life on campus. @TheNewSchool must not allow the student senate to be weaponized to target their Jewish population."

On May 2, 2026, The New School's administration released an email statement rejecting the USS's actions, writing that the funding pause was "misguided" and an attempt to "target fellow students". The email was signed by University President Joel Towers, Provost and Executive Vice President for Academic Affairs Richard Kessler, and Vice Provost for Student Success and Engagement Robert Mack.

Ryder Glickman, chair of USS, said that the email was "anti-democratic", and a "blatant ideological act and a suppression of the movement for Palestinian Liberation on our campus."

In a statement to The Times of Israel, a spokesman for the school said "The New School's University Student Senate does not have the authority to determine the recognition, funding eligibility, or official status of registered student organizations", and "our Hillel chapter remains, as it always has been, in good standing, eligible for funding, and supporting Jewish life at The New School." The statement added "the administration is taking immediate steps to address the USS's action and ensure it acts within its actual purview, now and going forward."

The New York chapter of the Council on American–Islamic Relations (CAIR-NY) issued a statement on May 2, 2026 supporting the decision, writing, "We welcome The New School's decision to suspend funding for Hillel as a necessary step toward accountability and adherence to international human rights principles. Student organizations should be spaces that foster inclusion, critical dialogue, and respect for human dignity, not platforms that legitimize or support genocide."

On June 4, 2026, Prism published a report that the administration of The New School were now investigating student members of the USS who voted to cut ties with Hillel, alleging that was a “potential violation of Title VI of the Civil Rights Act of 1964". Glickman, who was among the students under investigation, said "The fact that there was such open repression and universal condemnation of the report shows that the administration’s response was coordinated with Zionist organizations accusing us of antisemitism. This is extremely worrying when we made a very basic case about international law."

== See also ==
- List of Jewish organizations
