= Tehilla Lichtenstein =

American theologian

Tehilla Lichtenstein, born Tehilla Hirshenson, (1893 – 1973) was a leader of Jewish Science as well as an author. She was born in Jerusalem and immigrated to America when she was 11. Her parents were Hava (née Cohen) and Rabbi Chaim Hirschensohn. She earned a B.A. in classics from Hunter College and an M.A. in literature from Columbia University.

She married Morris Lichtenstein in 1920. Together, they founded the Society of Jewish Science in 1921 or 1922.

Lichtenstein originally ran the New York-based religious school of the Society of Jewish Science, where she also taught Hebrew and Bible. She became the spiritual leader of the Society of Jewish Science when her husband, Morris, who had been its leader, died in 1938. Morris's will had declared that the position should go to one of their sons or Tehilla if neither of their sons were willing, which, as it turned out, they were not. Thus, in 1938, Lichtenstein became the first Jewish American woman to serve as the spiritual leader of an active Jewish congregation (though she was not ordained). On December 4, 1938, Lichtenstein gave her first sermon as the new leader of the Society of Jewish Science. It was entitled "The Power of Thought". According to the New York Times, which gave a brief notice to the event, over five hundred people attended the sermon. She continued to preach from the pulpit until 1972. She gave over five hundred sermons in all. She also took over her late husband's duties as editor of the Jewish Science Interpreter magazine, serving until she died in 1973.

She hosted a weekly radio program in the 1950s, which was a combination of practical advice and Jewish Science teachings.

Her papers, known as the Tehilla Lichtenstein Papers, are now held at the American Jewish Archives in Cincinnati, Ohio.
