= Morris Lichtenstein =

Founder of Society of Jewish Science (1889-1938)

Morris Lichtenstein (1889–1938) was a rabbi and founder of the Society of Jewish Science. Born in Lithuania, he later moved to Cincinnati, Ohio, where he was ordained by the Reform Jewish Hebrew Union College in 1916, becoming the first Eastern European student to study at the institution.

Lichtenstein served as a rabbi in Amsterdam, Troy, and New York City. He received a master's degree in psychology from Columbia University in 1919. He briefly served a congregation in Athens, Georgia, before moving back to New York to marry Tehilla Hirshenson in 1920. Together, they founded the Society of Jewish Science in 1921 or 1922. Morris became the institution’s spiritual leader.

After Morris died in 1938, Tehilla took over his post and thus became the first Jewish American female spiritual leader of an extant Jewish congregation. Tehilla did not receive ordination or hold any of the titles traditionally held by ordained Jewish clergy (i.e., rabbi or hazzanit) during her time in the role. She also took over his duties as editor of the Jewish Science Interpreter magazine, serving until she died in 1973.

== Bibliography ==
Morris Lichtenstein, Jewish Science and Health, (New York, NY: Jewish Science, 1925)

== See also ==
- List of New Thought writers
- New Thought
