= Jewish Science =

Judaic spiritual movement

Jewish Science is a Judaic spiritual new religious movement related to the New Thought. Many of its members also attend services at conventional synagogues.

Jewish Science is an interpretation of Jewish philosophy that was originally conceived by Rabbi Alfred Geiger Moses in the early 1900s in response to the growing influence of Christian Science and the New Thought movement. Rather than the paternal God figure encountered in Hebrew tradition, "Jewish Science views God as an energy or force penetrating the reality of the universe. God is the source of all reality, and not separate from but a real part of our world." His fundamental teachings are found in his 1916 book Jewish Science: Divine Healing in Judaism. The movement was institutionalized in 1922 with Rabbi Morris Lichtenstein's founding of the Society of Jewish Science.

== History ==
Thanks to radio broadcasts on WMCA and the establishment of the Jewish Science Interpreter magazine the movement attracted numerous adherents, thereby helping its rise to prominence in the Jewish community.

In 1938, Tehilla Lichtenstein became the spiritual leader of the Society of Jewish Science in New York, making her the first Jewish American woman to serve as the spiritual leader of an ongoing Jewish congregation, although she was not ordained.

Currently, the Society's "Home Center" and synagogue is located in midtown Manhattan, New York. The Society also maintains a congregation in Los Angeles California, and many study groups around the country which focus on each of the main texts of Jewish Science.

== Affirmative prayer ==
Jewish Science leader Morris Lichtenstein found affirmative prayer to be particularly useful because, he believed, it provided the personal benefits of prayer without requiring the belief in a supernatural God who could suspend the laws of nature. He considered affirmative prayer to be a method to access inner power that could be considered divine, but not supernatural. He taught that the origins of affirmative prayer can be found in the Hebrew Bible's Book of Psalms, and that affirmations, or affirmative prayers, are best offered in silence.

== See also ==
- Divine Science
- List of New Thought writers
- List of New Thought denominations and independent centers
- Religious Science
- Unity Church
