= Jacob Joseph Taubenhaus =

Jacob Joseph Taubenhaus (1884–1937) born in Safed, Palestine on October 20, 1884, was Chief of the Division of Plant Pathology and Physiology of the Texas Agricultural Experiment Station at the Agricultural and Mechanical College of Texas (now Texas A&M University) from 1916 until his death on December 13, 1937. During his life, he was also a leader in Jewish affairs at the university and was a founder of Texas A&M Hillel.

He graduated from National Farm School (now Delaware Valley University) in Doylestown, Pennsylvania in 1904. He received his PhD from the University of Pennsylvania in 1913 under the direction of J. W. Harshberger with his dissertation titled, "The Diseases of the Sweet Pea (1914)." Taubenhaus was hired as Assistant Plant Pathologist at the Delaware Agricultural Experiment Station at Delaware College (now the University of Delaware) in 1909 and was promoted to Associate Plant Pathologist in 1913. He held this position until 1916. He started his position of Chief of the Division of Plant Pathology and Physiology at the Texas Agricultural Experiment Station in 1916. He became a member of the graduate faculty of Texas A&M College in 1924. In Texas, he worked on diseases of a multitude of crops, including sweet potatoes, corn, onions, melons and tomatoes. With Walter Ezekiel, he published a check list of diseases in Texas. Much of his research focused on the etiology and control of cotton root rot, caused by the fungus, Phymatotrichopsis omnivora. With Walter Ezekiel, he published a study evaluating the susceptibility of more than 2000 plant species to this pathogen. At the time of his death, he had 91 major scientific publications. The standard author abbreviation Taubenh. is used to indicate this person as the author when citing a botanical name.

Along with his wife Esther, he founded Texas A&M Hillel in 1916, then named the "TAMC Menorah Club." Taubenhaus was a Mason, a member of the Botanical Society of America, Sigma Xi, and a charter member of the American Phytopathological Society. He maintained his position as head of the plant pathology and physiology division of the Texas Agricultural Experiment Station until his death in 1937.

He married Esther Hirschenson in 1910 and they had two children, Leon J. Taubenhaus, M.D., M.P.H. (December 29, 1912 - November 4, 1973) and Ruth T. Gross, M.D. (June 24, 1920 - October 16, 2007). He is buried in the Bryan (Texas) City Cemetery.
