= History of the Jews in Galveston, Texas =

Jews have inhabited the city of Galveston, Texas, for almost two centuries. The first known Jewish immigrant to the Galveston area was Jao de la Porta, who, along with his brother Morin, financed the first settlement by Europeans on Galveston Island in 1816. de la Porta was born in Portugal of Jewish parentage and later became a Jewish Texan trader. In 1818, Jean Laffite appointed de la Porta supercargo for the Karankawa Indian trade. When Laffite left Galveston Island in 1820, de la Porta became a full-time trader.

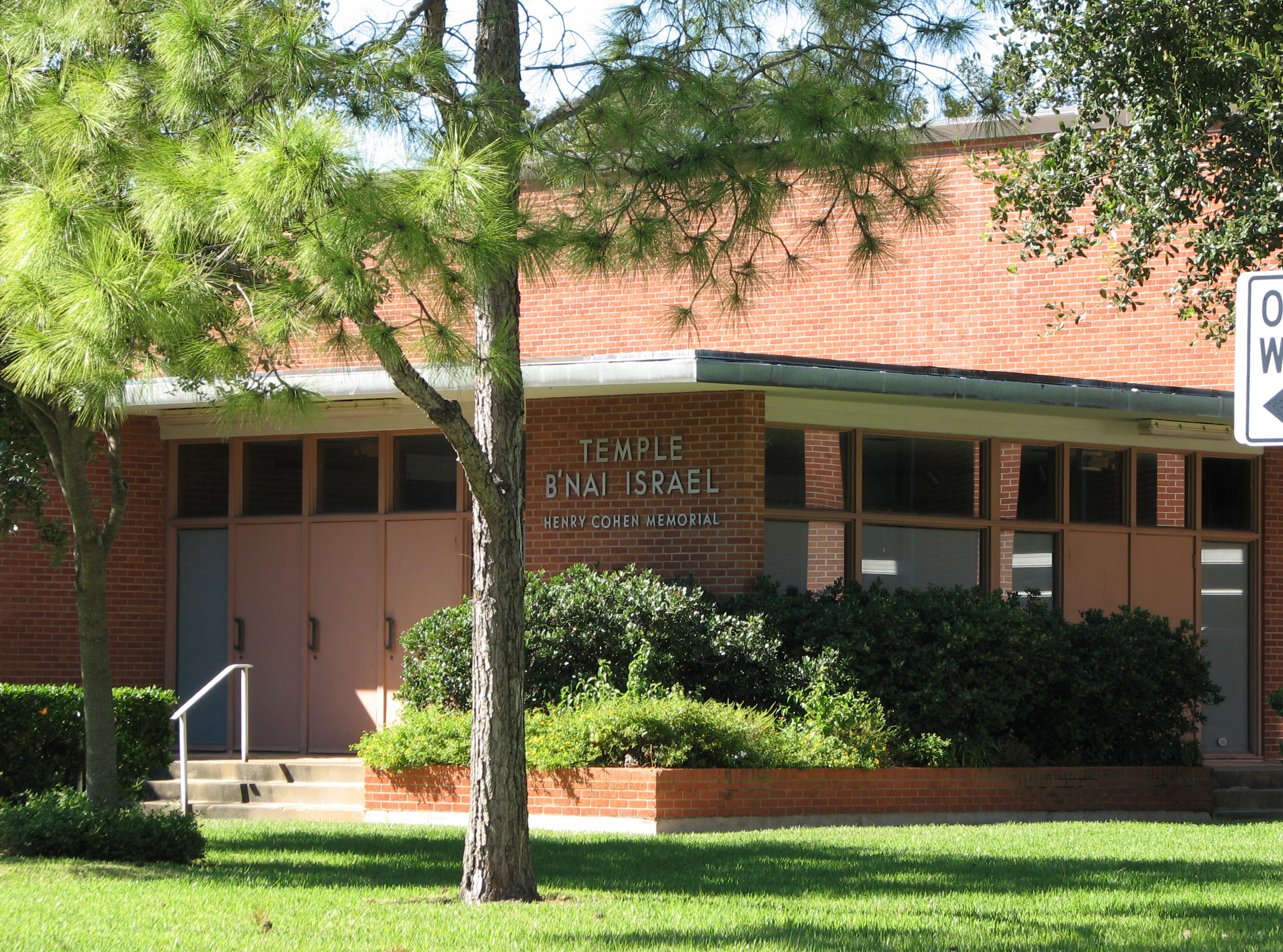
New B'nai Israel Synagogue

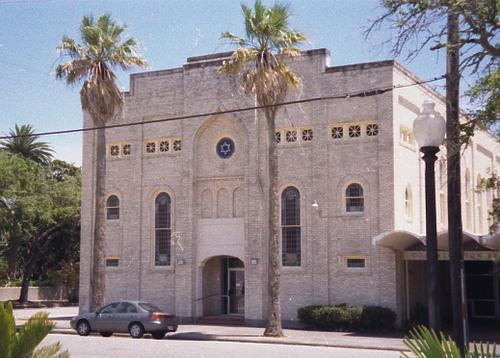
Beth Jacob Synagogue

In 1852, residents of Galveston established the first Jewish cemetery in Texas, with the first organized Jewish services being held in 1856. During the American Civil War, although most residents had fled the city of Galveston, Rosanna Osterman remained. In 1862 she opened her home as a hospital, treating first Union soldiers and then extending her care to Confederate soldiers.

Congregation B'nai Israel opened in 1868. The congregation was the first Jewish Reform congregation chartered in Texas, and only the second Jewish congregation founded in the state. On June 20, 1875, the congregation voted to become one of the charter members of the Union of American Hebrew Congregations. One of the pioneers of Reform Judaism in the United States, Abraham Cohen Labatt, moved to Galveston in 1878 and joined the congregation. He was an active member until his death in 1899.

On February 15, 1931, two orthodox synagogues, The Hebrew Orthodox Benevolent Association and The Young Men's Hebrew Association, merged to become Congregation Beth Jacob. Under the leadership of Rabbi Louis Feigon, the members raised funds to build a new synagogue on the site of the old Hebrew Orthodox Benevolent Association. In the 1970s the congregation joined the Conservative Movement in an attempt to attract more members. Today the congregation is small, but still active in the Galveston Community.

One of B'nai Israel's rabbis, Henry Cohen, helped found the Galveston Movement in the early part of the twentieth century. Between 1907 and 1914, the Movement endeavored to divert Jews fleeing Russia and eastern Europe away from crowded East Coast cities. Ten thousand Jewish immigrants passed through Galveston, Texas during this era, approximately one-third the number who migrated to Palestine during the same period. Galveston was chosen as an initial American port of call partly because it was already a destination for German shipping company Norddeutscher Lloyd, which operated out of Bremen, and because it provided and access to the growing economic opportunities of the American West. Two percent of the total Jewish immigration to the United States occurred via Galveston in 1911, representing 14,000 people. Within several years, however, local merchants began fearing the increased competition, and others were frustrated that Polish Jews would not work on Saturday. Several communities declined to accept more Jewish immigrants.

Cohen exerted influence on other areas of the community as well. He was instrumental in banishing Shakespeare’s Shylock from the Galveston public schools. The community recognized his actions on their behalf, when in 1928 Congregation B'nai Israel commissioned a new facility, which they named the Henry Cohen Community House.

The Jewish community in Galveston welcomed their first native Texas rabbi when Jimmy Kessler assumed leadership of Congregation B'nai Israel. Kessler later founded the Texas Jewish Historical Society.

== Notable residents ==
- Rosanna Osterman
- Jonathan Pollard

== See also ==
- History of the Jews in Houston

== Additional references ==
- Congregation Beth Jacob's Website
- Article on Jewish Texans by Rabbi Samuel M. Stahl
- Article on history of Jewish Texans
- Goldring/Woldenberg Institute of Southern Jewish Life. "Galveston." Encyclopedia of Southern Jewish Communities.
- Shapiro, Susan. "IN SHORT: NONFICTION; Home on the Range." (about the book Pioneer Jewish Texans) The New York Times. July 29, 1990.
