= Temple Beth-El (San Antonio) =

Reform synagogue in San Antonio, Texas, US

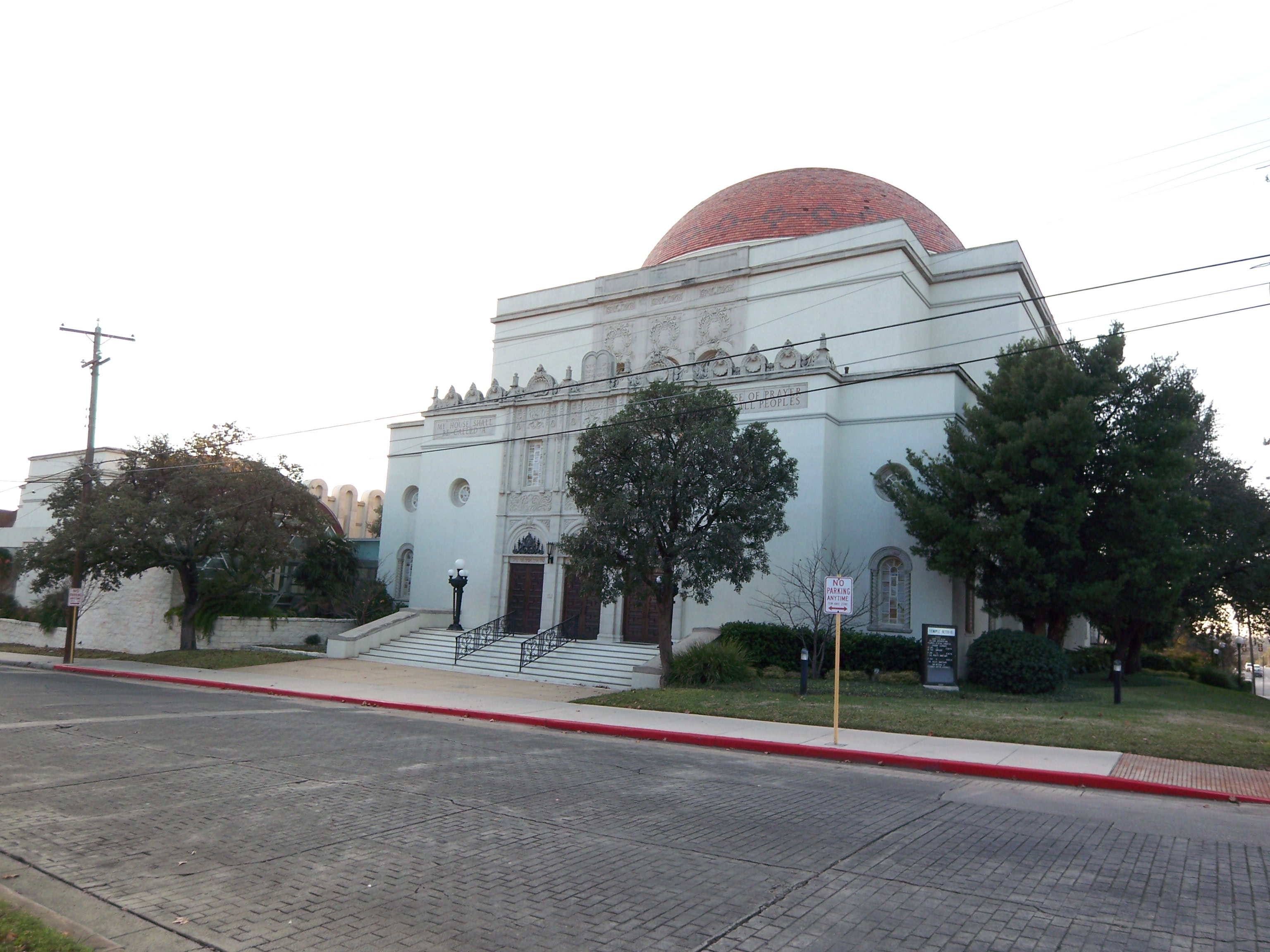
- Temple Beth-El synagogue in 2007

- Location in Texas

Religion
- Affiliation: Reform Judaism
- Ecclesiastical or organisational status: Synagogue
- Leadership: Rabbi Mara Nathan; Rabbi Marina Yergin; Rabbi Samuel M. Stahl (Emeritus)
- Status: Active

Location
- Location: 211 Belknap Place, San Antonio, Texas 78212
- Country: United States
- Coordinates: 29°26′55″N 98°29′52″W

Architecture
- Architects: Simon and Senter (1927)
- Type: Synagogue
- Established: 1874 (as a congregation)
- Completed: 1874; 1902; 1927 (current site)
- Construction cost: US$90,510

Specifications
- Direction of façade: East
- Capacity: 1,200 worshippers
- Dome: One

Website
- beth-elsa.org

Temple Beth-El is a Reform Jewish synagogue located at 211 Belknap Place, in San Antonio, Texas, in the United States. Founded in 1874, it is the oldest synagogue in South Texas.

Temple Beth-El is a founding member of the Union for Reform Judaism.

== History ==
=== Early history ===
In its early years, the congregation's practice was informed by the assimilationist ideals of the Reform movement, which emphasized social justice and ethical practice more than traditional Jewish ritual.

The opening of Temple Beth-El's first building in 1874 was celebrated by local church choirs singing together with the temple's. A second building was built in 1902; during its construction the temple met in a neighboring Baptist church, and in turn various Christian congregations held their services in the temple building for many years. From 1897 to 1920 the rabbi was Samuel Marks, who was an active participant in the civic activities of the state.

From 1923 to 1942, the congregation was led by Rabbi Ephraim Frisch, a prominent activist rabbi who was the son-in-law of one of Texas' best known rabbis, Henry Cohen of Galveston. Frisch was controversial for his outspoken positions on a wide range of political and economic issues: he opposed Zionism (as many Reform rabbis did at the time), supported teaching evolution in the schools, spoke against the poll tax, and advocated for workers' rights. After a particularly controversial public letter decrying a police raid and arrest of labor activists, the congregation ultimately forced Frisch to retire in 1942.

Frisch's successor, David Jacobson, had a less confrontational style but was also politically active. While serving as Frisch's associate rabbi in 1938, he chaired a city commission examining the city's economic and social issues. Jacobson served as a Navy chaplain during World War II. Returning after the war, he continued to be active in social issues, notably as a persistent advocate of racial desegregation in the city. Jacobson's tenure also saw the congregation make some moves away from the Classical Reform style of worship, adopting rituals such as the bar mitzvah and instructing students in Hebrew.

As the congregation grew, another new building had been opened in 1927, with room in the sanctuary for 1,200 worshippers, as well as a community center building with classrooms. This was expanded in 1946 with an auditorium, social hall and new chapel. When Rabbi Jacobson retired in 1976, the congregation had 853 families. Under the next rabbi, Samuel M. Stahl, it grew to more than 1,100 families by 1995. Barry Block became senior rabbi in 2002 and served until 2013, his tenure ending with a lengthy sabbatical after controversy within the congregation led to his negotiated departure.

=== Contemporary times ===
After a major hailstorm in 2016, the roof of the building's dome was replaced with Ludowici tiles, designed to match the originals during a four-month restoration project.

Still known as one of San Antonio's more contemporary places of worship, Temple Beth-El is very open in its support of the Jewish LGBT community and its long-standing commitment to social justice. Rabbi Mara Nathan became the Temple's senior rabbi in July 2014. The Temple is also served by Associate Rabbi Marina Yergin, and Cantor Seth Ettinger, as well as Rabbi Emeritus Stahl.

== See also ==
- Jewish Texan
- Oldest synagogues in the United States
