= Tibor Beerman =

American architect

Tibor Eliahu Beerman (August 13, 1925 – August 7, 2015) was an architect in the United States. His work, much of it modernist, includes synagogues, residences, and the 1966 Galveston County Courthouse. His brother died at Buchenwald, and Beerman wrote about his own experiences during the Holocaust.

Beerman was born to a Hungarian family in Berehovo, Czechoslovakia (which became Beregszász, Hungary again in 1938 and was made part of the Soviet Union after World War II, today part of Ukraine). He immigrated to the U.S. to study architecture at the University of Texas in Austin after surviving the Holocaust and World War II. He was Jewish.

He and Ben J. Kotin designed the Beth Jacob Synagogue sanctuary and halls when additions and remodeling were carried out in the 1960s (Raymond Rapp was the synagogue's original architect). He also designed the Congregation B'nai Israel synagogue in Galveston where he was a member of the congregation.

He was interviewed by the University of Southern California Shoah Foundation Institute.

Architect Louis Oliver and Beerman worked on a renovation project for the Old Central Cultural Center. He also designed residential projects such as the Baxter House at 1309 Harbor View with fellow immigrant Ben Botkin in 1964.

Beerman bore a tattoo with his identifying number from Auschwitz and was held in several camps during the war before being liberated by American soldiers.

== Works ==
- Galveston County Courthouse (1966)
- Congregation B'nai Israel synagogue at 3008 Avenue O in Galveston
- Beth Jacob Synagogue sanctuary and halls with Ben J. Kotin
- Baxter House at 1309 Harbor View with fellow immigrant Ben Botkin in 1964
- Old Central Cultural with Louis Oliver, renovation of a former school for African Americans
