= Congregation Beth Jacob (Galveston, Texas) =

Conservative Jewish synagogue in Galveston Island, Texas

- Hebrew: בית יעקב
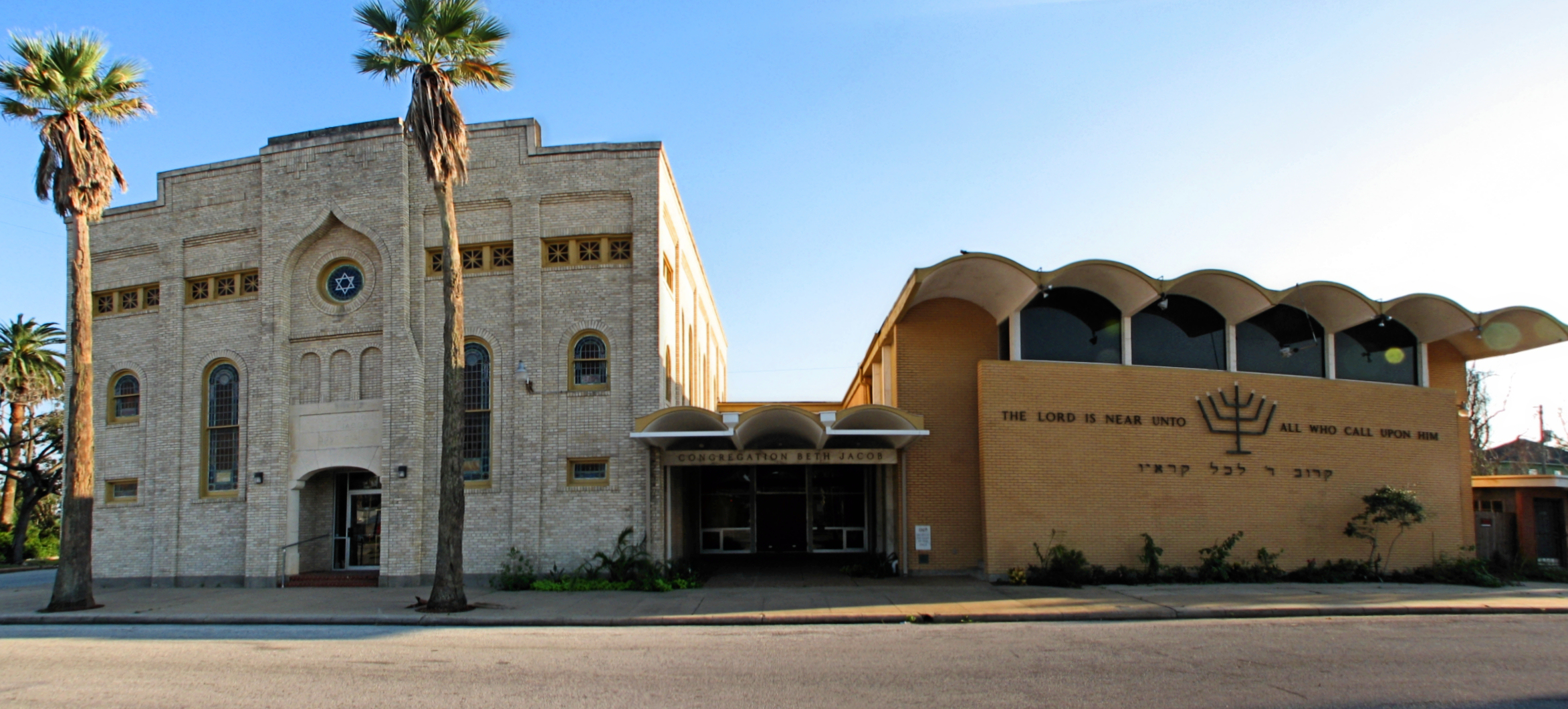
- Beth Jacob Synagogue

- Location in Texas

Religion
- Affiliation: Conservative Judaism
- Ecclesiastical or organizational status: Synagogue
- Leadership: Rabbi Todd Doctor
- Status: Active

Location
- Location: 2401 Avenue K, Galveston, Galveston Island, Texas
- Country: United States
- Interactive map of Congregation Beth Jacob
- Administration: United Synagogue of Conservative Judaism
- Coordinates: 29°17′55″N 94°47′34″W

Architecture
- Established: 1888 (as a congregation); 1931 (merger)
- Completed: 1931 (first building); 1965 (new wing)
- Capacity: 232 worshippers

Website
- galvestonshul.org

Congregation Beth Jacob (Hebrew: בית יעקב) is a Conservative Jewish synagogue located at 2401 Avenue K, Galveston, on Galveston Island, Texas, in the United States. The present synagogue was built by Austrian, Russian and Hungarian immigrants in 1931. It was listed on the National Register of Historic Places in 2024.

The congregation is small and active in the Galveston community. It is currently led Rabbi Todd Doctor. Rabbi Jimmy Kessler, of Congregation B'nai Israel, a local Reform synagogue, previously assisted the congregation with religious functions such as marriages and funerals.

== History ==
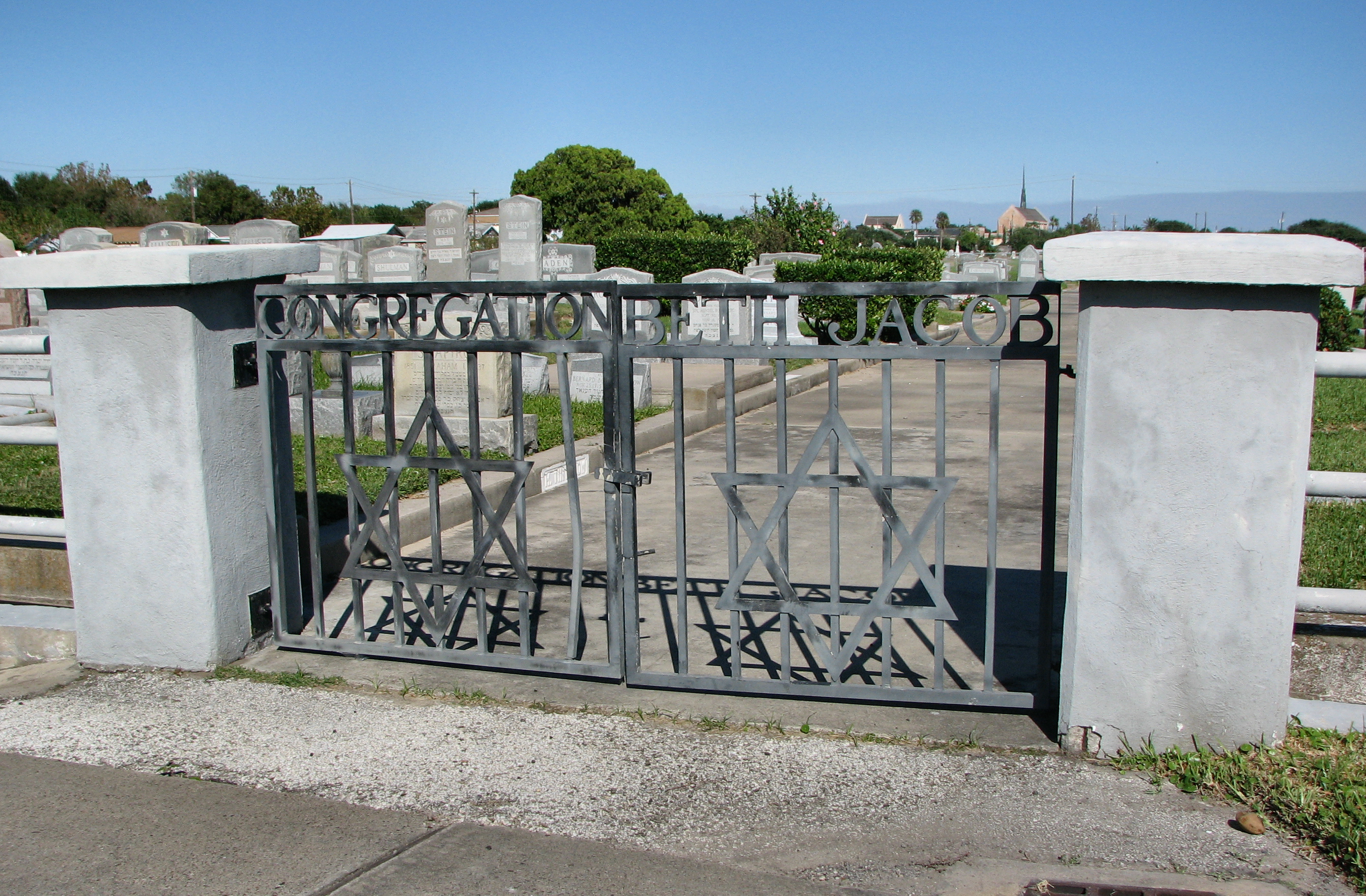
Beth Jacob Cemetery

Beth Jacob's roots date back to 1888 when a group of Orthodox Russian Jews came together to form the Hebrew Orthodox Benevolent Association. Around the same time a group of Orthodox Jews from the Austro-Hungarian Empire immigrated to Galveston and began looking for a synagogue to join. As the only Orthodox synagogue in Galveston at the time followed the Russian tradition, the group of Austro-Hungarian Jews chose to form their own synagogue organization, the Young Men's Hebrew Association.

During the early part of the 20th century there was a great influx of Jews from Russia and eastern Europe under the Galveston Movement program. Therefore, in an effort to unite the growing Orthodox community, on February 15, 1931, the two Orthodox congregations voted to merge and form Congregation Beth Jacob. Despite being in the middle of the Great Depression, Rabbi Louis Feigon and members raised funds to build a new synagogue on the site of the old Hebrew Orthodox Benevolent Association.

The congregation continued to grow and by the early 1960s it became evident new buildings were needed for religious, educational and social facilities. In 1965 a new wing was built that included a 242-seat sanctuary, a large social hall, a library and more school rooms for the expanded Sunday, Hebrew and Hebrew high schools.

In the 1970s the congregation joined the United Synagogue of Conservative Judaism.

== See also ==
- Galveston Movement
- Jewish Texan
- History of the Jews in Galveston, Texas

== Bibliography ==
- Beasley, Ellen; Fox, Stephen (1996). Galveston Architectural Guidebook. Houston: Rice University Press. ISBN 0-89263-345-X.
