= Abraham Cohen Labatt =

American pioneer of Reform Judaism

Abraham Cohen Labatt (1802, Charleston, South Carolina - August 16, 1899, Galveston, Texas) was an American Sephardic Jew who was a prominent pioneer of Reform Judaism in the United States in the 19th century, founding several early congregations in the South and in San Francisco after the Gold Rush. A merchant, in the 1830s he helped pioneer trade between United States interests in Charleston and those in Texas and Mexico.

== Early life and education ==
Abraham Labatt was a Sephardic Jew born in Charleston, South Carolina. His parents were David C. Labatt and Catherine Cohen (1773-1846), who came to Charleston by the time of the 1800 census having emigrated from Spain and Portugal, via Germany, France, the Netherlands and England.

== Career ==
As a young man, Labatt was one of the founders and first settlers of Cheraw, South Carolina, where he joined a Masonic Lodge in 1823.

In 1825, Labatt helped organize the Reform congregation in Charleston, the first in the United States.

A few years later, he moved with his young family to Charlotte, North Carolina, where he worked as a merchant and trader. He was appointed post master of a small town in what was then Mecklenburg County and is now believed to be Monroe, North Carolina by US President Andrew Jackson, which he named Jacksonville (not to be confused with Jacksonville, North Carolina). In 1827 he purchased large plots of land there and in 1830 and 1832 he was granted powers of attorney by his father-in-law Samuel Hyams to sell more land in Mecklenburg and two slaves named Sandy and Gabriel that Hyams owned. On 3 November 1829 he placed an advertisement in the Western Carolinian for a "House of Accommodation", believed to be same place as Labatt's Crossroads, where Union County's first court sat.

In 1831 he moved to New Orleans, where he engaged in mercantile pursuits. In that city, he was one of the founders of the first Jewish congregations in Louisiana, which became known as the Portuguese Jewish Nefutzot Yehudah congregation (or Portuguese Synagogue). (In 1870, its rabbi visited Galveston to dedicate the cornerstone of the first synagogue of Congregation B'nai Israel.) Labatt was also a firefighter and was the secretary and a founder of the Firemen's Charitable Association of New Orleans, which was established in 1832.

In 1831, Labatt visited Velasco, Texas, then part of Mexico, which had achieved independence in 1821, to explore opportunities for international trade. A settlement had just been started based on a trading post. He visited again in 1837 as supercargo of the steamship Columbia. This was the first cargo ship to trade between the U.S., via Charleston, and Texas (by then an independent republic) and Mexico.

Following the Gold Rush of 1849, Labatt went to California (arriving in the August 1849) as a merchant, along with hundreds of thousands of other migrants. He also served as the first president of Congregation Emanu-El (San Francisco) in April 1851. One of the founders of the San Francisco synagogue Shearith Israel, he laid its foundation-stone in 1856.

Labatt became the Worshipful Master or Postmaster General of the Davy Crockett Lodge, the West's first Masonic Lodge, named after an American pioneer of the Southeast, a name which he helped choose. He had been a friend of Crockett's, as well as Texas president Sam Houston. Active politically, Labatt was elected as an alderman of San Francisco.

== Marriage and family ==
Labatt's granddaughter Cora was the Queen of Mardi Gras in New Orleans in the Rex parade in 1877.

In Charleston, South Carolina, Labatt married Caroline Hyams (born 1802), a sister of Louisiana Lieutenant-Governor Henry M. Hyams and Samuel M. Hyams, Jr. (Asst. Adjutant General & Lieut. Colonel, 3rd Infantry Regt., LA, Confederate Army). They had sixteen children together.

One of his grandsons, Leon L. Labatt (1854-1928), was a Louisiana judge and chess player who won the Louisiana Chess Championship in 1917, and in his lifetime played against fellow Louisianans Paul Morphy and Armand Blackmar, as well as worldwide greats Emanuel Lasker, Carlos Torre Repetto, Wilhelm Steinitz, Johannes Zukertort, Adolf Albin and José Raúl Capablanca.

Another of his sons, Henry Jacob Labatt (1832-1900), became an influential attorney in San Francisco, where he was editor of the Voice of Israel, the first Jewish newspaper in the US West in 1856, along with Rabbi Herman Bien. He had moved to Galveston, Texas by 1869, when he was elected to the Galveston Board of Aldermen and served as the City Treasurer. He was a member of the Texas House of Representatives 1881-1883, became president of the Zacharias Frankel B’nai B’rith Lodge #242 and had a small town named after him called Labatt, Texas, situated in western Wilson County on the San Antonio and Aransas Pass Railway, which was abandoned in the 1930s. He, his wife Eleanor, their children Ellie and Joseph, and Joseph's wife and four children, all died in the 1900 Galveston hurricane.

Other Labatt children include David Cohen Labatt (Captain & Quartermaster, 5th Infantry Regt., LA, Confederate Army; Judge), Samuel Kosciusko Labatt (Commander, Ringgold Lite Artillery, California Militia, 1853-1855), Theodore, Eliza E. Labatt (never married), Louise C. Labatt (never married), Jackson E. Labatt (Private, Co. G, 26th Infantry Regt., LA, Confederate Army), Joseph Isaac Labatt and Miriam Hyams Labatt Smith (Mrs.John B., Brigadier General; Louisiana Confederate Widow's Pension).

== Return to the Gulf Coast ==
In the 1859-1860, some of the Labatt family returned to Louisiana. Labatt was a sutler in Col. Hunt's 2nd Louisiana Infantry Volunteers and was captured bu the uNion Army in May 1862 and was paroled on February 27, 1863. The elder Labatts and daughters moved to Waco, Texas by 1872. After his wife died in the fall of 1878, Labatt and his daughters moved to Galveston and lived with his son, Henry J. Labatt, until his death in 1899. Labatt joined the Congregation B'nai Israel, which was also Reform. He continued to be active in temple activities.

== Death ==
Labatt died of old age and gastritis at his son Henry's house in Galveston on August 16, 1899, aged 97 or 98. He was the second oldest Mason in the United States at the time of death.

== See also ==
- History of the Jews in Galveston, Texas
- History of the Jews in Charleston, South Carolina
