= Samuel M. Stahl =

Rabbi Samuel M. Stahl (born August 25, 1939) is rabbi emeritus of Temple Beth-El (San Antonio, Texas) since 2002. Rabbi Stahl served the San Antonio, Texas Temple Beth-El for 26 years as its "Senior Rabbi." Previously, Rabbi Stahl served as a chaplain in the United States Army and as rabbi of Congregation B'nai Israel of Galveston, Texas.

== Publications ==
In 1993, Rabbi Stahl wrote, Making the Timeless Timely: Thoughts and reflections of a contemporary reform rabbi and "Boundaries, Not Barriers: Some Uniquely Jewish Perspectives on Life."
