= Henry Cohen (rabbi) =

British-American rabbi, scholar, community activist and writer

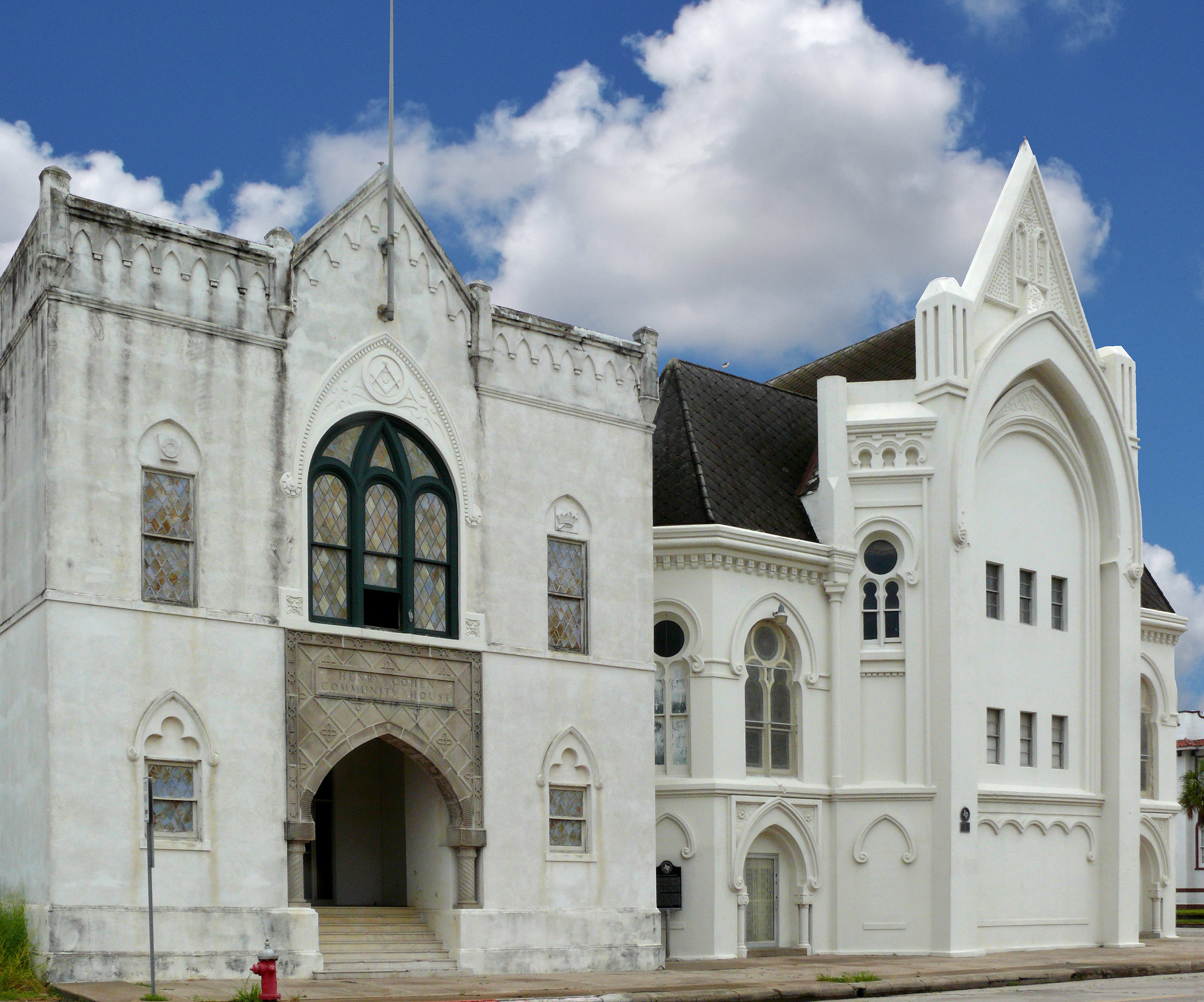
Henry Cohen Community House on Left. First B'nai Israel Temple on Right

Henry Cohen (April 7, 1863 – June 12, 1952) was a British-American rabbi, scholar, community activist and writer who served most of his career at Congregation B'nai Israel in Galveston, Texas, from 1888 to 1949. He came to the United States in 1885, during a period of rapid and massive growth related to early 20th-century immigration from eastern and southern Europe. In Texas, he organized the Galveston Movement, which worked from 1907 to 1914 to attract eastern European Jewish immigrants to Galveston and the Gulf Coast as a destination, as an alternative to the better known Northeastern cities. Ten thousand such immigrants entered at Galveston.

When his congregation built a community house in 1928, they named it in his honor. He helped organize and lead many educational and community institutions. Able to read ten languages, he was known as a Talmud scholar, and published books about Texas history and Judaism. Together with rabbi David Lefkowitz of Dallas, Cohen interviewed many Jewish Texans to collect their histories for the Texas Centennial in 1936.

== Early life, education and career ==
Henry Cohen was born in 1863 to David and Josephine C. Cohen, a Jewish family in London, England. He was a brother of Maurice Abraham Cohen. He was educated in local schools, worked with the Board of Guardians, a Jewish relief agency, and studied at Jews' College. Before graduating, in 1880 he traveled to Cape Town Colony, South Africa, where he worked as an interpreter for the British government. In 1883 he returned to England, completing his studies and being ordained a rabbi in 1884.

He migrated to Kingston, Jamaica for his first assignment, where there was a sizable Sephardic Jewish community. It dated from the colonial period.

In 1885 Cohen was called by the Jewish community of Woodville, Mississippi and immigrated to the United States. He also taught at a female seminary in the town. In 1888 he moved to the larger city of Galveston, Texas, where he later became naturalized as a United States citizen.

== History in Galveston ==
Henry Cohen became the rabbi of Congregation B'nai Israel in Galveston, Texas in 1888, when he was 25. He served with that congregation until 1949, for most of his life.

In 1889 he married Mollie Levy, and they had two children. One of their grandsons, Henry Cohen II, also became a rabbi.

The early twentieth century was a period of rapid growth in Galveston, as the port city was developed for shipping and entertainment. It had waves of immigration of Jews and Catholics from eastern and southern Europe. Cohen worked to ease relations between German Jews in Texas, who had joined the Reform movement and become quite established, and the new Jewish immigrants from eastern Europe, who were generally Orthodox, Yiddish-speaking, and generally from small shtetls with different cultures.

Cohen and his congregation helped Galveston to rebuild after the devastating damage and thousands of deaths from the Hurricane of 1900. They were committed to staying in the city.

With others, Cohen organized the Galveston Movement, leading it from 1907-1914. The Jewish Immigrant Information Bureau worked to attract Jews emigrating from the Russian Empire and eastern Europe to Galveston and the Gulf Coast; many had been entering the already crowded East Coast cities, such as New York City, Philadelphia, and Boston, which were better known as destinations. Cohen and other Texas Jewish leaders wanted not only to strengthen Jewish communities in Texas and the center of the country, but to lessen potential conflicts arising from heavy immigration to the Northeast and to prevent restrictions on immigration being passed by Congress.

He and others worked to resettle Jews in the middle of the country, from the Mississippi River west to the Rocky Mountains.

Ten thousand Jewish immigrants passed through Galveston during this era, approximately one-third the number who migrated to Palestine during the same period. Members of Cohen's congregation would meet Jewish immigrants arriving at the port, and help them find places to stay and work, as well as introduce them to their new society and help them adjust to the United States. The movement was often internally divided, and many European Jews were intent on reaching known industrial cities.

Cohen personally petitioned President William Howard Taft on behalf of one immigrant to enable him to stay in the country. Cohen is known for having saved a Greek Catholic from being deported from Texas. He also worked to persuade the Galveston School Board to ban William Shakespeare's The Merchant of Venice from the Galveston public schools, as he felt the character of Shylock was portrayed in an anti-Semitic way.

Cohen served all the people, working to have the age of sexual consent raised from ten to eighteen for girls. He served on the state prison board for three decades, and achieved reforms: introducing vocational training, parole reforms, and separation of first offenders from seasoned criminals.

The rabbi was instrumental in organizing and leading community institutions: he was a member of the "advisory board of Hebrew Union College and the Jewish Publication Society, president of the Texas Historical Society of Galveston, advisory chairman of the Lasker Home for Homeless Children, president of Seamen's Bethel, member of the Executive Council of the Central Conference of American Rabbis, founder and president of the Galveston Open Forum, deputy member of the Council of the Jewish Agency, twenty-year director of the Galveston Community Chest, and one of seven charter members of the Galveston Equal Suffrage Association."

Cohen retired in September 1949 but served his congregation as rabbi emeritus until his death. He died on June 12, 1952.

== Historian of Texas Jewry ==
The Handbook of Texas states that,

The formal preservation of the history of Texas Jewry goes back to Rabbi Henry Cohen of Galveston and David Lefkowitz of Dallas, who set out to interview as many early settlers and their families as possible. They produced a historical account for the Texas Centennial in 1936.

== Written works ==
- In the 1890s Cohen contributed articles for the Texas Journal of Education, along with translations and poems.

Books included the following:

- Talmudic Sayings (1894)
- Monographs included:

- Settlement of the Jews in Texas (1894), - Henry Castro, Pioneer and Colonist (1896), - The Galveston Immigration Movement, 1907–1910 (1910)

- with David Lefkowitz, he coauthored One Hundred Years of Jewry in Texas (1936?)

== Legacy and honors ==
- In 1928 Congregation B'nai Israel named its new center as the Henry Cohen Community House in his honor.
- His papers and library are housed at the Barker Texas History Center, University of Texas at Austin.
- A state historical marker in Galveston commemorates the synagogue and Henry Cohen.

== See also ==
- History of the Jews in Galveston, Texas
