= Port of Galveston immigration =

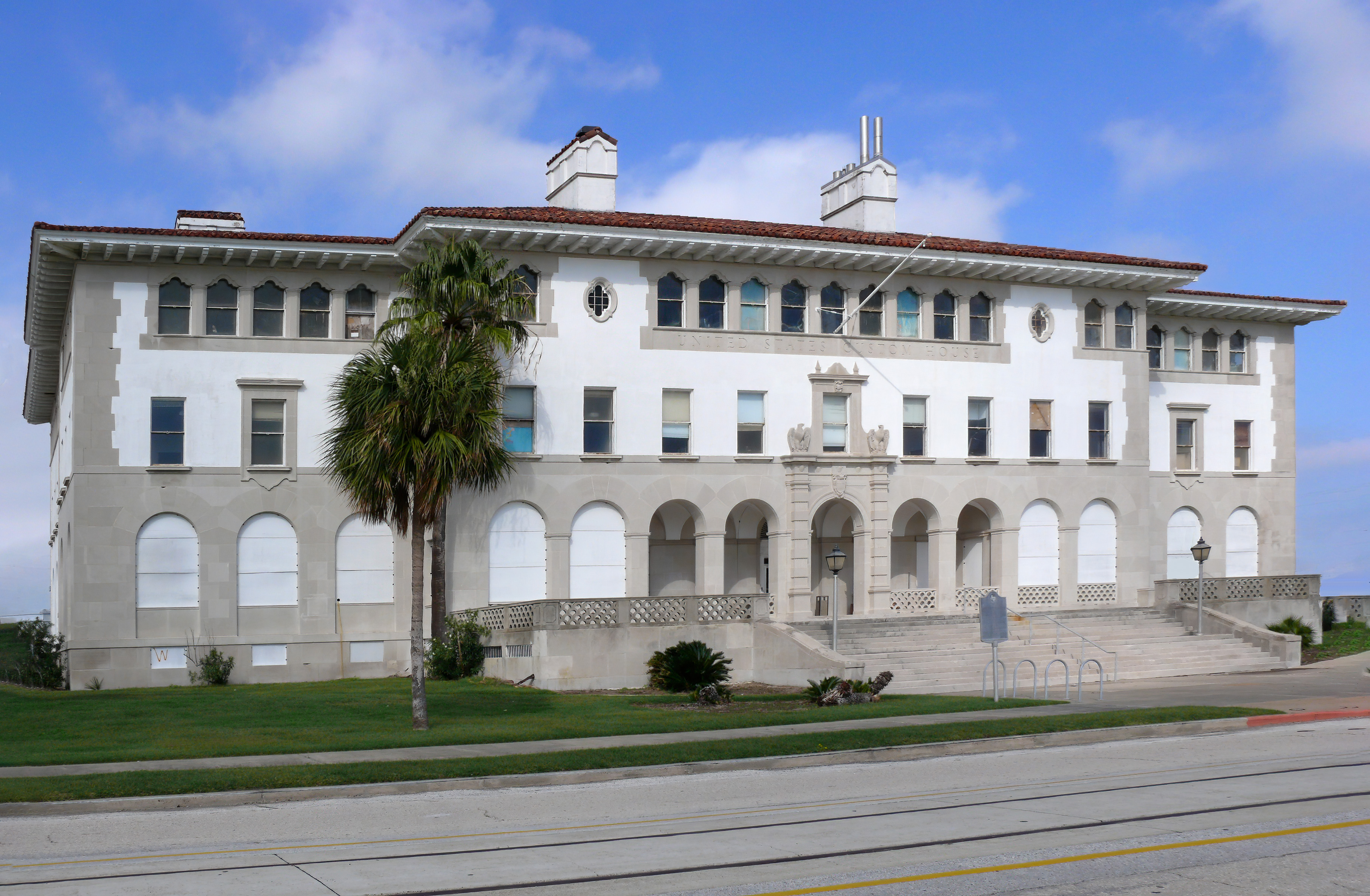
Galveston Immigration Stations

The immigrant inspection station at the Port of Galveston, in Galveston, Texas, was the gateway for tens of thousands of immigrants to the Southwest of the United States. Galveston was one of the largest cities in Texas until the hurricane of 1900 devastated the city

The Galveston station opened in 1906. Although not as familiar as Ellis Island, Galveston is known for an influx of Jewish immigrants from Europe during this period, the Galveston Movement. Immigrants from all over the world entered the United States through Galveston, including Central and South America, Asia, and Europe.

The station in Galveston was built on Pelican Island. “When the federal government replaced state administrations in processing immigrants at the turn of the century, efforts began to redirect the flow of immigration from the Northeast to Texas. Pelican Island became federal property, and the government constructed an immigration center and quarantine station there." Quarantine centers already existed at other stations as well, because of the idea that immigrants brought with them diseases that could spread to the American people. After an outbreak of yellow fever, the quarantine station on Pelican Island was set up to ensure the disease did not reach the US population. The quarantine center was based on the one at Ellis Island, but was not as large or efficient.

Although known as “The Ellis Island of the West”, Galveston processed fewer immigrants than Ellis Island, but was at one time one of the largest immigration stations in the west. "Between 1906 and 1914 nearly 50,000 immigrants arrived at Galveston, including Bohemians, Moravians, Galicians, Australians, Romanians, Swiss, English, Poles Italians, Dutch, and some 10,000 Jews."

Many were Jewish. Eventually, “between 1907 and 1914, approximately ten thousand Jews entered the United States through the port of Galveston, Texas.” There was a push for Jewish immigrants to enter the United States through Galveston rather than Ellis Island because “the vast majority of Jewish immigrants remained in the ghettos of New York“. A project of the Jewish Immigrants' Information Bureau, the London-based Jewish Territorial Organization, and Jewish philanthropists such as Jacob Schiff to stop the concentration of Jewish immigrants in the congested industrial cities of the northeastern United States landed them in Texas instead, and helped them to find jobs in the west.

The Jewish population had concerns that anti-Semitism had led to rejections of Jewish immigrants at ports of entry, but Galveston immigration officials were no exception.

The immigration station was damaged by storms in 1915 and 1916. It was then moved to 21st Street. World War I greatly reduced the number of immigrants entering through the Port of Galveston. The center was eventually demolished in 1972. However, the impact of the Jewish immigrant population in the Southwest, was due in large part to the Galveston station.

== See also ==
- Galveston Movement
