= Galveston County Courthouse =

Coordinates: 29.30347°N 94.78968°W

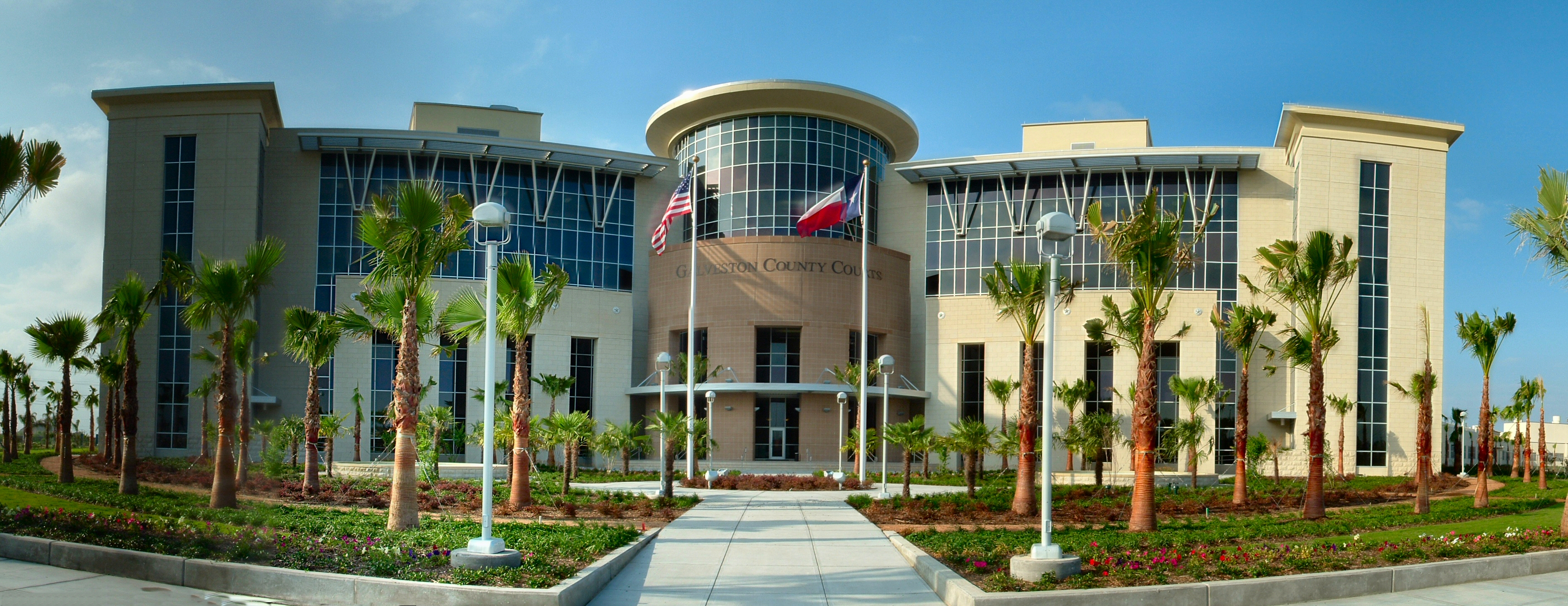
Galveston County Justice Center, the current courthouse

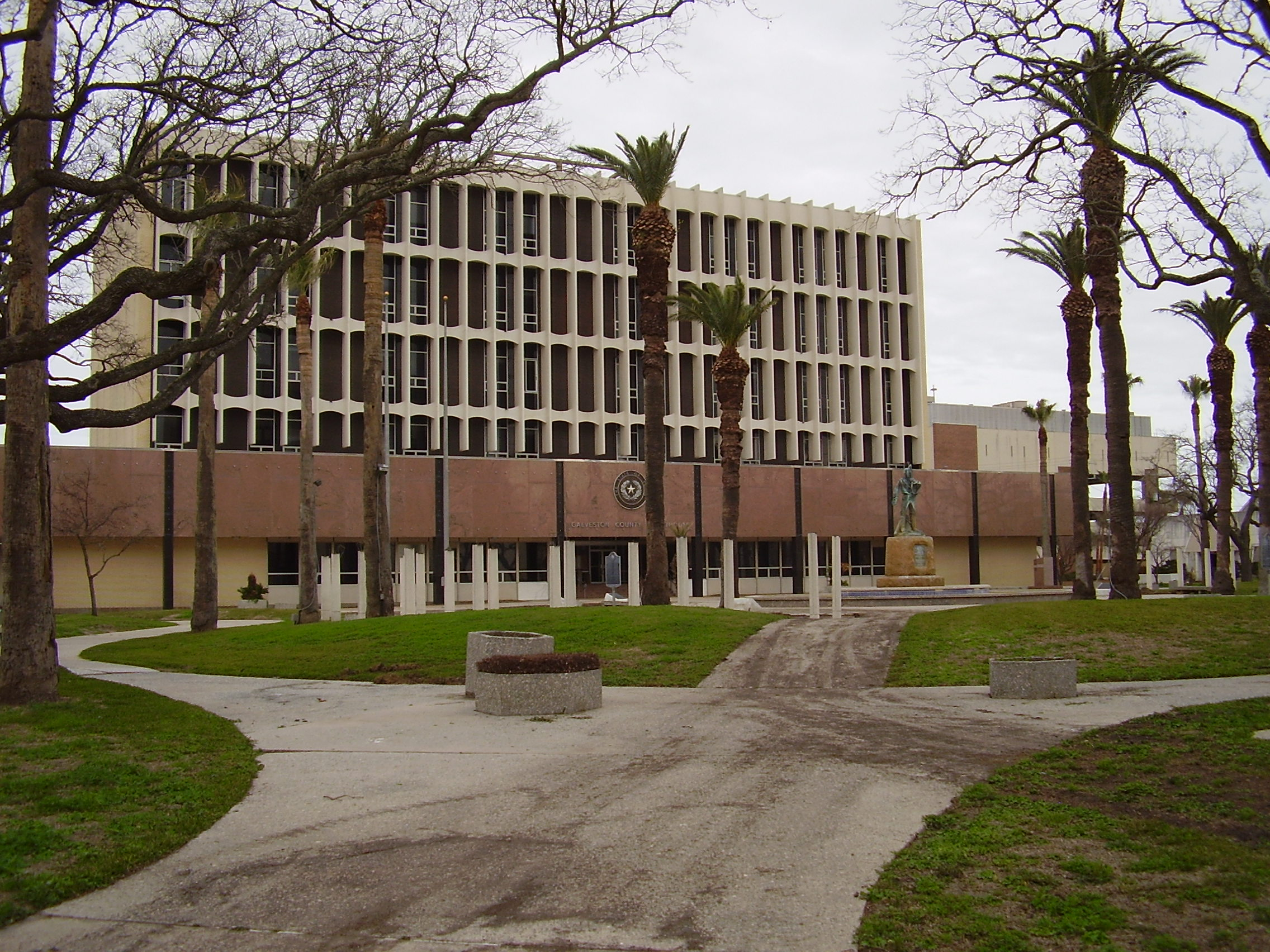
1966 Galveston County Courthouse

The Galveston County Courthouse is the county government's courthouse building in Galveston County, Texas. Several buildings have been constructed for and used as the courthouse over the years.

== History ==
Galveston County was established in 1838. A courthouse building was erected in 1898. Another was built in 1966. Tibor Beerman was the primary architect. The current courthouse building is known as the Galveston County Justice Center and was dedicated in 2006.

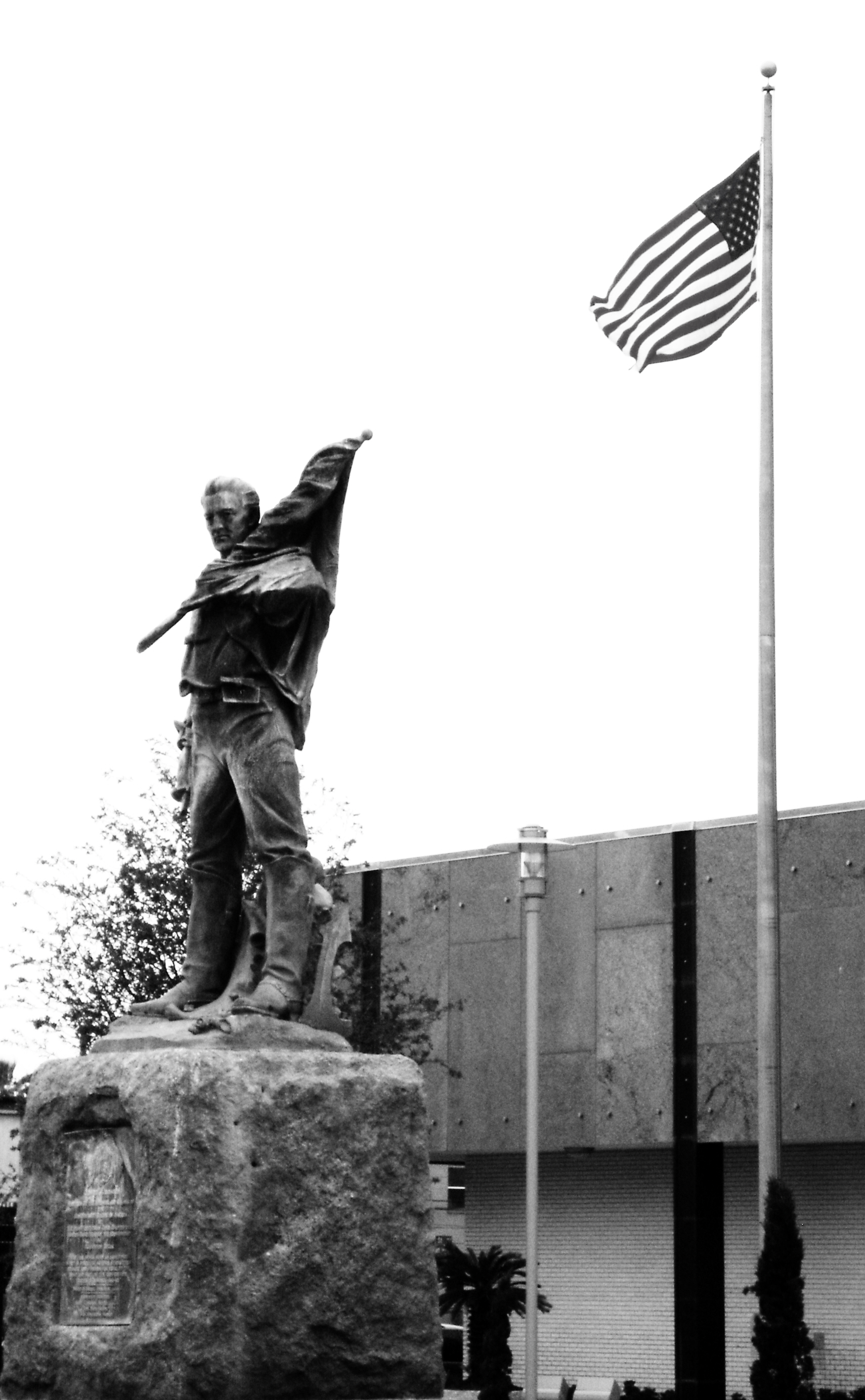
Dignified Resignation statue erected at the courthouse in 1911
