= Maurice Abraham Cohen =

- Born: 1851; London, England
- Died: 26 June 1923 (aged 72)
- Occupations: Educator; Linguist

Maurice (Moses) Abraham Cohen (1851 – 26 June 1923) was a linguist and pioneer of Jewish education in Sydney, Australia.

Cohen was born in London, England in 1851.

1883, Cohen married Deborah Grouse at the Central Synagogue in London.

- Cohen and his wife Deborah (née Grouse) had six sons: Lionel, Harry, Bert, Sydney, Bernard David (known as David), and Arthur.

== Career ==
After completing his education, Cohen worked as a teacher before travelling to India. Here he was headmaster at the Sassoon school in Bombay while taking a degree at the Bombay University. He then served as the personal translator for General Roberts, commander of British Forces in Afghanistan during the Second Anglo-Afghan War. In 1887, after home leave in England, he travelled to Australia where he took up a role as the first headmaster of the Jewish Sunday School that had recently been established in Sydney. He went on to be appointed head of the NSW Jewish Board of Education.

Cohen was regarded as a world expert on the language of Urdu during his lifetime. He was one time editor of Sydney's first Jewish weekly newspaper as well as a lecturer on Hebrew at a number of theological colleges in Australia. Maurice Abraham Cohen was fluent and also taught Yiddish, Ladino, Spanish, German, Aramaic, Amharic and Arabic.

== Social commentator ==
Cohen was one of the first European Australians to call attention to the plight of the Australian Aborigines and argue for compensation and land rights, even risking his position as editor of the Australian Hebrew with his fiery opinion pieces on the subject. He also argued for increased non-discriminatory immigration drawing from all cultures and vehemently opposed the White Australia Policy.
