= Rosanna Osterman =

Roseanna Osterman
- Born: Roseanna Dyer; February 26, 1809
- Died: February 2, 1866 (aged 56); Mississippi River near Vicksburg, Mississippi
- Occupations: Businesswoman, nurse
- Years active: 1838-1866
- Known for: Establishing first Jewish cemetery in Galveston; aiding the sick.

Rosanna Osterman (née Dyer, February 26, 1809 - February 2, 1866) was a Civil War nurse, philanthropist and pioneer of Galveston, Texas. Overall, she distributed approximately $75,000 to different charitable causes.

== Early life ==
Osterman was born in Germany and moved with her family to Baltimore, Maryland when she was young. On February 23, 1825, she married Joseph Osterman. Her brother, Major Leon Dyer, was among the soldiers who escorted the captured Santa Ana in late 1836.

== Move to Galveston ==
Leon Dyer, Osterman's older brother, encouraged Osterman's husband to set up a business in Galveston in 1837. One year later, Osterman followed him. She and her husband turned a small business run out of a tent into a large general store and an import-export business. They were among about 30 Jewish residents in Galveston at the time. The business was a great success and Joseph Osterman retired by 1842, selling the business to Osterman's brother, Isadore Dyer. The Ostermans built the first two story residence in Galveston, which later in 1921, became the headquarters of the YWCA. Osterman shared her recipe for dried meat biscuits with local businessman Gail Borden, a friend of the family. Borden's experiments to "perfect the biscuit" were financed by Joseph Osterman.

== Jewish cemetery ==
During her first year in Galveston, the first Jew died and was buried in a non-Jewish cemetery. This led to Osterman to campaign for the creation of the first Jewish cemetery in Texas, which was built in 1852, and for her bringing in the first Jewish clergyman in Texas, Rabbi M.N. Nathan to consecrate it.

== Hospital ==
During the yellow fever outbreaks in 1853, she brought victims of the disease to her land where she set up a temporary hospital. She nursed patients as a volunteer and assisted in epidemics that took place between 1854 and 1866.

== Civil War ==
Later, in 1862, Galveston was taken over by Union soldiers in the Civil War. When Galvaston was blockaded, she remained in the city and turned her home into a hospital. Osterman may have received intelligence from a Union soldier she was nursing in her infirmary which caused the Southern army to launch the Second Battle of Galveston early. She had been a courier for military information, bringing intelligence to Confederates in Houston.

== Death ==
In 1862, her husband died from an accidental "pistol shot." Osterman drowned after a steamboat explosion on the Mississippi River near Vicksburg at the age of 57, in 1866. The boat was the W.R. Carter, and her body was recovered after the accident. She was buried in the Dispersed of Judah Cemetery in New Orleans.

== Philanthropy after death ==
Osterman had a large estate in which much of the money went to charity. One of the provisions of her will included the creation of an orphan and widow's home. She also made contributions to the Galveston Sailor's Home and the Howard Association in Galveston. Other provisions sent money to Jewish hospitals around the country and money to build synagogues in Galveston and Houston.
