= Galveston Movement =

U.S. Jewish immigration aid program

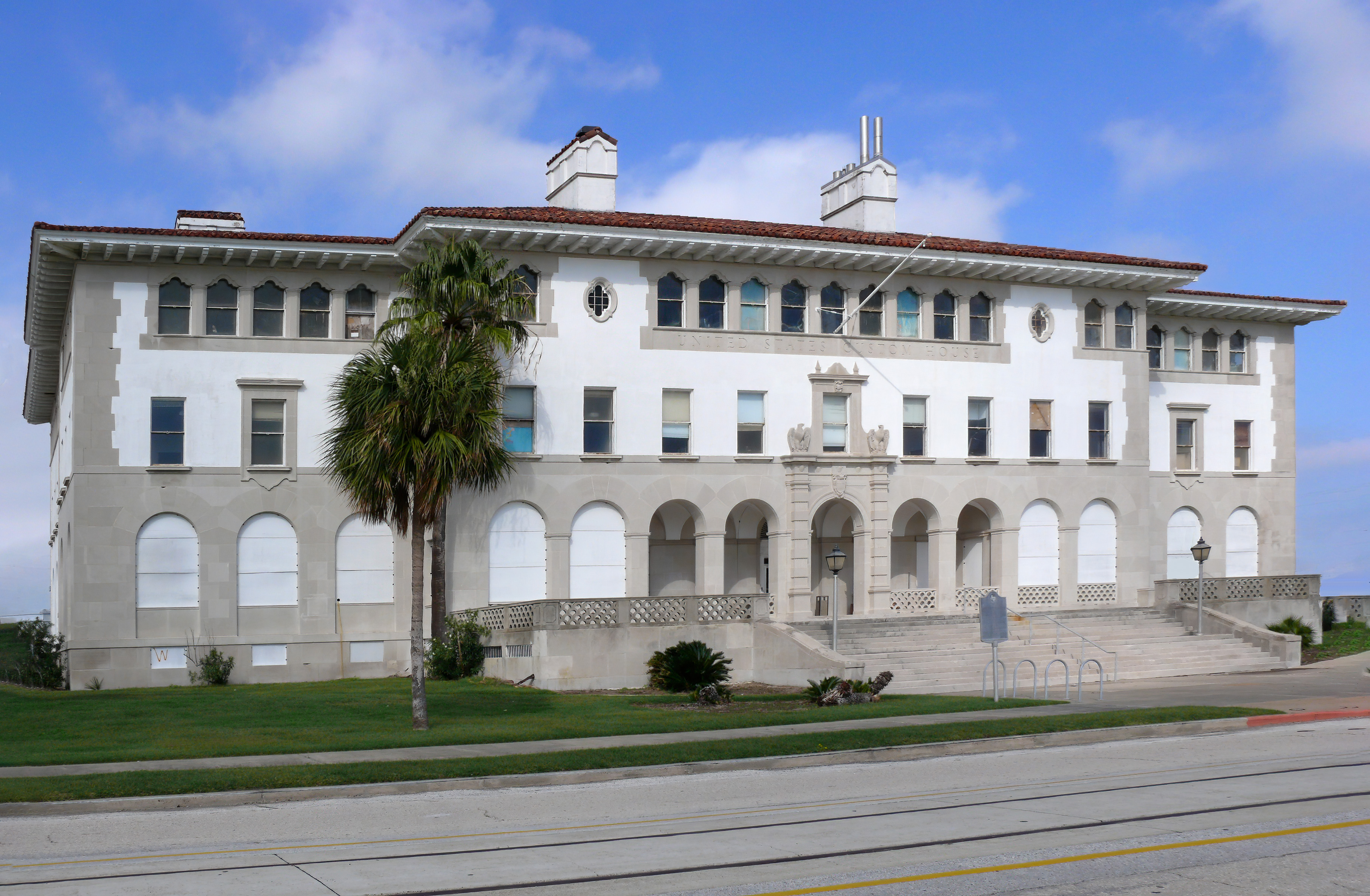
Galveston Immigration Stations

The Galveston Movement, also known as the Galveston Plan, was a U.S. immigration assistance program operated by several Jewish organizations between 1907 and 1914. The program diverted Jewish immigrants, fleeing Russia and eastern Europe, away from East Coast cities, particularly New York. During its operation, ten thousand Jewish immigrants passed through the port of Galveston, Texas, about a third the number that immigrated to Ottoman Palestine during the same period. New York financier and philanthropist Jacob Schiff was the driving force behind the effort, which he supported with nearly $500,000 ($16.9 million in 2024 dollars) of his personal fortune. B'nai Israel's Rabbi Henry Cohen was the humanitarian face of the movement, meeting ships at the Galveston docks and helping guide the immigrants through the cumbersome arrival and distribution process, and on into the countryside.

== Background and origin ==
Increased antisemitic pogroms in Czarist Russia, starting in the early 1880s, led to a tidal wave of Jewish immigration to the United States. The established Jewish elite in America had long sought to increase US government diplomatic involvement to help alleviate similar occurrences for their co-religionists in Europe, and strongly supported continued open immigration generally, as a way to accomplish this. Four times between 1896 and 1906 they registered their objections to immigration restrictions when these were debated in Congress, but crowded conditions and rampant poverty in these neighborhoods were well documented. The Jewish Immigrant Information Bureau, based in Galveston, directed the movement as a means of preventing an anticipated wave of anti-Semitism on the Eastern seaboard, which might lead to immigration restrictions. It therefore sought to find suitable alternative destinations for the influx of immigrants.

Among the cities considered were Charleston (South Carolina), New Orleans, and Galveston (Texas). Charleston, despite its long-established Jewish community, explicitly wanted Anglo-Saxon immigrants, and New Orleans, a thriving urban center where Jews might be inclined to settle instead of moving on into the interior, was also threatened by outbreaks of yellow fever.

Galveston was judged as best; its small size would not encourage large numbers of Jews to settle there permanently and it provided convenience and closer access to the growing economic opportunities in Texas, the American Midwest, and the American West. In spite of the devastating 1900 hurricane it was still one of the nation's leading ports, and it was already a destination of the German shipping company Norddeutscher Lloyd, which operated out of Bremen, the major point of European embarkation.

== Years and number of immigrants ==
Beginning in 1909 substantial numbers of immigrants began to arrive in Galveston. In 1909 there were 773 arrivals; in 1910 there were 2500; and in 1911 there were 1,400. Though this was only a small percentage of total Jewish immigration to the U.S., it was nevertheless significant given Texas' relatively sparse population at the time (Galveston itself had around 37,000 people). Soon resentment grew in the local communities due to fears among merchants about competition and the refusal of many Jewish workers to abide by the restrictions placed upon them by their employers (including many refusing to work on Saturdays). Increasingly, communities rejected further Jewish immigrants so that immigration largely stopped after 1914. Still, throughout many of the small towns in Texas the courthouse square features stores founded in the early twentieth century by these immigrants who settled and became merchants.

== See also ==
- Congregation B'nai Israel (Galveston, Texas)
- Galveston, Texas
- History of the Jews in Galveston, Texas
- History of the Jews in Texas
- Jewish Colonisation Association
- Jewish Territorial Organization
- Port of Galveston
- Proposals for a Jewish state
