= Congregation B'nai Israel (Galveston, Texas) =

Reform synagogue in Texas, US

B'nai Israel Temple
- Hebrew: בני ישראל
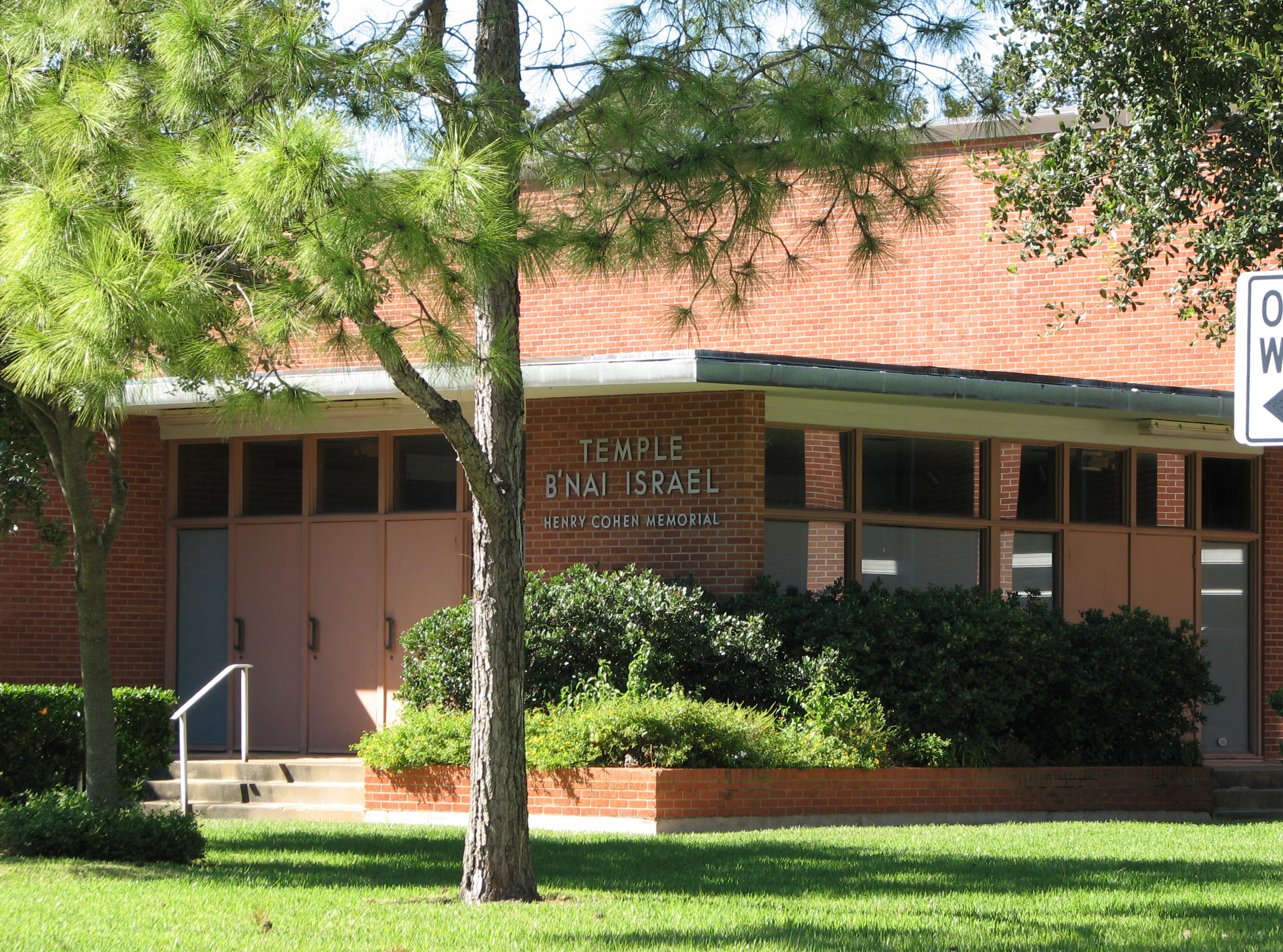
- Current B'nai Israel Temple

- Location in Texas

Religion
- Affiliation: Reform Judaism
- Ecclesiastical or organisational status: Synagogue
- Leadership: Rabbi Peter Kessler
- Status: Active

Location
- Location: 3008 Avenue O, Galveston, Texas 77550
- Country: United States
- Coordinates: 29°17′32″N 94°47′55″W

Architecture
- Architects: Fred Stewart (1870); Nicholas J. Clayton (1890); Tibor Beerman (1957)
- Established: 1868 (as a congregation)
- Completed: 1870 (22nd Street #1); 1890 (22nd Street #2); 1957 (Avenue O)

Website
- cbigalveston.org

Congregation B'nai Israel (Hebrew: בני ישראל, lit. 'Sons of Israel') is a Reform Jewish congregation and synagogue located in Galveston, Texas, in the United States. Organized by German Jewish immigrants in 1868, it is the oldest Reform congregation and the second chartered Jewish congregation in the state.

By the Galveston Movement, from 1907 to 1914, it helped attract thousands of eastern European Jewish immigrants to the city, Gulf Coast, and the middle region of the United States.

The congregation worships in The Rabbi Henry Cohen Memorial Temple, located at 3008 Avenue O.

== History ==
German Jews were among the many immigrants to Galveston from the German principalities in the 1840s; through their benevolent society, they established the first Jewish cemetery in Texas here in 1852. They held the first organized Jewish services in the state in Galveston in 1856. These two endeavors culminated in their organizing Congregation B'nai Israel in 1868 and its chartering in 1870.

The congregation has the distinction of being the first Reform congregation chartered in Texas, as well as the second Jewish congregation founded in the state. On June 20, 1875, the congregation voted to become one of the charter members of the Union of American Hebrew Congregations (now known as the Union for Reform Judaism.) It organized a school in 1869 and, by 1877, included Hebrew as a requirement of its curriculum.

Abraham Cohen Labatt, one of the pioneers of Reform Judaism in the United States, moved to Galveston in 1878 and joined the congregation. He was an active member until his death in 1899.

Beginning in 1888, Rabbi Henry Cohen led the congregation for more than five decades, through periods of rapid immigration of Jews from eastern Europe and two world wars. In addition, he provided leadership and care to people of all religions in the aftermath of the Galveston Hurricane of 1900, which destroyed many homes on the island and killed 6,000 people. He rallied members of the congregation to care for others.

=== B'nai Israel and the Galveston Movement ===
Rabbi Cohen is also credited with founding the Galveston Movement, which operated between 1907 and 1914. He organized Galveston's Jewish Immigration Information Office. The city was a major port of entry for immigrants. The Movement wanted to attract Jews fleeing Russia and eastern Europe to the Gulf Coast and away from crowded East Coast cities; they wanted to attract more Jewish settlement to the middle of the United States. Members of the congregation met all of the ships that docked carrying Jewish immigrants at the Port of Galveston. They helped to direct many of the passengers to new homes in Texas and beyond, and aided them in finding housing and work, as well as adjusting to American life.

Through the combined efforts of Rabbi Cohen and others, historians estimate that more than ten thousand Jewish immigrants passed through Galveston, with many settling there, in Texas and the South.

== Temple buildings ==
By 1870, the congregation was ready to build a sanctuary and invited Mr. Tuck, the grand master of the Masonic Lodge of Texas, to lay the cornerstone. They had invited Rabbi Jacobs of the New Orleans Portuguese Jewish Nefutzot Yehudah Congregation (later part of Touro Synagogue) to officiate; historians believe this was the first occasion when an ordained rabbi led a religious meeting in Texas.

The congregation continued to grow and, by the late 1880s, found they needed a new synagogue. They replaced the old structure on site at 822 22nd Street. They commissioned Nicholas J. Clayton, who was a notable Texas architect of religious structures. His Gothic Revival design of 1890 produced an ornately detailed synagogue that became a landmark in the city. The congregation used this building until selling it in the 1950s to the Masonic Lodge and moving to another new synagogue. The Masons simplified parts of the facade, but the basic structure remains.

=== Henry Cohen Community House ===
As the congregation grew in the twentieth century, it needed space for its activities. It decided to build a center in 1928; the Henry Cohen Community House was named in honor of their Rabbi Henry Cohen. The community house was built on the lot next to the 1890s temple. The congregation occupied this complex until the 1950s, when it moved to a new synagogue outside of downtown; designed by Holocaust survivor Tibor Beerman.

The entry to the community house has a carved limestone portal and a gate, which both feature the "Magen David" as the primary iconographic element. After the Congregation built a new synagogue, it sold the Clayton temple and community house to the Masons. They adapted the buildings for use as their Masonic Temple.

== Clergy ==
Since its founding, the congregation has been served by thirteen rabbis:

- Alexander Rosenspitz (1868–70)
- Abraham Blum, MD (1871–85)
- Joseph Silverman (1885–88)
- Rabbi Henry Cohen (1888–1950; Rabbi Emeritus 1950–1952)
- Leo Stillpass (1950–55)
- Stanley Dreyfus (1956–65)
- Robert Blinder (1965–69)
- Samuel M. Stahl (1969–76)
- Jimmy Kessler (1976–81)
- Alan Greenbaum (1981–85)
- Martin Levy (1985–89)
- Jimmy Kessler (1989–2014; Rabbi Emeritus 2014-)
- Rabbi Marshal Klaven (2014–2018)
- Rabbi Matthew Cohen (2018–2022)
- Rabbi Peter Kessler (2022-)

In 1976, Jimmy Kessler was the first native Texan to assume the leadership of the congregation.

== Gallery ==
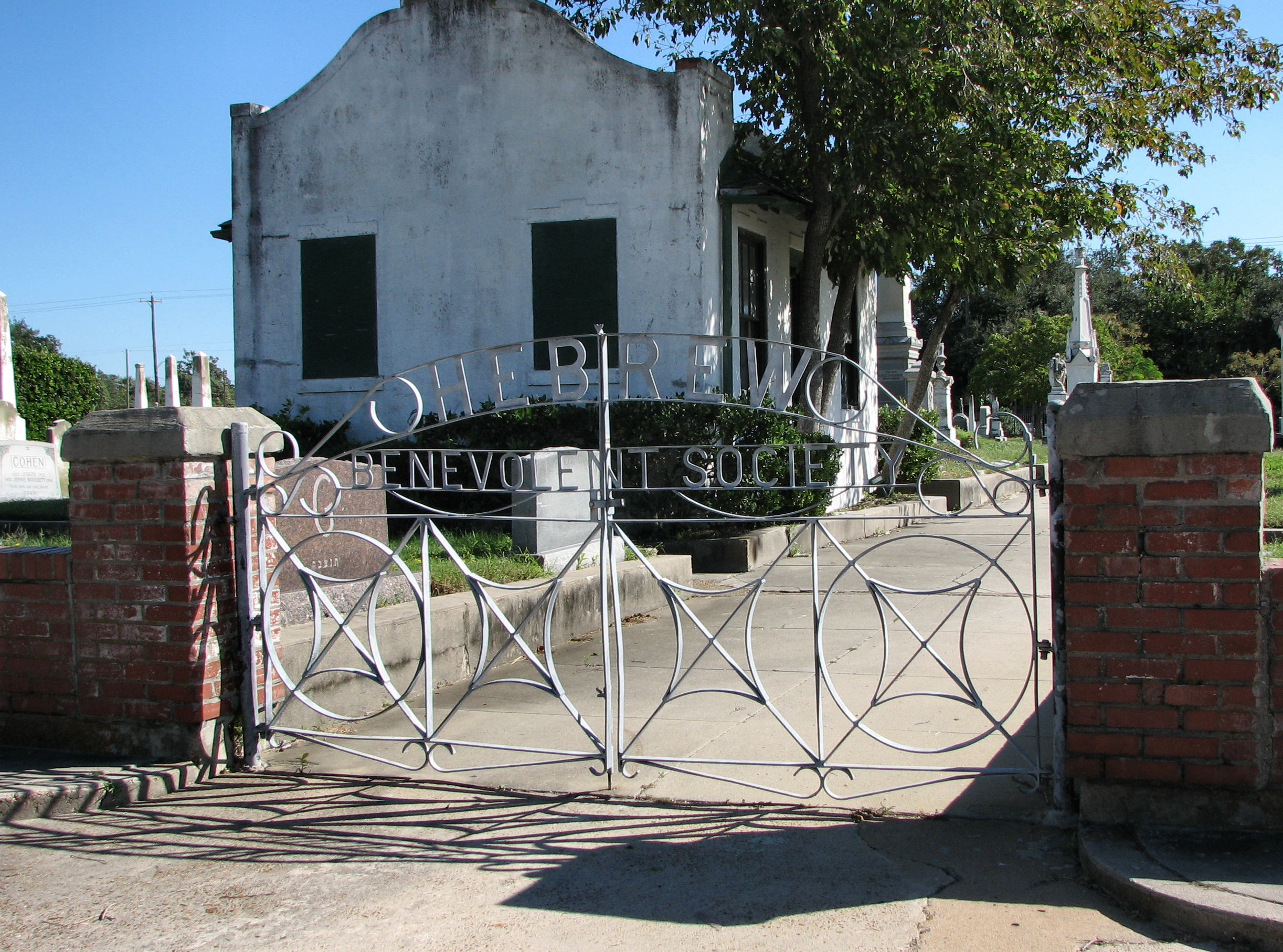
Hebrew Benevolent Cemetery, c. 1852

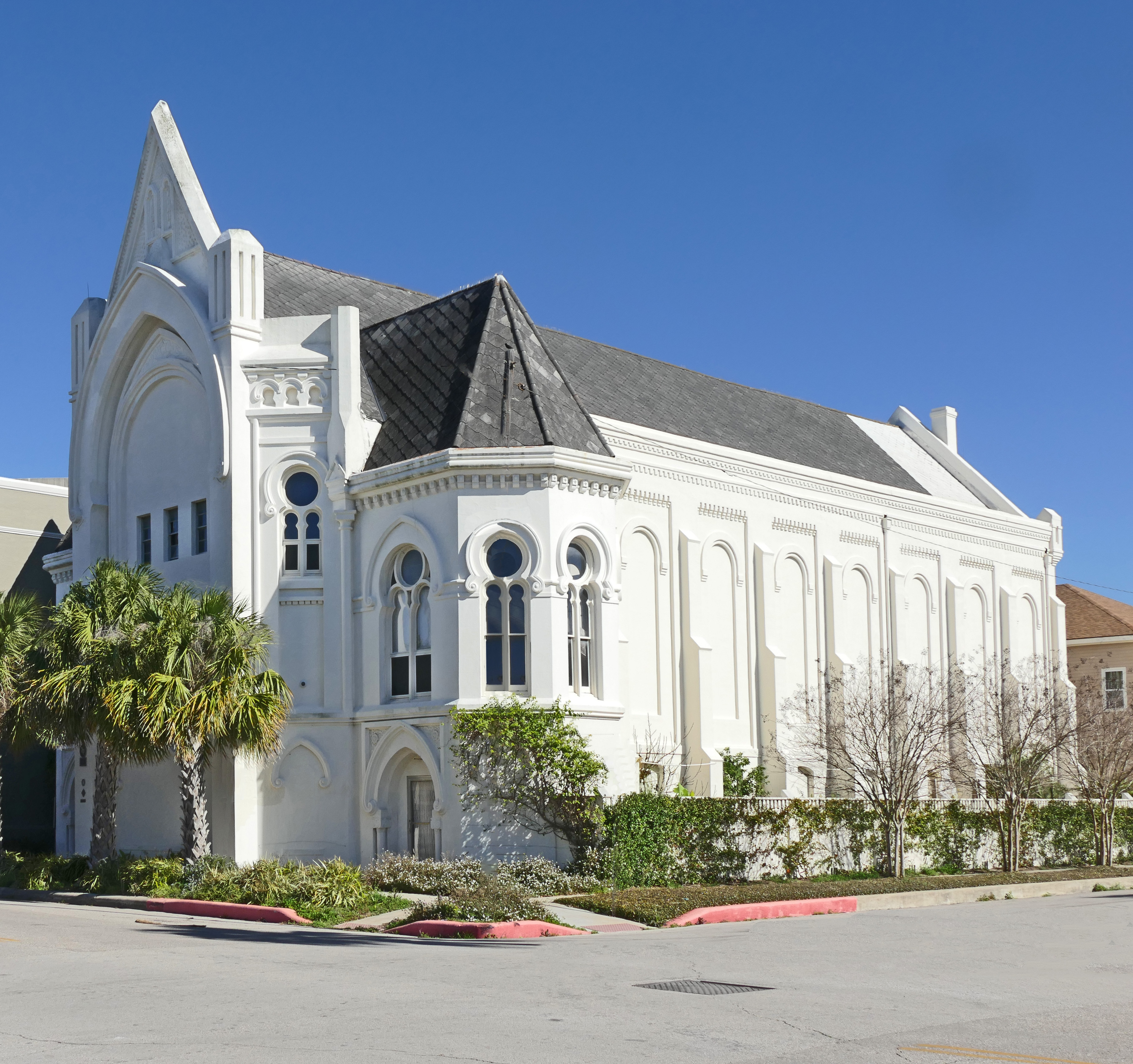
Former B'nai Israel Temple. The façade was made less ornate after the building was sold in the mid-1950s and adapted as a Masonic lodge.

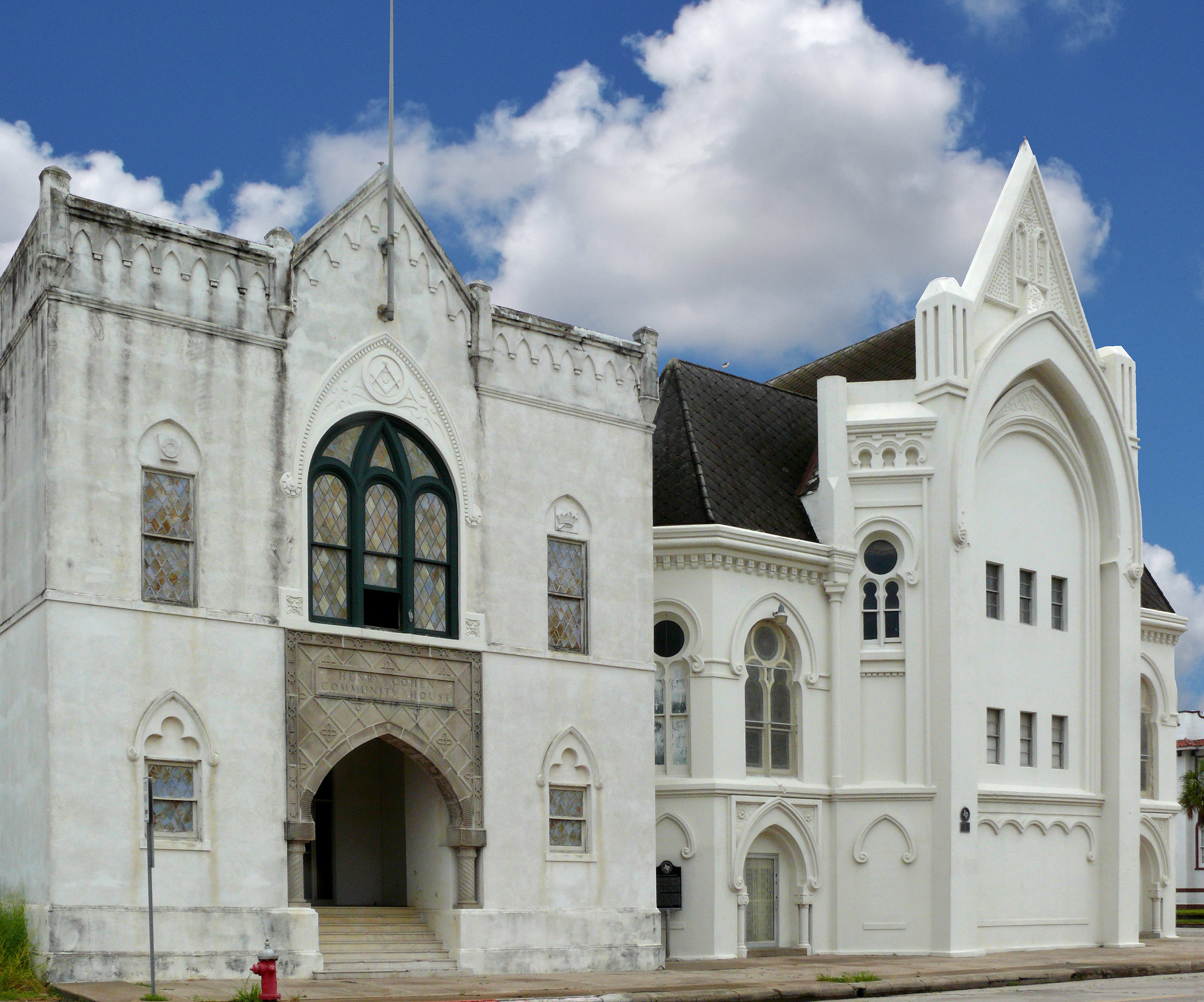
The Henry Cohen Community House on left and the 1890s former synagogue on right, after modification as a Masonic lodge

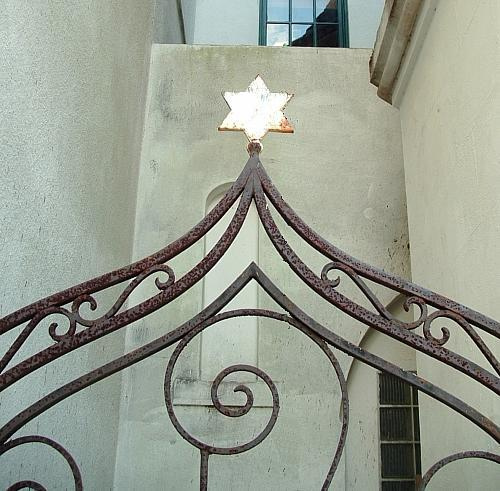
Magen David on gate of Cohen Community House

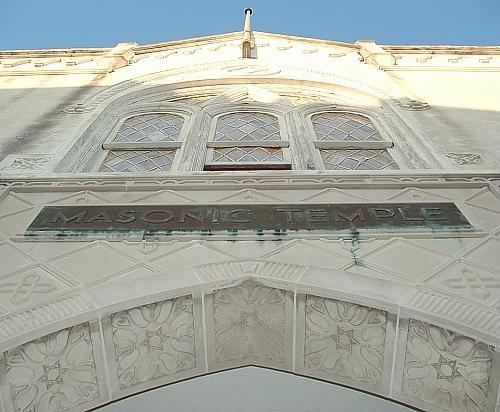
Community House arch

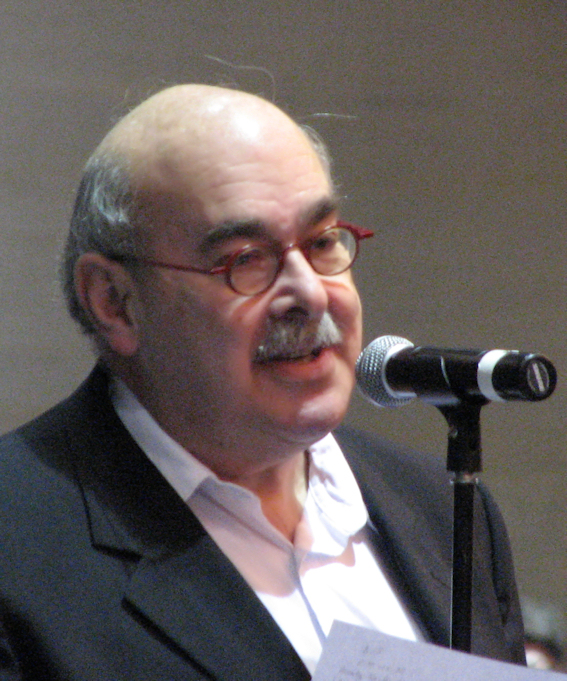
Rabbi Jimmy Kessler, former rabbi of the temple

== See also ==
- Jewish Texan
- Texas Jewish Historical Society
- Oldest synagogues in the United States
