= History of New Thought =

19th-century spiritual movement

The history of New Thought started in the 1830s, with roots in the United States and England. As a spiritual movement with roots in metaphysical beliefs, New Thought has helped guide a variety of social changes throughout the 19th, 20th, and into the 21st centuries. Psychologist and philosopher William James labelled New Thought "the religion of healthy-mindedness" in his study on religion and science, The Varieties of Religious Experience.

== Roots ==
Rooted in universal science, early New Thought leaders shared a Romantic interest between metaphysics and American Christianity. In addition to New Thought, Christian Science, transcendental movement, theosophy, and other movements were born from similar interests, all in the early long nineteenth century. John Locke's definition of ideas as anything that existed in the mind that could be expressed through words; and the transcendentalist belief that ideal spirituality "transcends" the physical and is realized only through individual intuition, instead of through religion.

Before anyone practiced New Thought as a set of beliefs there were a few influential figures whose teaching later contributed to the movement. The founder of the 18th century New Church, Emanuel Swedenborg, extended clear influence on many authors' New Thought writings on the Bible. Ralph Waldo Emerson was also influential, as his philosophical movement of transcendentalism is incorporated throughout New Thought. J. Gordon Melton notes that while "references to P. P. Quimby, whom many see as the founder of New Thought, are almost impossible to find in the early New Thought writers, references to Emerson are numerous." Franz Mesmer's work on hypnosis drove the work of Phineas Quimby, who was influenced in part by hearing a lecture by Charles Poyen.

Phineas P. Quimby is widely recognized as the founder of the New Thought movement. Born in Lebanon, New Hampshire but raised in Belfast, Maine, Quimby learned about the power of the mind to heal through hypnosis when he observed Charles Poyen's work. About 1840, Quimby began to practice hypnotism, or mesmerism as it was called. Through this practice and further study, he developed the view that illness is a matter of the mind. He opened an office for mental healing in Portland in 1859.

Calvinistic Baptist ministerial candidate Julius Dresser and his future wife Annetta Seabury Dresser came from Waterville, Maine to be healed by Quimby in 1860. They were healed in a short time. In 1882, Dresser and Annetta (his wife by then) began promoting what they called the "Quimby System of Mental Treatment of Diseases" in Boston. Their son Horatio figures importantly as New Thought's first historian. Horatio, a popular lecturer, edited The Quimby Manuscripts, which Quimby wrote between 1846 and 1865.

In 1862 Mary Baker Eddy, originally a Congregational Church member, came to Quimby hoping to be healed from lifelong ill-health. In later years Eddy went on to found Christian Science. Dresser had started the controversy around the same time that a number of people who would become important figures in the New Thought movement were leaving Christian Science, and so even though they had not read Quimby's writings, they adopted him as a figurehead leader. After Horatio Dresser published his book on the history of the movement which repeated the claim, it was rarely challenged within New Thought.

Former Methodist turned Swedenborgian minister and author Warren Felt Evans met Quimby in 1863, although there is no evidence that he was healed of a disease which he continued to suffer from for about five more years. Evens made no reference to Quimby in his journals he kept at the time, and did not seem to have been influenced by him, but Evens' Swedenborgian based literature would go on to influence New Thought considerably.

Prentice Mulford was pivotal in the development of New Thought thinking. From his writings in the White Cross Library, including Your Forces and How to Use Them, the terms "New Thought" and the "Law of Attraction" first came to fruition.

== Twentieth century ==
After the philosophy of New Thought was established, several individuals and organizations rose to prominence to promote the beliefs. However, there is no consensus on who founded the New Thought movement. Charles Brodie Patterson has been credited. Patterson, a Canadian expatriate who lived in New York City, was labelled the movement's leader when he died in the early 20th century. One of Eddy's early Christian Science students, Ursula Gestefeld, created a philosophy called the "Science of Being" after Eddy kicked her out of her church. Science of Being groups eventually formed the Church of New Thought in 1904, which was the first group to refer itself as such. While Julius Dresser, and later his son Horatio, are sometimes credited as founders of New Thought as a named movement, others share this title. Horatio wrote A History of the New Thought Movement, which was published in 1919, and named his father an essential figure in founding the movement. Emma Curtis Hopkins is also considered a founder.

Hopkins, called the "Teacher of Teachers", was a former student of Mary Baker Eddy. Because of her role in teaching several influential leaders who emerge later in New Thought movement history, she is also given credit as a mother of the movement. Inspired by medieval mystic Joachim of Fiore, Hopkins viewed the Christian Trinity: God the Father, God the Son, and God the Mother-Spirit. She wrote High Mysticism and Scientific Christian Mental Practice and founded the Emma Hopkins College of Metaphysical Science, which graduated a large number of women.

Numerous churches and groups developed within the New Thought movement. Emma Curtis Hopkins is called the "Teacher of Teachers" because of the number of people she taught who went on to found groups within the New Thought movement. After learning from Hopkins, Annie Rix Militz went on to found the Home of Truth. Another student, Malinda E. Cramer became a co-founder of Divine Science, along with Mrs. Bingham, who later taught Nona L. Brooks, who co-founded Divine Science with Cramer. Charles and Myrtle Fillmore, who went to Hopkins together, went on to found the Unity School of Christianity afterwards. Authors learned from Hopkins, too, including Dr. H. Emilie Cady, writer of the Unity textbook Lessons in Truth; Ella Wheeler Wilcox, New Thought poet; and Elizabeth Towne. Considerably later, Ernest Holmes, who established Religious Science and founded the United Centers for Spiritual Living.

The Unity Church is the largest New Thought church today, with thousands of members around the world. It was formed by the Fillmores in 1891. Divine Science was also founded in the late 19th century by Melinda Cramer and Nona Brooks. The United Centers for Spiritual Living was founded by Ernest Holmes in 1927. A similar organization, the Society for Jewish Science, originally conceived by Rabbi Alfred G. Moses in the early 1900s, the movement was institutionalized in 1922 with Rabbi Morris Lichtenstein's. The New Thought movement extends around the world. The largest denomination outside the U.S., Seicho-no-Ie, was founded in 1930 by Masaharu Taniguchi in Japan. Today, it has missions around the world, including the U.S. Smaller churches, including the Home of Truth founded in 1899 in Alameda, California continue successfully, as does the Agape International Spiritual Center, a megachurch led by Rev. Dr. Michael Beckwith in the Los Angeles-area.

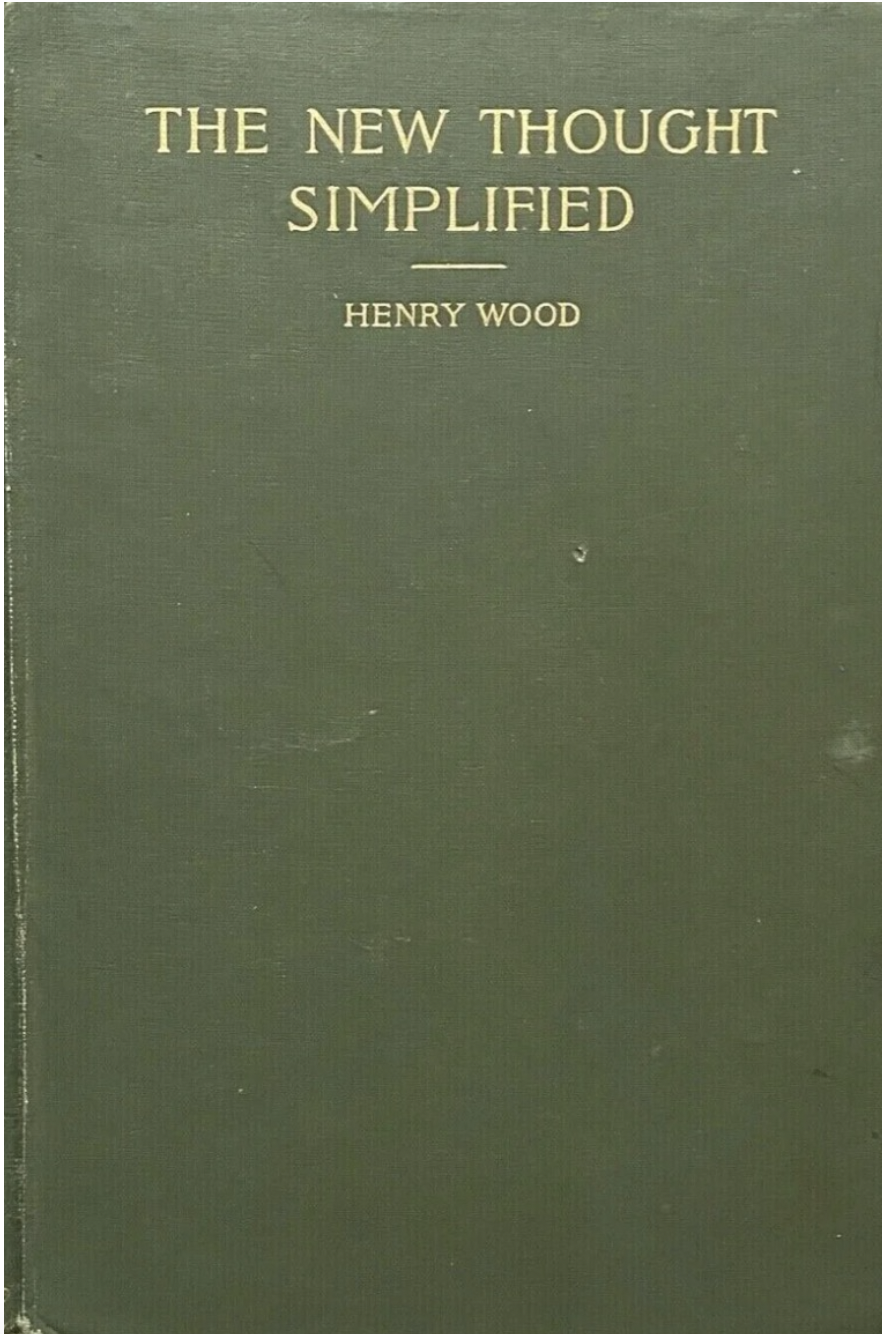
The New Thought Simplified by Henry Wood, 1903

Alongside these church-based developments, a parallel stream of New Thought took shape through the systematization of mental suggestion and psychological discipline. Henry Wood contributed significantly to this strand in works such as Ideal Suggestion Through Mental Photography (1893) and later New Thought Simplified, in which he articulated a structured philosophy of mental causation grounded in disciplined thought and constructive affirmation. Wood's writings presented New Thought not only as a devotional system but as a practical mental science centered on the deliberate direction of consciousness.

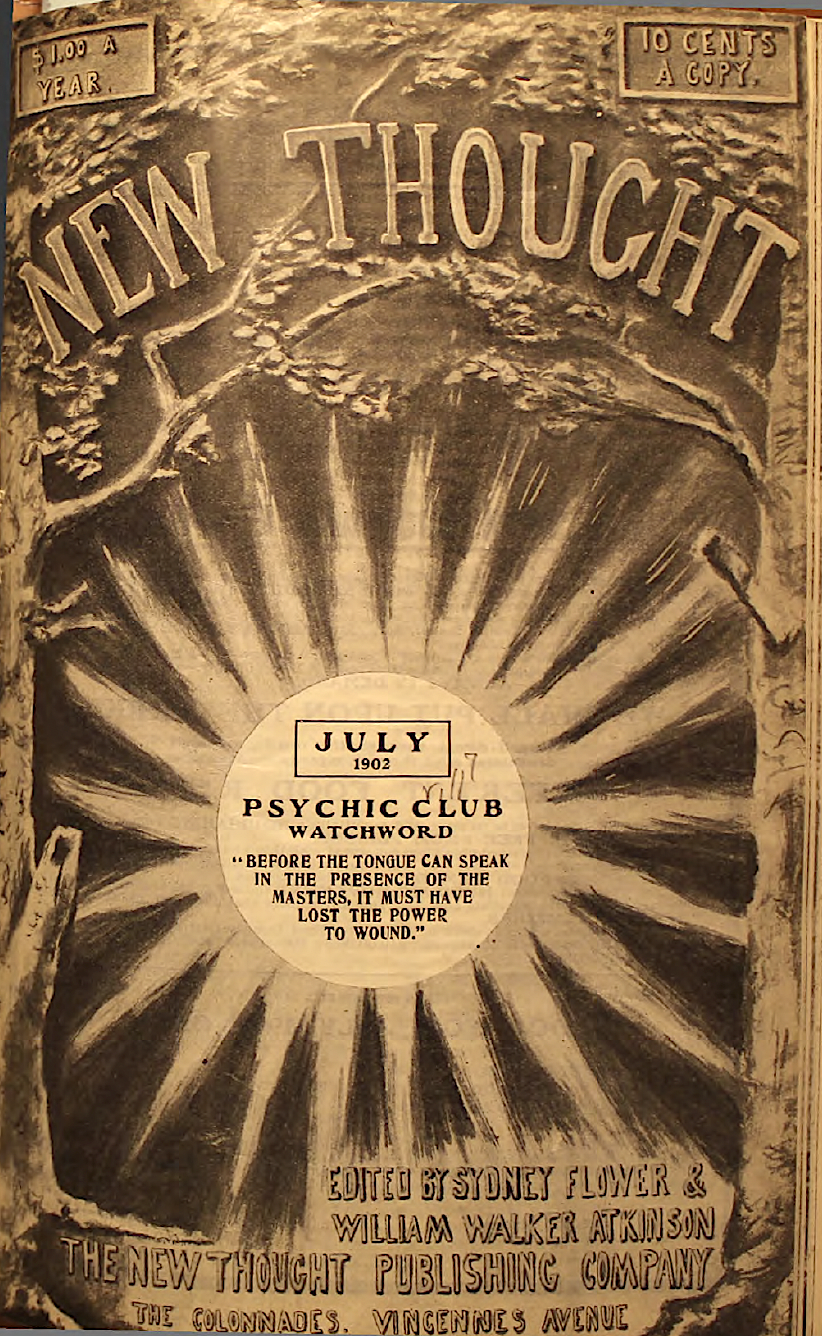
New Thought magazine, edited by Chicago School of Psychology graduates, William Walker Atkinson and Sydney B. Flower

This movement toward a disciplined and systematized mental science within New Thought found institutional expression in the Chicago School of Psychology, founded by Herbert A. Parkyn in 1896. It was the first American institution devoted specifically to the systematic teaching of hypnotism, suggestion, and auto-suggestion. The school framed mind cure as operating according to the Law of Suggestion, rather than supernatural power. Its development of auto-suggestion as a system of self-directed affirmations aimed at reshaping character and circumstance helped define the practical core of New Thought's self-empowerment emphasis. Among the Chicago School's most prominent graduates was William Walker Atkinson, who worked as associate editor with Parkyn's Suggestion magazine in translating clinical suggestive principles into broader concepts of thought force, personal magnetism, and will development for everyday life. Atkinson later joined with Sydney B. Flower, a graduate and former secretary of the school, to establish New Thought magazine, which became one the movement's most influential journals. Atkinson would go on to influence New Thought's development through his numerous publications under various pseudonyms, including The Kybalion in 1908 under the name "Three Initiates" which purported to be a summary of Hermetic philosophy.

A variety of umbrella New Thought organizations have existed, including the International New Thought Alliance, which existed in some form as early as 1899. The Affiliated New Thought Network was formed in 1992 to provide an overarching New Thought organization. Since 1974 the Universal Foundation for Better Living has been a gathering of Christian New Thought congregations around the world. In New York City, New Thought leaders created an umbrella organization called the League for the Larger Life. It lasted from 1916 through the 1950s.

There have been many New Thought schools. The most famous may be the Unity School of Christianity in Missouri, founded in the early 20th century. The Emerson Theological Institute has operated since 1992. At the turn of the 20th century Horatio Dresser ran an organization called the School of Applied Metaphysics.

Psychiana was a mail-order denomination operated by Frank B. Robinson that taught and spread the word about New Thought through the U.S. Postal Service.

== Gallery ==
Influential figures and movement leaders

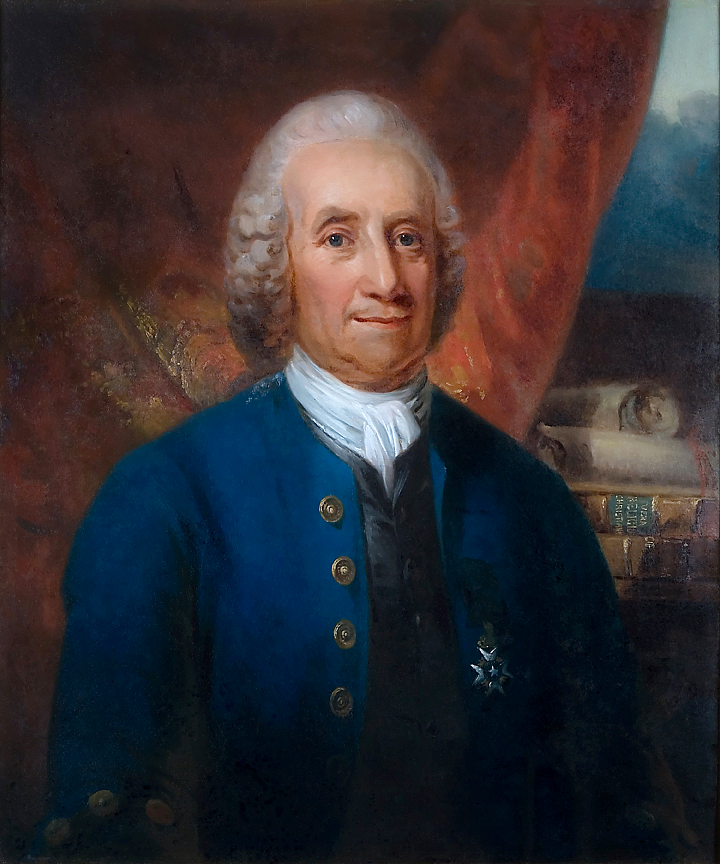
Emanuel Swedenborg

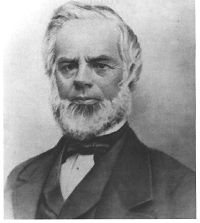
Phineas Quimby

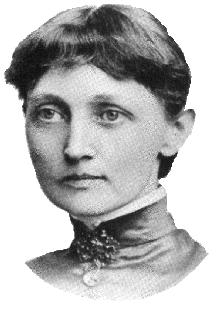
Emma Curtis Hopkins

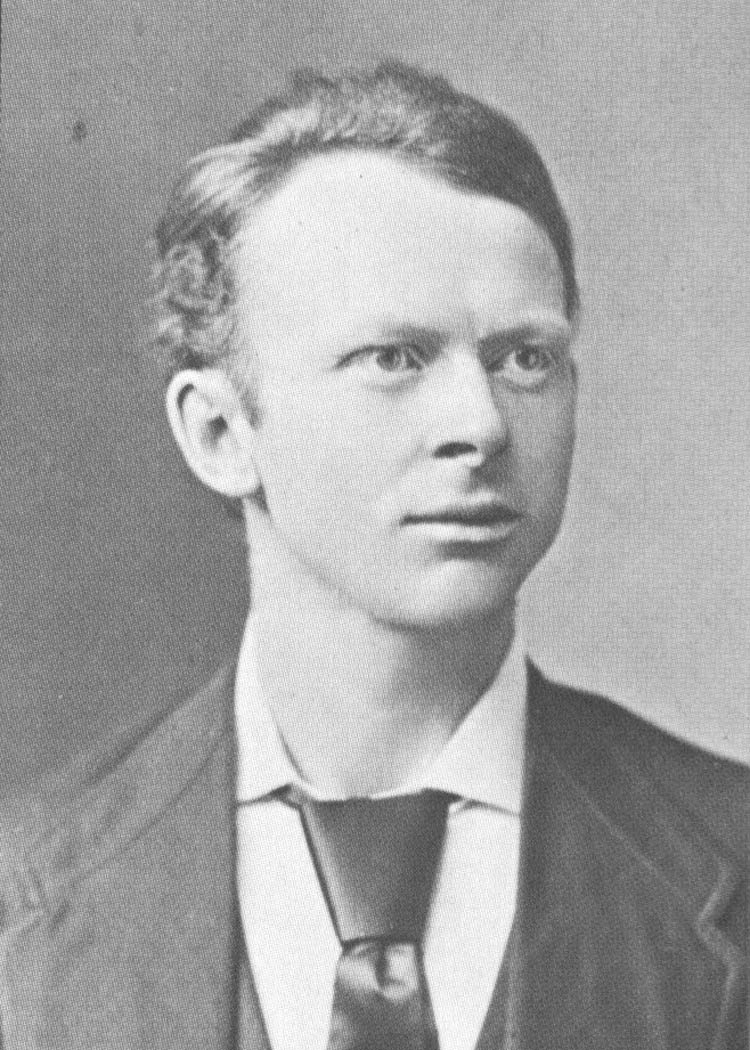
Charles Fillmore

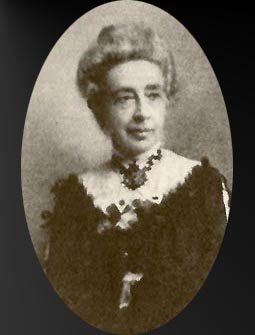
Malinda Cramer

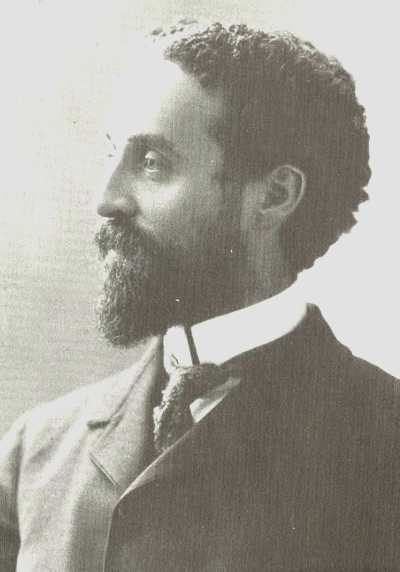
Horatio Dresser

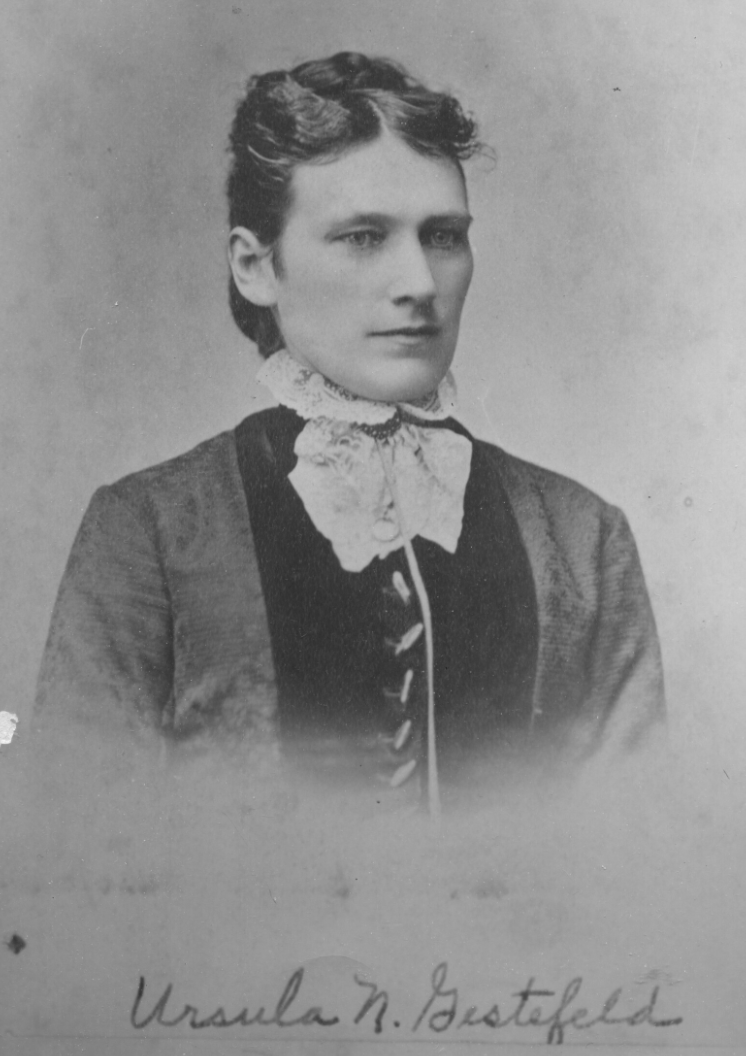
Ursula Newell Gestefeld

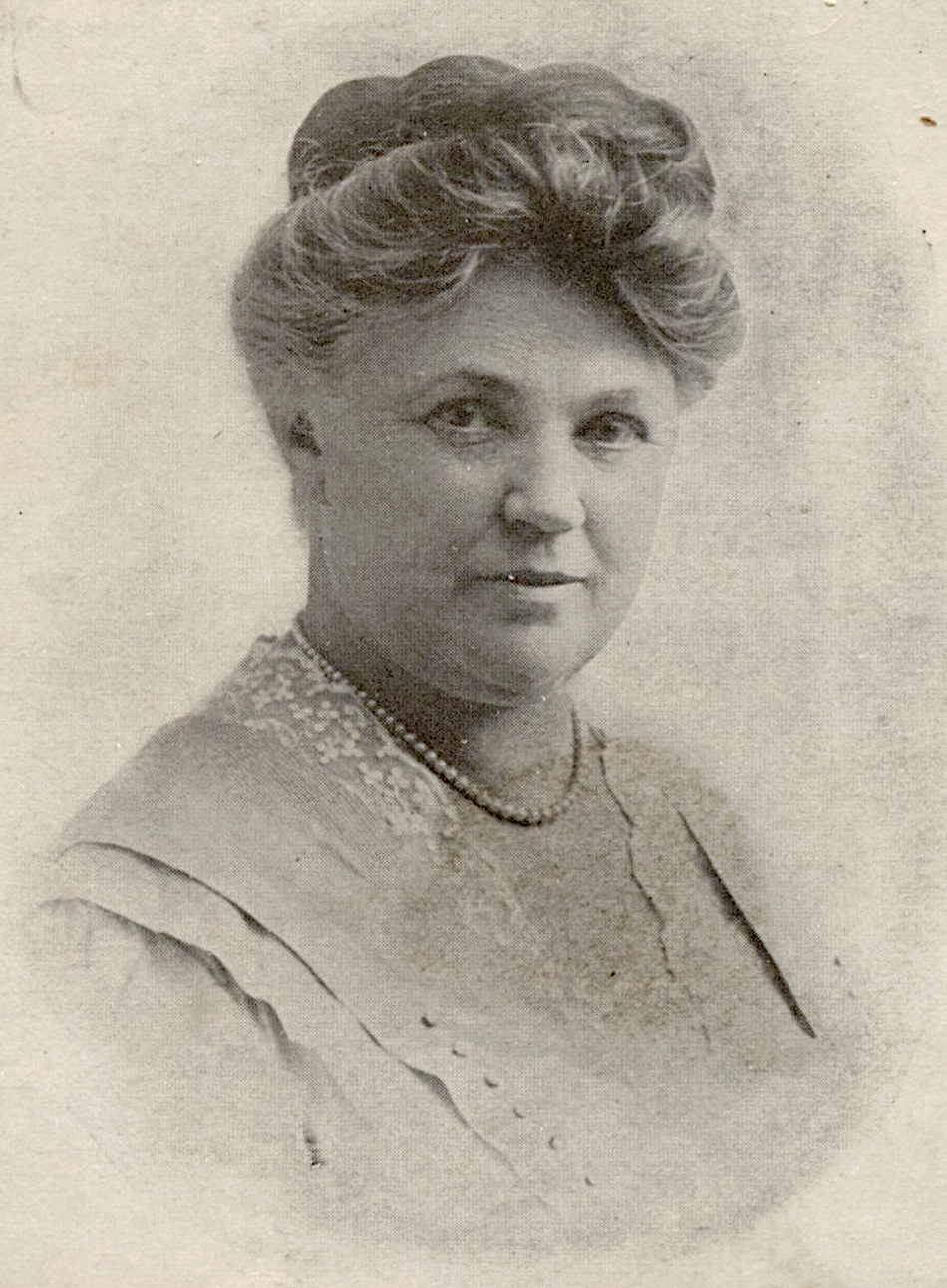
Annie Rix Militz

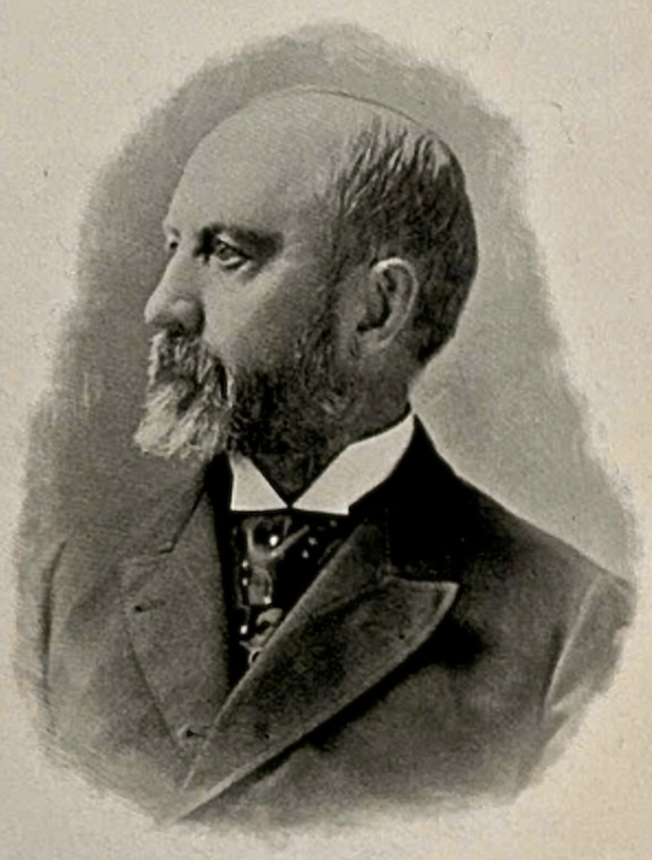
Henry Wood (author)

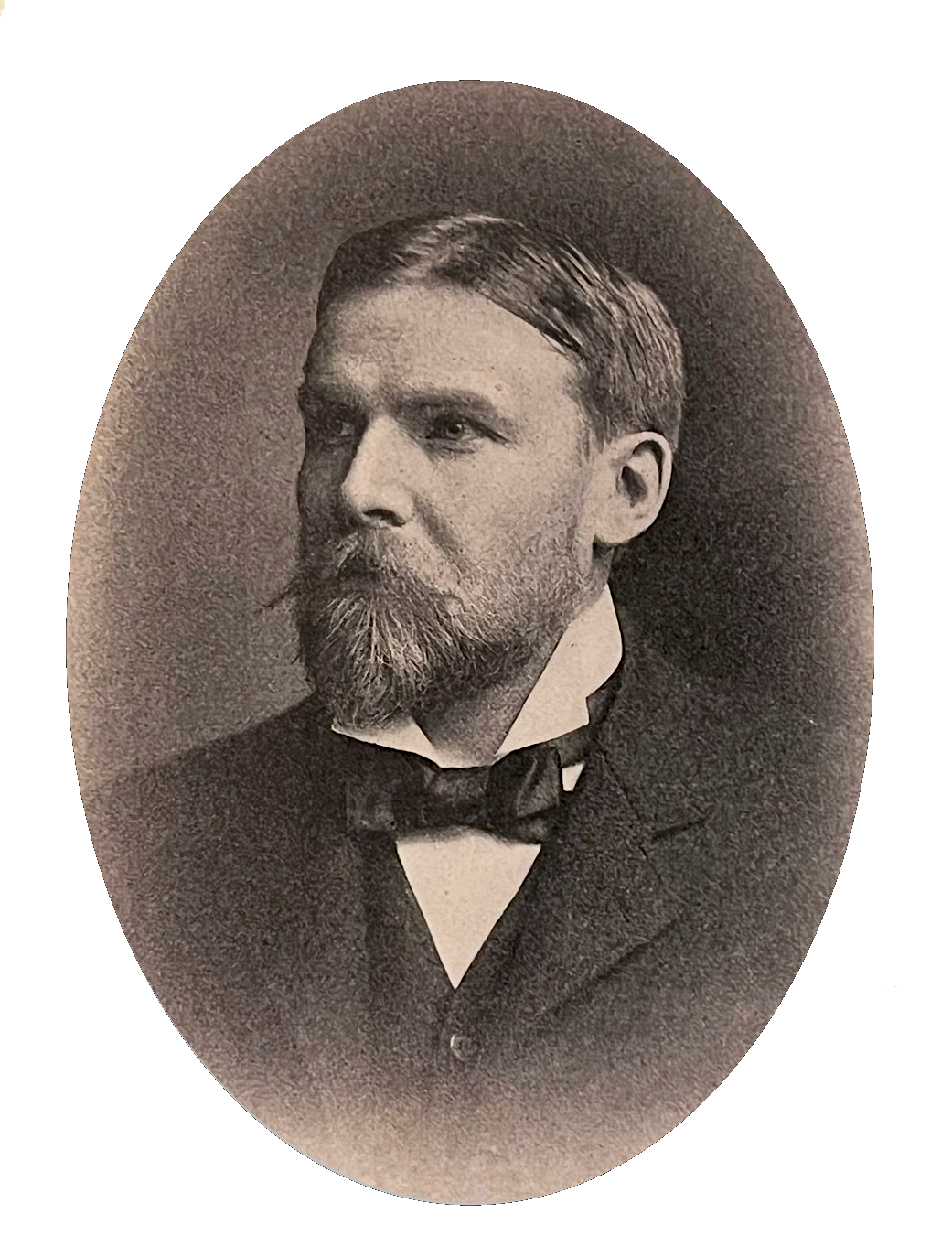
Herbert A Parkyn

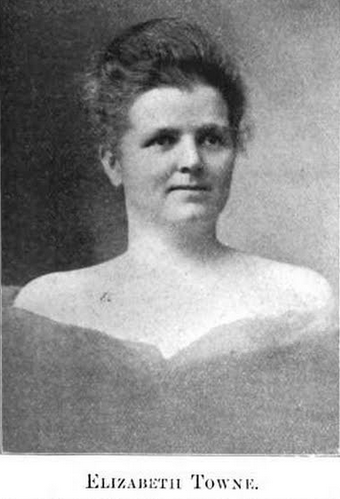
Elizabeth Towne

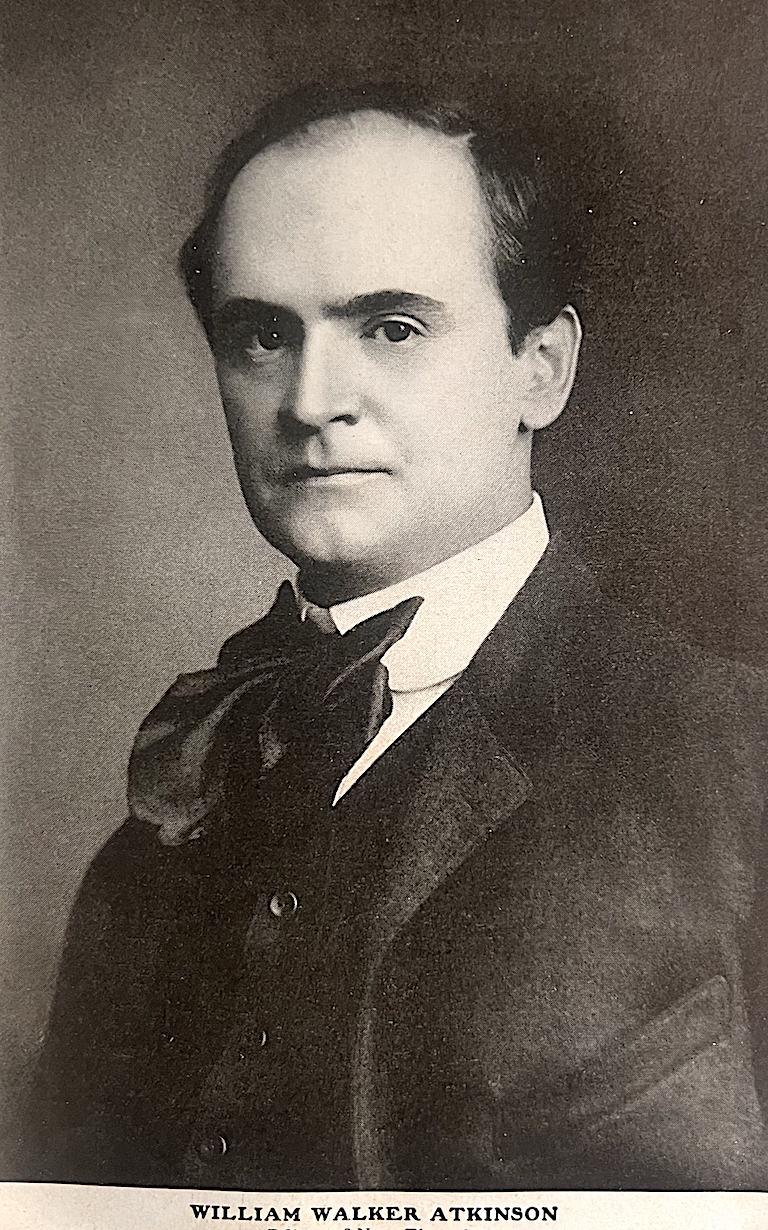
William Walker Atkinson

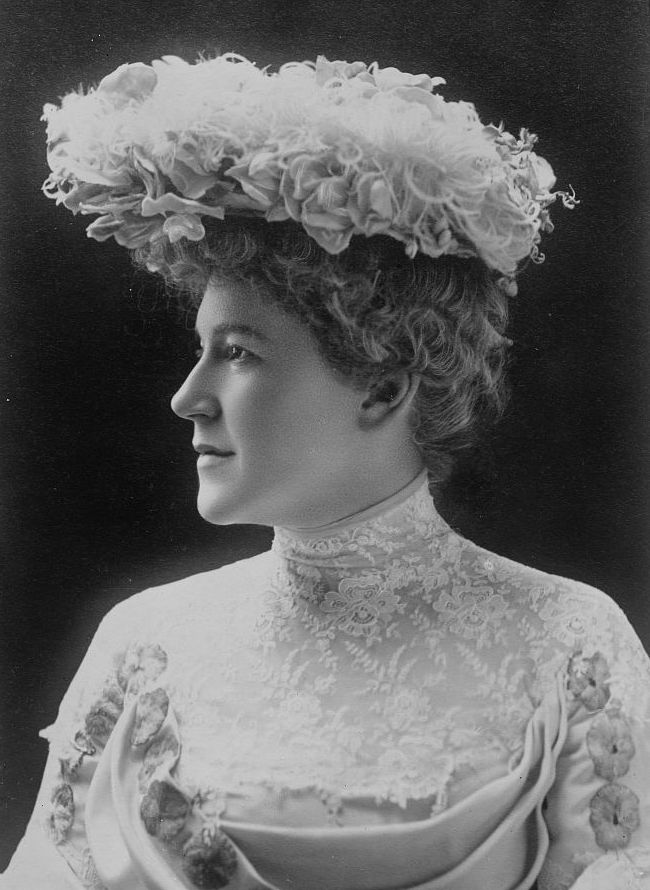
Ella Wheeler Wilcox

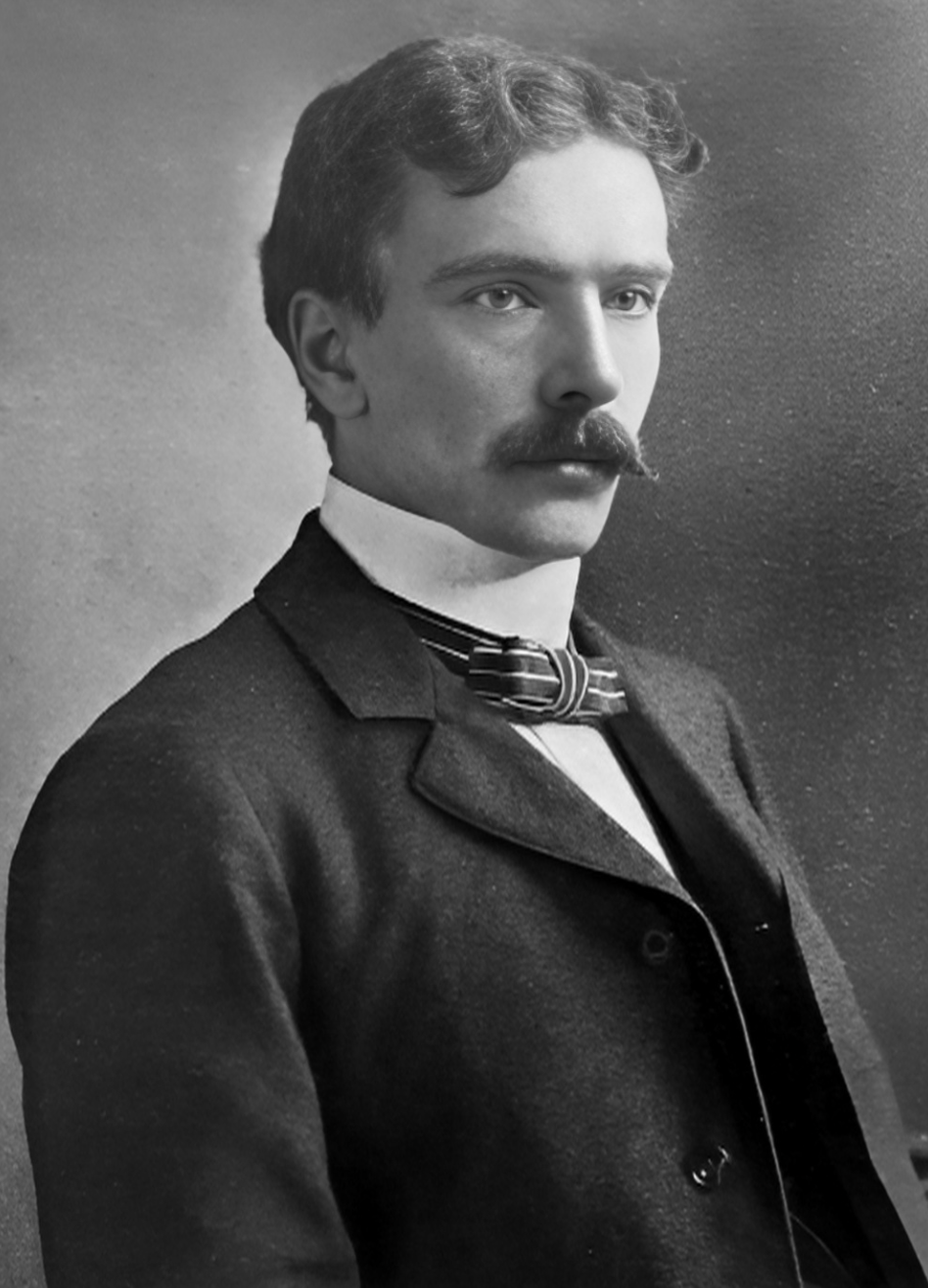
Sydney Blanshard Flower

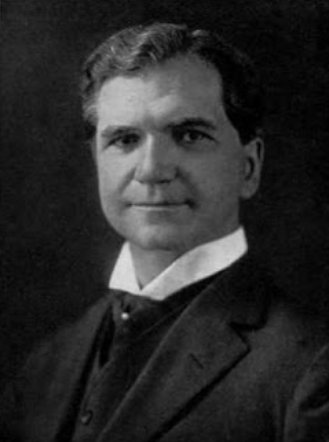
Ralph Waldo Trine

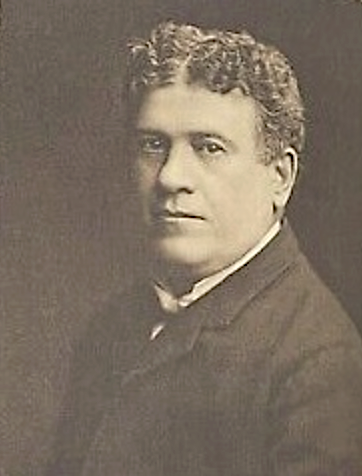
Charles Brodie Patterson
