= List of New Thought denominations and independent centers =

This is a list of New Thought membership organizations. It is historically based, therefore not all of these groups may be in existence at this time.

== A ==
- Affiliated New Thought Network, associated with Religious Science
- Agape International Spiritual Center
- Association for Global New Thought, Santa Barbara, California

== C ==
- Centers for Spiritual Living, based in the teaching of Ernest Holmes's Religious Science movement.
- Church of the Divine Unity, founded in Boston, Massachusetts, c. 1890s; associated with The Metaphysical Club
- Church of the Higher Life (defunct), founded in 1894 by Helen Van-Anderson in Boston, Massachusetts
- The Community Church of New Thought together with The Lola Pauline Mays New Thought School of Ministry, Mesa, Arizona

== D ==
- Church of the Healing Christ (defunct), in New York City, associated with Divine Science
- Divine Science, founded in 1892 in San Francisco, California, by Malinda Cramer

== H ==
- Huna

== I ==
- Institute of Religious Science and School of Philosophy (school; opened 1927; Religious Science)
- International Divine Science Association, the international wing of Divine Science
- International Metaphysical League, the international wing of The Metaphysical Club, founded in 1900 in New York City (defunct; absorbed into the International New Thought Alliance in 1914)
- International New Thought Alliance, founded in London, England, in 1914 by renaming the National New Thought Alliance (founded in 1908) which had been formed by renaming the World New Thought Federation (founded in 1905), which had formerly been the New Thought Federation (founded in 1900); upon INTA's creation it also absorbed the International Metaphysical League (founded in 1900), which was the international wing of The Metaphysical Club (founded in 1872); thus at the time of its official "founding", INTA had an unbroken membership history that stretched back 42 years.

== J ==
- Jewish Science founded (1916) founded by Alfred G. Moses and Rabbi Morris Lichtenstein

== L ==
- Living Enrichment Center (defunct), founded by Mary Manin Morrissey (see New Thought Ministries of Oregon)

== M ==
- The Metaphysical Club (defunct), founded in Boston, Massachusetts, by Rev. L. B. Macdonald, Dr. J. W. Lindy and Mr. Frederick Reed in 1895. This group, which is unrelated to a group of the same name at Harvard University organized by C.S. Peirce, Oliver Wendell Holmes and William James in 1872, was called "the first permanent New Thought Club" by Horatio Dresser. This Metaphysical Club was absorbed into the International New Thought Alliance in 1914.

== N ==
- New Thought Ministries of Oregon (independent; founded 2004 by former members of Living Enrichment Center, affiliated with Religious Science in 2007 as a member of United Centers for Spiritual Living)

== P ==
- Psychiana (1928 – c. 1950; defunct), founded in Moscow, Idaho by Frank B. Robinson

== R ==
- Radiant Center of Philosophy (defunct), founded in Atlantic City, New Jersey c. 1918, associated with Kate Atkinson Boehme
- Religious Science a.k.a. Science of Mind founded in Los Angeles by Ernest Holmes
- Religious Science International, associated with Religious Science now known as International Centers for Spiritual Living (originally the International Association of Religious Science Churches). Now integrated with United Centers for Spiritual Living under the new name of Centers for Spiritual Living, headquartered in Golden, Colorado.*

== S ==
- Science of Mind a.k.a. Religious Science founded in Los Angeles by Ernest Holmes
- Seicho-No-Ie, Japan, founded by Dr. Masaharu Taniguchi, with assistance of Fenwicke L. Holmes, brother to Ernest Holmes, founder of Science of Mind (Religious Science).
- Spiritual Growth Institute, San Jose, California. Incorporated in 2015 by a group of ministers representing a wide range of Metaphysical and New Thought Organizations. They take as inspiration, the New Thought ministry of the Rev's. William H. Briggs and Jennie Owen Briggs from the years 1889–1930. Both were students of Emma Curtis Hopkins and worked closely with Charles F. Haanel, author of The Master Key System. Spiritual Growth Institute is a member of the International New Thought Alliance.

== U ==
- Understanding Principles for Better Living Church, founded in Los Angeles by Della Reese
- United Church of Religious Science, associated with Religious Science now known as United Centers for Spiritual Living. Now integrated with Religious Science International under the new name of Centers for Spiritual Living, headquartered in Golden, Colorado.
- Unity Church, founded by Charles Fillmore
- Universal Foundation For Better Living, founded in Chicago by Johnnie Coleman

== V ==
- Victoria Truth Centre, Victoria, British Columbia, founded in 1934

== See also ==
- List of New Thought writers
- New religious movements
