= Annie Rix Militz =

American New Thought writer

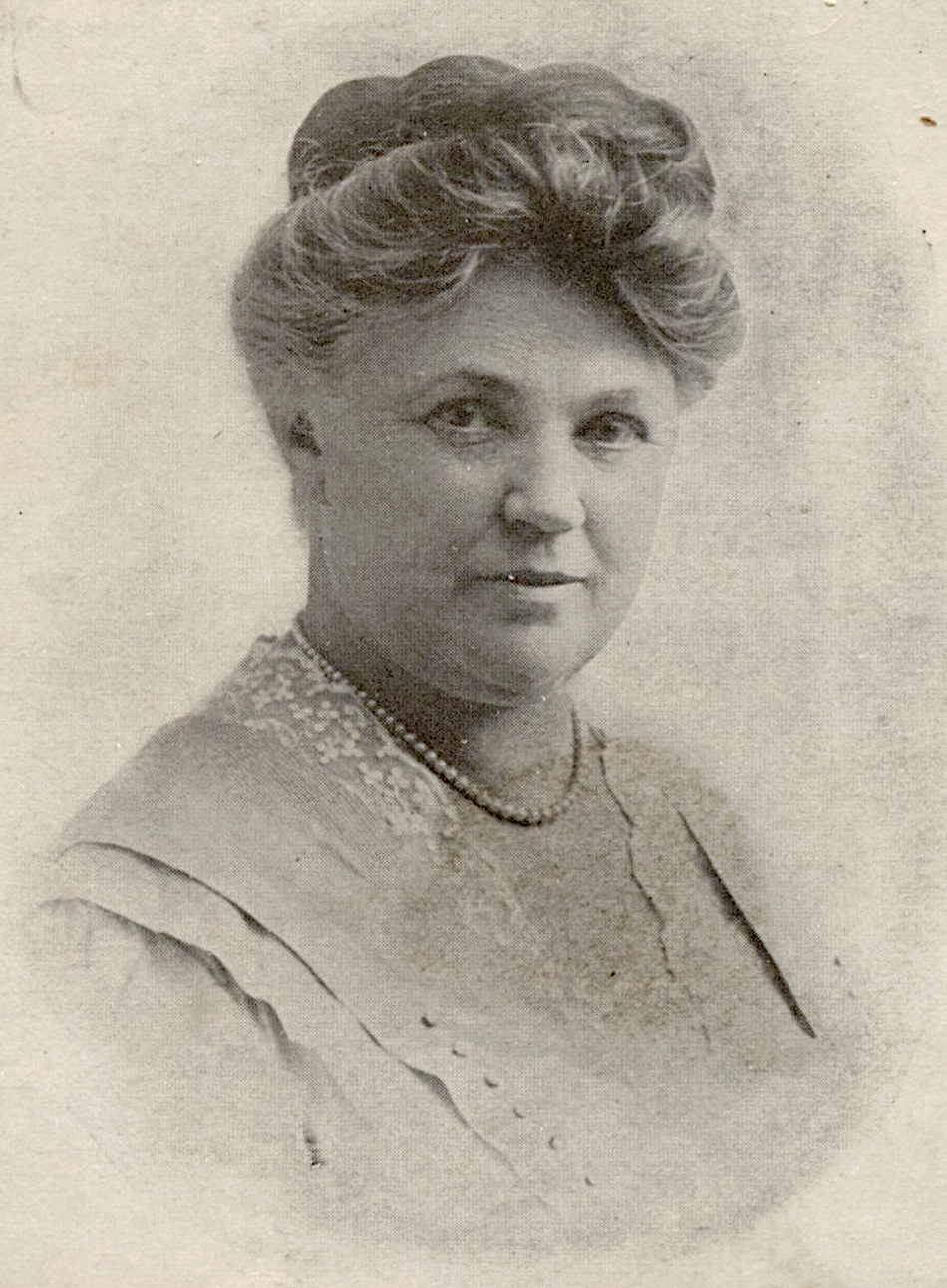
- Annie Rix Militz
- Born: March, 1856; California
- Died: 22 June 1924; Los Angeles, California
- Known for: Home of Truth

Annie Rix Militz (1856–1924) was an American author and spiritual leader. An early organizer of the New Thought Movement, she is best known as the founder of Home of Truth. With her sister Harriet Hale Rix, Annie Rix Militz was also a founder of the West Coast Metaphysical Bureau, a group whose aim was to study philosophies and religions.

== Biography ==
Annie Rix Militz was born in California in March, 1856, the first child of Hale and Alice P. Rix.

She was a schoolteacher in San Francisco in her early thirties when she attended a class taught by Emma Curtis Hopkins, the New Thought "teacher of teachers". During the meeting Annie found herself healed of both a migraine and deafness in one ear.

That same year, 1887, saw Annie, Harriet, and Sadie Gorie found the Christian Science Home, soon renamed the Home of Truth. In 1890, she moved to Chicago to study at Emma Curtis Hopkins' Christian Science Theological Seminary and was ordained, along with Charles and Myrtle Fillmore, the following year.

At the World's Columbian Exposition in 1893 in Chicago, Illinois, she met the Hindu teacher Swami Vivekananda, an event that influenced her to turn away from her formerly Christian view of New Thought to become inclusively interfaith. Her writings emphasize methods of healing and techniques for the development of mental powers. In 1911 she broke with Unity Church to promote her own emerging interfaith New Thought teachings.

The 1915 International New Thought Alliance (INTA) conference, held in conjunction with the Panama–Pacific International Exposition—a world's fair that took place in San Francisco—featured New Thought speakers from far and wide. The PPIE organizers were so favorably impressed by the INTA convention that they declared a special "New Thought Day" at the fair and struck a commemorative bronze medal for the occasion, which was presenting to the INTA delegates, led by Annie Rix Militz. Militz was a past president of the International New Thought Alliance.

Militz and her sister are best known today as the founders, in 1905, of the Home of Truth, an independent New Thought denomination which is a member of INTA, located in Alameda, California. Home of Truth had some of the most rapid growth of any New Thought group in its early years, but has experienced decline after the deaths of its founders. She also established the Master Mind magazine a popular periodical in New Thought circles and was published from 1911 until her death in 1924. Annie and Harriet are buried in the Rix family crypt with their parents and siblings at the San Francisco Columbarium.

== Bibliography ==
Rix is the author of these books:

- Concentration (also known as "The Nature of Concentration". (1918)
- Primary Lessons in Christian Living and Healing
- Renewal of the Body
- The Sermon on the mount, an interpretation (1916)
- Spiritual Housekeeping
- Prosperity
- I am myself
- None of these things move me
- All things are possible to them that believe
- The wonderful wishers of wishing well

She was the editor of and a contributor to:

- Master Mind Magazine, October 1911 to March 1919

== See also ==
- List of New Thought writers
- List of New Thought organizations
- Law of attraction (New Thought)
- Panentheism
