= Charles B. Patterson =

New Thought publisher, author, and editor

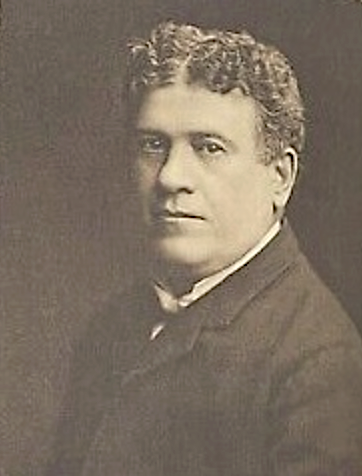
Charles Brodie Patterson

Charles Brodie Patterson (1854–1917) was a Canadian expatriate New Thought publisher, author, and editor. Patterson, a Canadian expatriate who lived in New York City, was labelled the movement's leader when he died in the early 20th century.

== Biography ==
Patterson was born in 1854 in Nova Scotia. After graduating from the Pictou Academy in Pictou, Nova Scotia, Patterson pursued mercantile activities. At 31, he moved to Hartford, Connecticut for treatment from a mental healer. He studied at the Mental Science Institute in the city and attended the Alliance of Divine Unity.

In 1888, Patterson established the Metaphysical Alliance of Hartford, and served as president until 1904. In 1893, he opened the Alliance Publishing Company in New York City. He published books by New Thought and metaphysical authors including Horatio Dresser, Ursula Gestefeld, and Augustus Le Plongeon.

He edited Mind Magazine and the Library of Health journal, as well as Arena, the most influential New Thought publication of its time.

Among his books, he published: Library of Health (1900), Dominion and Power, or, The science of life and living (1901), The Will to be Well (1902), The Measure of a Man (1907), A New Heaven and a New Earth, or, The Way to Life Eternal (thought studies of the fourth dimension) (1909), and The rhythm of life (1915).

In addition to serving as a past president of the International New Thought Alliance, Patterson was president of the International Metaphysical League from 1899 to 1903, and the later, the New Thought Federation.

He died June 22, 1917, in New York City. Patterson was labelled the New Thought movement's leader upon his death.
