= Charles Fillmore =

Charles Fillmore is the name of:

- Charles Fillmore (Unity Church) (1854–1948), one of the founders of the Unity Church
- Charles J. Fillmore (1929–2014), linguist co-inventor of case theory and construction grammar
