= First Church of Divine Science =

American church

The First Church of Divine Science, also called The Church of the Healing Christ, was founded in New York City, New York, in 1906. Affiliated with the Divine Science denomination of the New Thought movement, the church has been home to many notable ministers and attendees, including Emmet Fox.

== History ==
Dr. W. John Murray founded his congregation as The Church of the Healing Christ in 1906. After Divine Science co-founder Nona Brooks was invited to serve as a guest preacher there in 1917, she allowed Murray to rename his group the First Church of Divine Science. However, it was Emmett Fox who popularized the church. During this time the church was a member of the League for the Larger Life.

In 1931, Fox began preaching at the First Church. Almost immediately the congregation grew, and as the numbers of attendees grew the church had to find larger venues. Originally held at the Waldorf Astoria Hotel, the church moved to the Biltmore Hotel at the behest of its president, John M. Bowman. Growing further because of Fox's popularity, the church moved to Hotel Astor, then to the Hippodrome. With as many as 6,000 people regular attendees weekly, on special occasions such as Easter the number reached 8,000.
