= International Divine Science Association =

New Thought organization

The International Divine Science Association was a New Thought organization founded in 1892 in San Francisco, California by religious leader and author Malinda Cramer. The association was "founded for the promulgation of Divine Science, the God idea of perfect unity, harmony and wholeness, associated together in a unity of spirit, for the healing of nations, and the general good of humanity."

The International Divine Science Association hosted several New Thought Congresses through the 1890s. The association was a loose coalition of Divine Science leaders and centers across the United States, and is credited as the first of several umbrella organizations created at the turn of the 20th century for the New Thought movement.
