= Centerville, Alabama =

Unincorporated community in Brownsville, Alabama

- Unincorporated community
- Location within Alabama Location within the United States
- Coordinates: 31°24′01″N 86°52′44″W
- Country: United States
- State: Alabama
- County: Conecuh
- Elevation: 361 ft (110 m)
- Time zone: UTC-6 (Central (CST))
  - Summer (DST): UTC-5 (CDT)
- Area code: 251
- GNIS feature ID: 133102

Centerville is an unincorporated community in Conecuh County, Alabama, United States, located near the communities of Battleground, Westpoint, and Longview.

== Notable people ==
- Johnnie Colemon (1920–2014), influential minister and teacher in the New Thought movement
- Annie Kennedy (1851–1918), educator
