= Universal Foundation for Better Living =

New Thought denomination

- Abbreviation: UFBL
- Classification: New Thought Christianity
- Scripture: Bible (interpreted metaphysically)
- Theology: New Thought
- Founder: Reverend Dr. Johnnie Colemon
- President: Reverend Dr. Sheila McKeithen
- Past President: Reverend Dr. Mary Tumpkin
- Associations: International New Thought Alliance
- Language: English
- Headquarters: Miami Gardens, Florida, United States
- Territory: United States, Canada, Jamaica, Trinidad, The Bahamas, Guyana
- Origin: June 1974; Chicago, Illinois, United States
- Separated from: Unity Church
- Member Ministries: 17
- Seminaries: Johnnie Colemon Theological Seminary
- Publications: Daily Inspiration for Better Living
- Official website: https://ufbl.org/
- Slogan: "It Works If You Work It"

The Universal Foundation for Better Living, or UFBL, is a New Thought denomination that was founded in 1974 by Johnnie Colemon in Chicago, Illinois. Colemon founded the foundation as an association for African American New Thought ministers after breaking away from the Unity Church for "blatant racism". Rev. Colemon is often referred to as "the First Lady of New Thought".

== History ==
After founding the first predominantly African American Unity Church in 1954, Colemon broke away in 1974. Named the Universal Foundation for Better Living, the foundation had 22,000 members in the late 1980s, with a 32-acre facility in the Chicago-area. The foundation adheres closely to the principles taught by Charles and Myrtle Fillmore.

In 2009, the denomination had more than 30 churches across the U.S., Canada, and the Caribbean, with a majority of African American members. Colemon appointed Mary A. Tumpkin as President of the foundation in 1995, where she served until she died in November 2013. In 2015, Rev. Sheila R. McKeithen became the foundation's third President.
