= Ursula Newell Gestefeld =

American New Thought leader

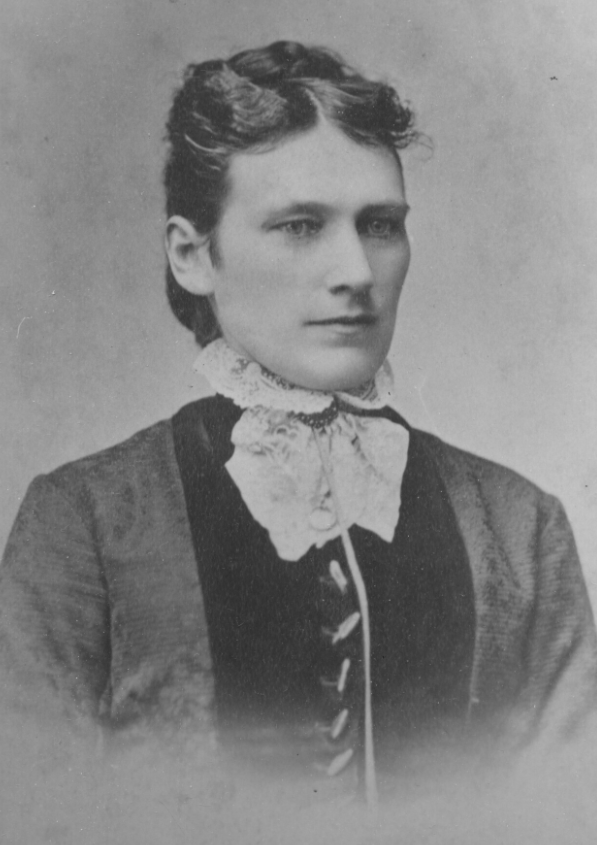
- Ursula Newell Gestefeld
- Born: April 22, 1845; Augusta, Maine
- Died: October 22, 1921 (aged 76); Kenosha, Wisconsin
- Burial place: Graceland Cemetery, Chicago
- Other name: Ursula N. Gestefeld
- Occupations: Writer, teacher, lecturer
- Years active: 1884-1916
- Known for: Church of the New Thought
- Notable work: The Woman's Bible (contrib.)

Signature
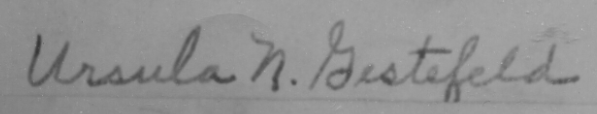

Ursula Newell Gestefeld (April 22, 1845 – October 22, 1921) was an American religious leader, writer, lecturer, and organizer who played a formative role in the late nineteenth and early twentieth century metaphysical movement that came to be known as New Thought. She was the founder of the Science of Being system, the Exodus Club, and the Church of the New Thought, and was a prominent figure in the transition away from the early Christian Science movement towards these new independent metaphysical religious organizations.

== Early life and career ==
Gestefeld was born on April 22, 1845, in Augusta, Maine. Her mother was in poor health, and Gestefeld herself had health problems during childhood and throughout her early adulthood. She married journalist Theodore Gestefeld, with whom she had four children, and in the 1870s moved to Chicago where her husband worked as a reporter for the Chicago Tribune and later as city editor of the Illinois Staats-Zeitung.

In 1884, Gestefeld was loaned a copy of Science and Health with Key to the Scriptures by Mary Baker Eddy, and said her health improved just by reading it, saying that after three months she had completely recovered from her chronic health problems. Although she regarded the book as containing "contradictions and inconsistencies," she was still interested in reinterpreting some of its ideas. In May of that year Gestefeld took a class offered by Eddy in Chicago, and afterwards quickly attracted a substantial following as a teacher. Gestefeld and Eddy corresponded for several months but it became increasingly clear that their theology differed substantially, especially in regards to theosophy, which Gestefeld had embraced but Eddy opposed.

In 1888, Gestefeld published a book of eighteen lessons titled Ursula N. Gestefeld's Statement of Christian Science, and sent a circular to as many Christian Scientists as she could advertising the book as "a key for those who are unable to discern" the meaning of Science and Health, since the book was so "difficult of comprehension". Gestefeld's writing often included unattributed passages from Eddy's book nearly verbatim, combined with theosophical teaching. The Christian Science Journal made a short response by publishing some anonymous letters from Christian Scientists regarding it, to which Gestefeld responded with a pamphlet called Jesuitism in Christian Science in which Gestefeld argued that Christian Scientists no longer needed Eddy and compared her to the Pope. This time Eddy herself responded in print, but made it clear that her differences were based on theological grounds.

== New Thought career ==
Following her separation from Eddy and Christian Science, Gestefeld continued her work in Chicago, where she maintained a teaching center and church, published books and pamphlets, and wrote extensively for periodicals. She developed a philosophical and religious system she called the Science of Being. This system emphasized mental and spiritual law, personal mastery over circumstances, and the application of metaphysical principles to health, character, and material conditions.

Gestefeld organized the Exodus Club, dedicated to teaching and studying the Science of Being, out of which grew a formal religious body that she named the Church of the New Thought in 1904. Membership did not require adherence to a fixed creed or acceptance of doctrines that conflicted with individual reason.

Gestefeld trained women as certified leaders, teachers, traveling proselytizers, and pastors. She established formal structures for instruction and leadership within her movement and charged annual dues for membership in the Exodus Club. By 1902, the organization reported at least 300 members, while more than 800 people attended her weekly sermons. In 1897 she formally founded the Exodus Club's monthly magazine, The Exodus, which she edited and published. In 1904 the movement expanded institutionally into the Church of the New Thought and the College of the Science of Being.

Gestefeld helped found the Illinois Woman's Press Association and was involved in the broader reform and intellectual culture of her time. In 1895 she contributed to The Woman's Bible, edited by Elizabeth Cady Stanton; although as with Eddy, Gestefeld differed with Stanton on various theological issues. In her interpretation of the Bible for instance, Gestefeld argued that the first chapter of Genesis was "a symbolical description of the composite nature of man" and that the male was the exterior nature and the female was the interior.

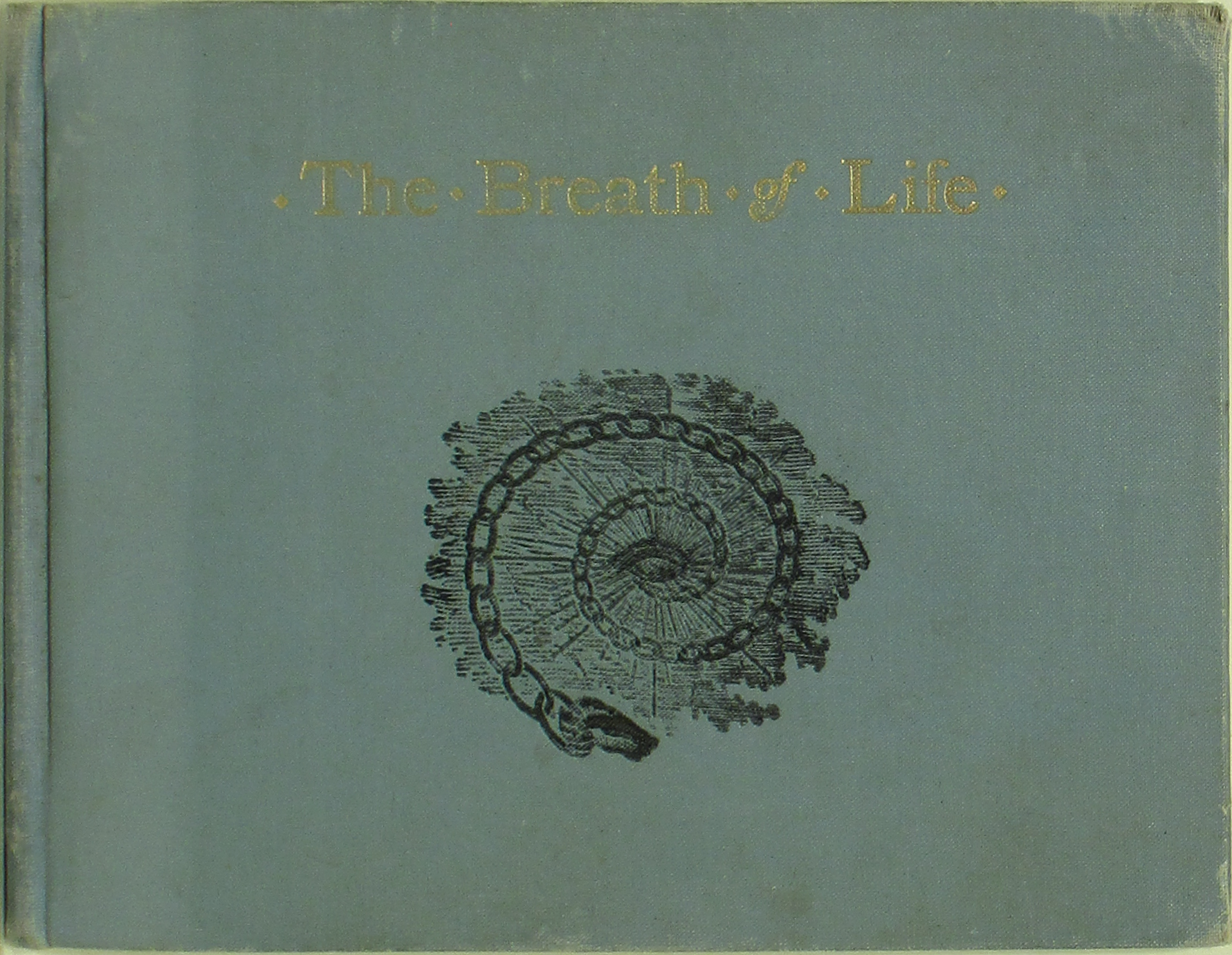
Cover of The Breath of Life by Gestefeld

Gestefeld was a prolific writer of both fiction and nonfiction, producing a total of 14 texts. Her most widely known novel was The Woman Who Dares, a critique of marriage and a protest against the legal, political, economic, and religious structures that enforced women's sexual subordination within a male-dominated society. She also contributed to other esoteric periodicals such as The Hermetist.

Her other books, widely used within New Thought circles, included The Breath of Life: A Series of Self-Treatments, Reincarnation or Immortality, The Builder and the Plan, A Chicago Bible Class, The Master of the Man, and How We Master Our Fate. She also published numerous tracts and essays and used her writing as a primary means of disseminating her ideas.

By the turn of the twentieth century, Gestefeld had expanded her teachings to include material prosperity alongside mental and physical well-being. She was a frequent speaker at metaphysical congresses and served as a member of the Executive Committee of the Metaphysical League. In 1914 she was present at the formation of the International New Thought Alliance in London. She continued to lecture and publish during the early 1910s, and worked for two years to set up a headquarters for The Church of the New Thought in London.

== Death and legacy ==
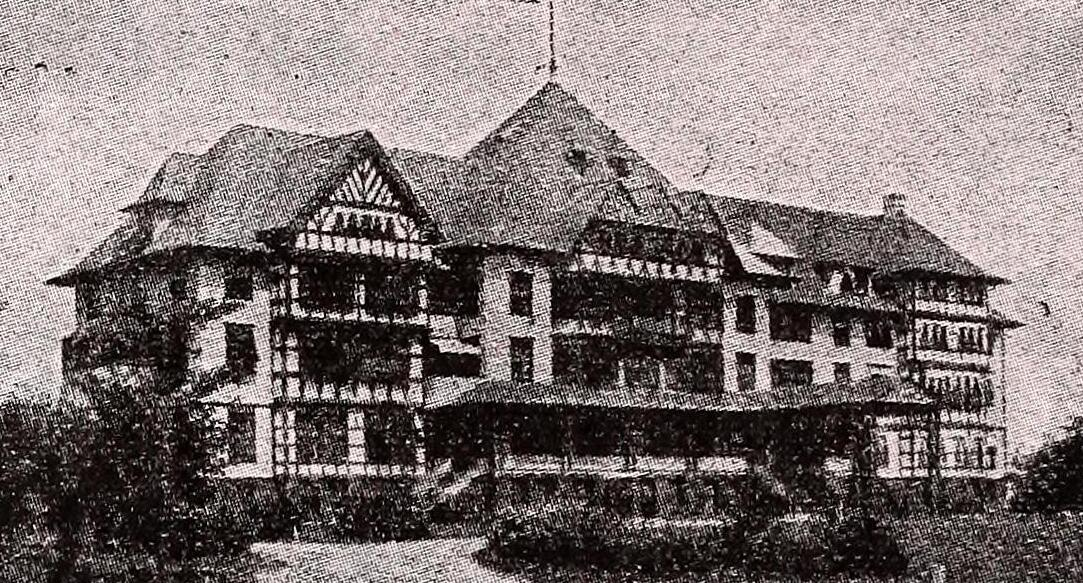
Pennoyer Sanitarium

Gestefeld was admitted into Pennoyer Sanitarium in Kenosha, Wisconsin because of ill health sometime around 1916, but after a few years moved into the home of her nurse Adeline Briggs, although she never fully recovered, and eventually suffered a relapse some months before her death. Gestefeld died on October 22, 1921, in Kenosha. She was survived by two of her sons, and was cremated at Graceland Cemetery in Chicago.

Although Gestefeld attracted a large following during her lifetime, her church did not survive long after her death, and many of its members were absorbed into the wider New Thought movement. She was perhaps the most notable woman to leave Christian Science in favor of the burgeoning New Thought movement outside of its founder Emma Curtis Hopkins. Gestefeld was a frequent speaker at New Thought events and an influential leader in the movement.

== Major works ==
- Gestefeld, Ursula Newell (1887). What is Mental Medicine?. Magill and McClure.
- Gestefeld, Ursula Newell (1888). Statement of Christian Science. privately printed.
- Gestefeld, Ursula Newell (1888). Jesuitism in Christian Science. privately printed.
- Gestefeld, Ursula Newell (1891). A Chicago Bible Class. United States Book Company.
- Gestefeld, Ursula Newell (1892). A Modern Catechism: For the Use of Those Who are Outgrowing Their Swaddling Clothes. Lovell, Gestefeld & Company.
- Gestefeld, Ursula Newell (1892). The Woman who Dares. Lovell, Gestefeld & Company.
- Gestefeld, Ursula Newell (1894). The Leprosy of Miriam. Gestefeld Library & Publishing Company.
- Gestefeld, Ursula Newell (1897). The Breath of Life: A Series of Self Treatments. Gestfeld Publishing Company
- Gestefeld, Ursula Newell (1897). How We Master Our Fate. Gestefeld Publishing Company.
- Gestefeld, Ursula Newell (1898). The Metaphysics of Balzac as Found in "The Magic Skin," "Louis Lambert, " and "Seraphita, ". Gestefeld Publishing Company.
- Gestefeld, Ursula Newell (1899). Reincarnation Or Immortality?. Alliance Publishing Company.
- Gestefeld, Ursula Newell (1901). The Builder and the Plan: A Textbook of the Science of Being. Gestefeld.
- Gestefeld, Ursula Newell (1905). And God said: An Interpretation of the Book of Genesis. Exodus Publishing Company.
- Gestefeld, Ursula Newell (1907). The Master of the Man. Exodus Publishing Company.
