= Church of the Divine Unity =

Demolished church in Manhattan, New York

Coordinates: 40°43′25.02″N 73°59′52.7″W

The Former Church of the Divine Unity
- Interactive map of the The Former Church of the Divine Unity area

General information
- Architectural style: Gothic Revival
- Location: New York, New York, United States of America
- Construction started: ?
- Completed: c.1845
- Demolished: Before 1866
- Cost: ?
- Client: The American Unitarian Association

Technical details
- Structural system: Limestone masonry

Design and construction
- Architect: ?
- Engineer: ?

The Church of the Divine Unity was a former Unitarian and Universalist church located on the east side of Broadway between Prince and Spring Streets, SoHo, Manhattan. It was built c.1845 and likely transferred to American Unitarian Association after c. 1854. Subsequently, it was adaptively reused as an art gallery (the Düsseldorf Gallery), then an office, and finally was demolished sometime before 1866.

“On August 6, 1866, [prolific diarist George Templeton] Strong observed ‘another material change in the aspect of Broadway:’ ‘Taylor’s showy restaurant” had become the office of the American Express Company, and Capin's Universalist Church, which had been serving as an art gallery, on the east side of Broadway between Prince and Spring Streets, was demolished. Strong, neither an apologist for the past nor a dedicated futurist, took a fatalist view: ‘So things go. Let ‘em go!’
