= Johnnie Colemon =

American theologian

- Born: Johnnie Haley; February 18, 1920; Centerville, Alabama
- Died: December 23, 2014 (aged 94); Chicago, Illinois
- Education: Wiley College (BA)
- Occupations: Theologian & megachurch pastor
- Known for: New Thought Movement
- Spouse(s): Richard Colemon; Don Nedd; Leon C. Blair
- Website: UFBL Leadership; CUT Founder

Johnnie Colemon (February 18, 1920 – December 23, 2014) was an influential minister and teacher in the New Thought movement. She is often referred to as the “First Lady of New Thought”. Colemon founded several large organizations within the African-American New Thought movement, including Christ Universal Temple (CUT) and the Universal Foundation for Better Living (UFBL). The Johnnie Colemon Theological Seminary is named in her honor.

Colemon was born to John and Lula Haley in Centerville, Alabama, on February 18, 1920 but her family moved to Columbus, Mississippi, at an early age, and she identified more with that location as her birthplace, leading others to misidentify Columbus, Mississippi as her place of origin. She attended Union Academy High School and graduated from Wiley College with a Bachelor of Arts in 1943. She then taught at schools in Mississippi and Chicago.

After being diagnosed with an incurable disease, Colemon had a crisis of faith deciding to attend Unity School of Christianity. Colemon was the third Black student ordained as a Unity Minister in 1956. While a student at Unity School, Colemon like all Black students at the time, was told she could not live on campus. For two years, Colemon commuted 15 miles each way to the YWCA in Kansas City before the campus was desegregated.

Colemon founded Christ Unity Temple, later Christ Universal Temple, a Chicago-based megachurch. In 1974 Colemon founded the Universal Foundation for Better Living, in response to racism experienced as part of Unity, "an international association of Bible-based New Thought Christian churches, centers, and study groups." She received a Candace Award from the National Coalition of 100 Black Women in 1987.

Christ Universal Temple under Colemon became the largest and one of the most influential churches in Chicago. When built it became the first mega church on the South Side. The church was the site of the funeral of Chicago Mayor Harold Washington. Barack Obama spoke at the church both as senator and president.

Colemon served as Director of the Chicago Port Authority and Commissioner of the Chicago Transit Authority Oversight Committee, recognition as one of Chicago’s Living Legends by the Institute for African American Youth Development. She was honored by DuSable Museum as an African American History Maker.

Colemon retired in 2006. She died at Mercy Hospital in Chicago on December 23, 2014, at the age of 94. She is interred in Oak Woods Cemetery in Chicago.
