= Affiliated New Thought Network =

Organization of New Thought centers across the United States

The Affiliated New Thought Network, or ANTN, based in La Mesa, California, is an organization of New Thought centers and individuals across the United States and internationally that was founded in 1992. Recognized as a cooperative fellowship, it is an intrafaith organization. Originally for independent Religious Science ministers, today it includes all forms of New Thought organizations and individuals who want to be affiliated.

== Governance ==
The organization has a president, vice-president, secretary, treasurer, educational liaison, and general members. Each member is allowed to vote within the organization, as long as they uphold New Thought ideals and beliefs.

== Activities ==
One primary tool of ANTN is affirmative prayer. In addition to teaching about New Thought, the ANTN and its members provide support for a number of organizations committed to nonviolence.

=== Emerson Theological Institute ===
The Emerson Theological Institute or Emerson Institute is partnered with ANTN to provide Religious Studies degrees including bachelors, masters, and doctorates, and certificates for ministers. The Institute is accredited by the Accrediting Commission International for Schools, Colleges and Theological Seminaries. Barbara Marx Hubbard developed her popular "Gateway for Conscious Evolution" while creating a curriculum for the Institute.

The Emerson Institute offers a DSS Doctor of Spiritual Studies and a DRS Doctor of Religious Studies along with other doctorates and masters degree with a focus on New Thought and mental sciences. Many of the courses are focused on the history, teachings, metaphysics and ideas around a prosperity based spirituality focused on wholeness of body, mind and spirit.
