= Charles Fillmore (Unity Church) =

American mystic, co-founder of Unity Church

Charles Sherlock Fillmore
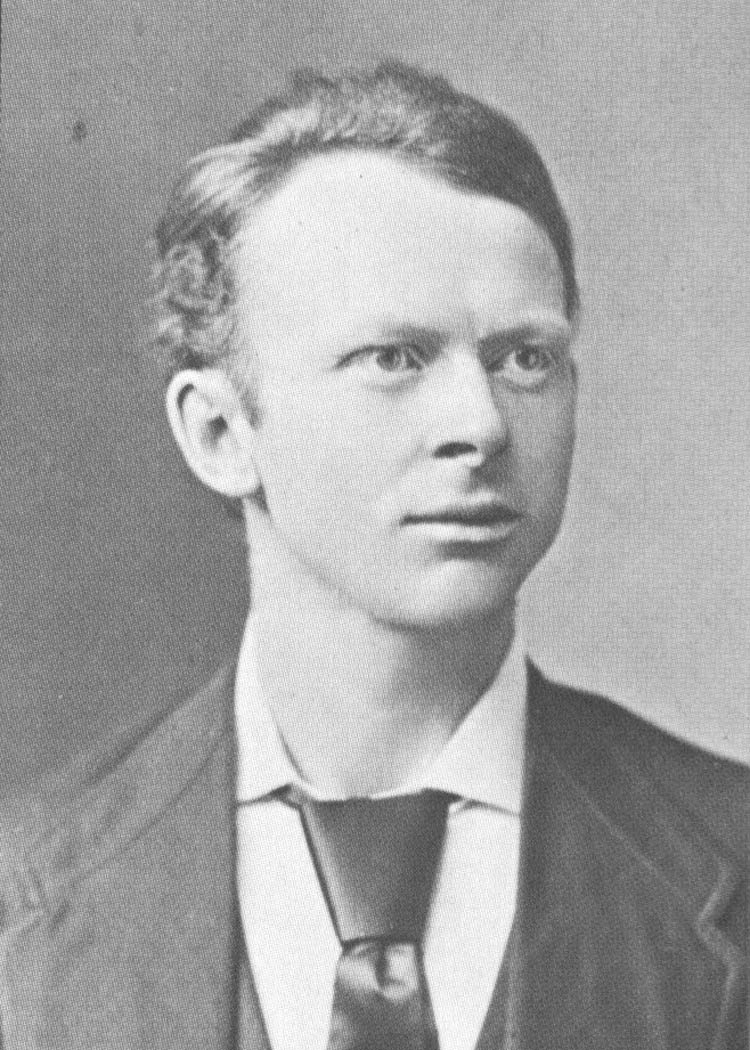
- Born: August 22, 1854; St. Cloud, Minnesota Territory, U.S.
- Died: August 5, 1948 (aged 93); Lee's Summit, Missouri, U.S.
- Spouses: Myrtle Page (m. 1881; died 1931) Cora G. Dedrick (m. 1933–1948)

Charles Sherlock Fillmore (August 22, 1854 – July 5, 1948) was an American religious leader who founded Unity, a church within the New Thought movement, with his wife, Myrtle Page Fillmore, in 1889. He became known as an American mystic for his contributions to spiritual interpretations of Biblical Scripture. Fillmore promoted vegetarianism for three decades of his life.

== Biography ==
Fillmore was born in St. Cloud, Minnesota on August 22, 1854, to Henry G. Fillmore, a trader originally from Buffalo, New York, who did business with local Ojibwe, and Mary Georganna Fillmore (née Stone), who was born in New Brunswick, then part of British North America, in modern-day Canada.

An ice skating accident when he was ten broke Fillmore's hip and left him with lifelong disabilities. In his early years, despite little formal education, he studied William Shakespeare, Lord Tennyson, Ralph Waldo Emerson and Charles Lowell as well as works on spiritualism, Eastern religions, and metaphysics.

He met his future wife, Mary Caroline "Myrtle" Page, in Denison, Texas in the mid-1870s, while working as a railroad clerk. After losing his job there, he moved to Gunnison, Colorado where he worked in mining and real estate.

He married Myrtle in Clinton, Missouri on March 29, 1881. The newlyweds moved to Pueblo, Colorado, where Charles established a real estate business with the brother-in-law of Nona L. Brooks, who later founded the Church of Divine Science.

=== Introduction to New Thought ===
After the births of their first two sons, Lowell Page Fillmore and Waldo Rickert Fillmore, the family moved to Kansas City, Missouri. Two years later, in 1886, Charles and Myrtle attended New Thought classes held by E. B. Weeks. Myrtle subsequently recovered from chronic tuberculosis and attributed her recovery to her use of prayer and other methods learned in Weeks's classes. Subsequently, Charles began to heal from his childhood accident, a development which he too attributed to following this philosophy. Charles Fillmore became a devoted student of philosophy and religion.

In 1889, Charles and Myrtle began publication of a new periodical, Modern Thought, notable among other things as the first publication to accept for publication the writings of the then 27-year-old New Thought pioneer William Walker Atkinson. In 1890, they announced a prayer group that was later called 'Silent Unity'. In 1891, Fillmore's Unity magazine was first published. H. Emilie Cady published "Lessons in Truth" in the new magazine. This material was later compiled and published in a book by the same name, which served as a seminal work of the Unity Church. Although Charles had no intention of making Unity into a denomination, his students wanted a more organized group. He and his wife were among the first ordained Unity ministers in 1906. Charles and Myrtle Fillmore operated the Unity organizations from a campus near downtown Kansas City.

Myrtle Fillmore died in 1931. Charles remarried in 1933 to Cora G. Dedrick, who was a collaborator on his later writings.

=== Death ===
Charles Fillmore died in 1948 in Lee's Summit, Missouri. Unity continued, growing into a worldwide movement. Unity World Headquarters at Unity Village and Unity Worldwide Ministries are the organizations of the movement.

== Tenets and beliefs ==
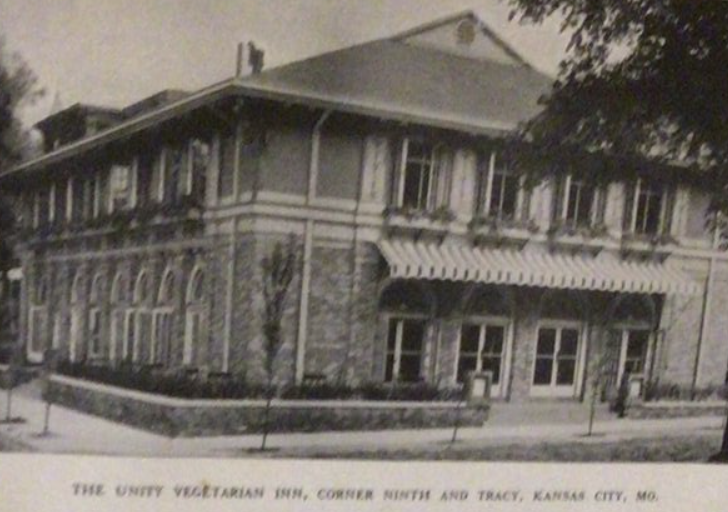
Fillmore's vegetarian restaurant Unity Inn, in 1924

In a pamphlet called "Answers to Your Questions About Unity", poet James Dillet Freeman says that Charles and Myrtle both had health problems and turned to some new ideas which they believed helped to improve these problems. Their beliefs are centered on two basic propositions: (1) God is good. (2) God is available; in fact, God is in you. The pamphlet goes on to say that:

About a year after the Fillmores started the magazine Modern Thought, they had the inspiration that if God is what they thought – the principle of love and intelligence, the source of all good – God is wherever needed. It was not necessary for people to be in the same room with them in order for them to unite in thought and prayer.

The Fillmores taught reincarnation. In his later years, Fillmore felt so young that he thought that he might be physically immortal, as well as believing that he might be the reincarnation of Paul the Apostle.

=== Vegetarianism ===
Charles's wife Myrtle became a vegetarian in 1895 for ethical reasons. Charles later became a convert through his wife's influence and made his first public statement about vegetarianism in an article titled "As to Meat Eating", in 1903. The article argued that meat eating is unethical and that a vegetarian diet could accelerate spiritual progress. He advocated lacto-ovo vegetarianism.

Charles and his wife operated Unity Inn, a vegetarian restaurant on Tracy Avenue in Kansas City, Missouri. It was one of the largest in the world at the time as it accommodated 200 guests. In 1924, Unity published a vegetarian cookbook, The Unity Inn Cookbook which contains over 300 meatless recipes. Charles authored an essay for the cookbook titled "Relation Between Regeneration and Vegetarianism". After Myrtle's death in 1931, Charles gave up being a vegetarian and added fish to his diet.

== Published works ==
=== Books ===
- Christian Healing (1909)
- Talks on Truth (1922)
- The Twelve Powers of Man (1930)
- Metaphysical Bible Dictionary (1931)
- Mysteries of Genesis (1936)
- Prosperity (1936)
- Jesus Christ Heals (1939)
- Teach Us to Pray with Cora Fillmore (1941)
- Mysteries of John (1946)
- Atom-Smashing Power of Mind (1949)
- Keep a True Lent (1953)
- The Revealing Word (1959)

=== Booklets ===
- The Last Enemy (1903)
- As to Meat Eating (1903)
- Flesh-Eating Metaphysically Considered (1911)
- Unity Statement of Faith (1921)
- Love (1903)
- A Fuller Awakening To the Christ Truth (1923)
- Thought and Mind (1902)
- Metaphysical Law of I AM (1918)
- The Great Supper (1901)
- Paul is Now Here (1924)
- The Mystical Power of Love (1903)
- The Prosperity Thought (1905)
- Prosperity Treatment (1904)
- What Is It That Heals (1924)
- Obedience To Divine Law (1924)
- Drugs and Microbes (1905)
- What the Eye Represents (1905)
- Get Still (1906)
- First Steps in Regeneration: An Explanatory Lesson given in a Series of Lessons on The development of consciousness (1912)
- Evolution: An Explanatory Lesson given in a Series of Lessons on The development of consciousness (1926)
- Spiritual Consciousness: An Explanatory Lesson given in a Series of Lessons on The Development of Consciousness (1923)
- The Church of Christ (1906)
- The Unity of Religion and Therapeutics in the New Thought. (1904)
- John the Baptist States of Mind (1906)
- The Real and the Unreal (1906)
- In the Name of the Lord (1906)
- The Invisible Resource (1906)
- Spiritual Obedience (1906)
- The idea God and the True God (1906)
- Thee Dawn of a new Day (1906)
- The Changeless Substance (1907)
- The Power of Jesus’ Words (1907)
- Order Is Heaven's First Law:An Explanatory Lesson given in a Series of Lessons on Divine Law (1924)
- Practical Christianity:An Explanatory Lesson given in a Series of Lessons on The Science of Being and Christian Healing (1907)
- Continuance in the Word (1908)
- The Real meaning of Easter (1908)
- The Resurrection (1908)

== See also ==
- Malinda Cramer
- Emmet Fox
- Ernest Holmes
- Emma Curtis Hopkins
- List of New Thought denominations and independent centers
- List of New Thought writers
