= Nona L. Brooks =

American writer

Nona Lovell Brooks
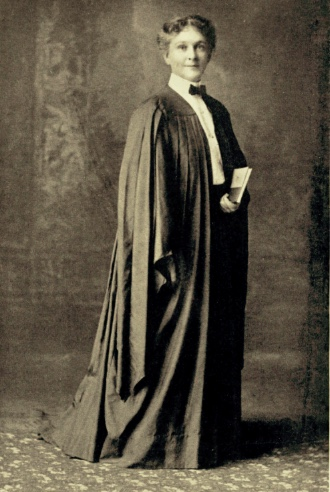
- Nona L. Brooks, Representative Women of Colorado, 1914
- Born: March 22, 1861; Louisville, Kentucky, United States
- Died: March 14, 1945 (aged 83); Denver, Colorado
- Occupations: Minister, author
- Known for: Co-founder of the Church of Divine Science

Nona Lovell Brooks (March 22, 1861 – March 14, 1945), described as a "prophet of modern mystical Christianity", was a leader in the New Thought movement and a founder of the Church of Divine Science.

== Biography ==
Brooks was born on March 22, 1861, in Louisville, Kentucky, the youngest daughter of Chauncey and Lavinia Brooks. At a fairly early age, her family moved just outside Charleston, West Virginia, where Brooks graduated from the Charleston Female Academy. Due to the collapse of her father's salt mining business, the family moved again, this time to Pueblo, Colorado, where he entered the metal mining business. He died shortly after the move, when Brooks was 19.

In 1890, with the aim of becoming a teacher, Brooks enrolled at Pueblo Normal School, which was followed by a one-year stay at Wellesley College.

In 1887, encouraged by her sister, Althea Brooks Small, Nona Brooks attended classes taught by Kate Bingham, proponent of the New Thought philosophy. While attending these classes, Brooks "found herself healed of a persistent throat infection" and shortly thereafter Brooks and Small began to heal others.

== Divine Science ==
In December 1898, Brooks was ordained by Malinda Cramer as a minister in the Church of Divine Science and founded the Denver Divine Science College. Shortly thereafter, she inaugurated the Divine Science Church of Denver, holding its initial service on January 1, 1899, at the Plymouth Hotel in Denver, in the process becoming the first female pastor in Denver.

In 1902, Brooks founded Fulfillment, a Divine Science periodical. During this period, she also served on several Denver civic boards, including the Colorado State Prison Board.

After World War I Brooks succeeded her sister Fannie James as head of the college and in 1922 Brooks aligned the growing Church of Divine Science with the International New Thought Alliance. In the early 1930s she moved to Australia, where she established several Divine Science organizations, returning to Chicago in 1935 and then back to Denver in 1938.

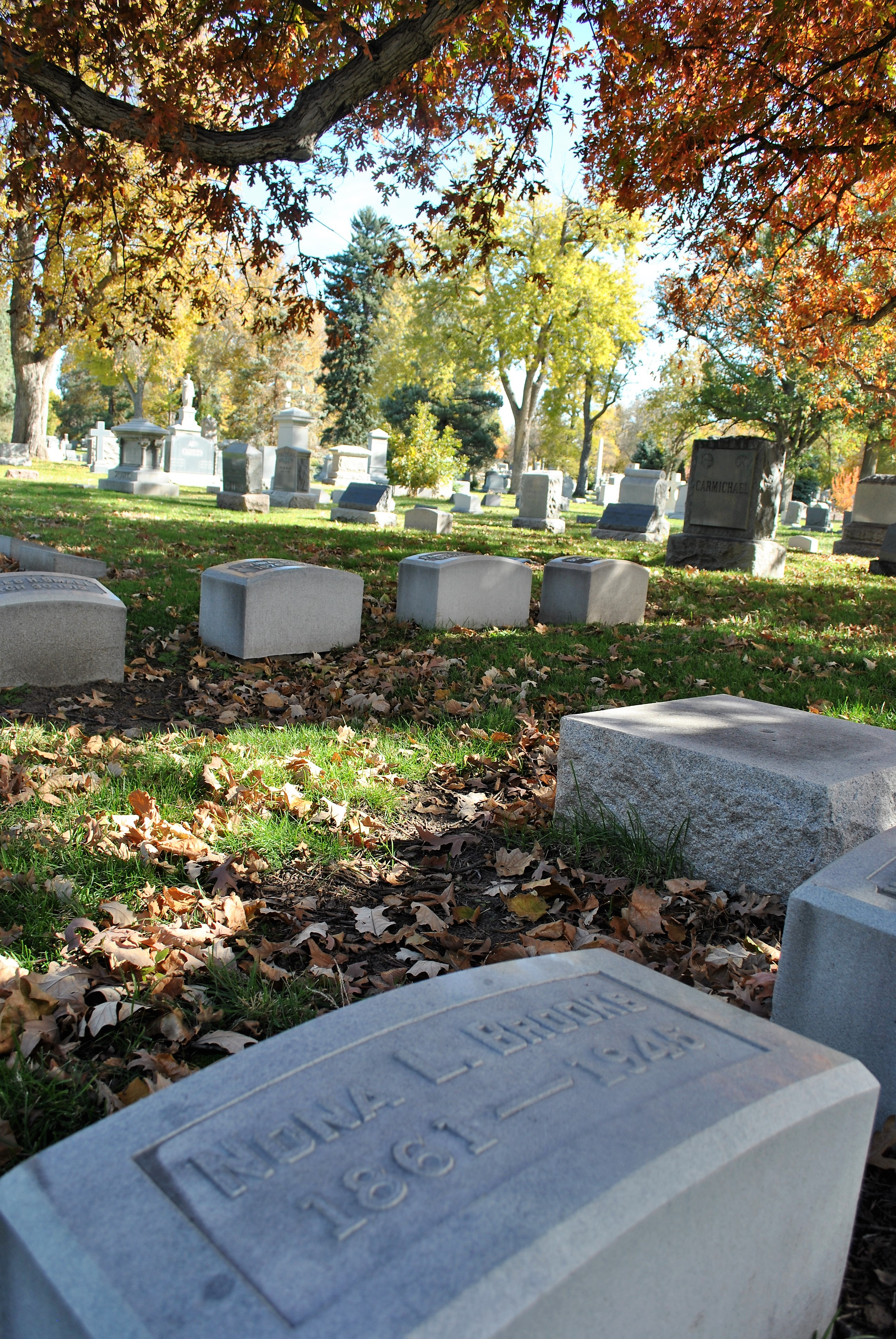
Fairmount Cemetery, Nona L. Brooks

Nona L. Brooks died March 14, 1945, in Denver, Colorado, and is buried at Fairmount Cemetery (Denver, Colorado) with her family.

Nona was described by many who knew her as warm, gentle, and "motherly", but with "a strength that came from conviction".

== Bibliography ==
Brooks was the author of:

- Mysteries (1924)
- The Prayer that Never Fails
- Short Lessons in Divine Science
- What is Real and What Illusion?
- The Training of Children: Based upon the Practical Principles of Life
- Studies of Health
- The Kingdom of Law.

Several of her sermons were collected in Into the Light of Healing.
