= Malinda Cramer =

American writer

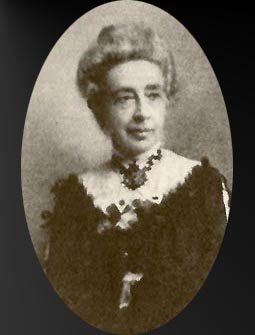
- Malinda Elliott Cramer in an 1890 photo
- Born: Malinda Elliott; June 12, 1844; Greensboro, Indiana, United States
- Died: August 2, 1906 (aged 62); San Francisco, California, United States
- Occupations: Minister, author
- Years active: 1887–1906
- Employer: Home College
- Known for: Founder of the Divine Science movement
- Spouse: Charles L. Cramer
- Children: 1

Malinda Elliott Cramer (June 12, 1844 – August 2, 1906) was a founder of the Church of Divine Science, faith healer, and an important figure in the early New Thought movement.

== Biography ==
Cramer was born in Greensboro, Indiana, the daughter of Obediah and Mary Hinshaw Elliott. Hoping to alleviate a persistent health problem, she moved to San Francisco, California, in 1872, where she met Charles Lake Cramer, a photographer; they wed that year. Despite the move, health problems continued to plague her.

In 1885, perhaps under the impetus of Christian Scientist Miranda Rice, Cramer had what she described as a divine revelation after an "hour of earnest meditation and prayerful seeking" and a “realization of the oneness of Life, [and] a gleam of its Truth flashed across my mental vision.” She reported being healed of her health problems within the following two years.

== Divine Science ==
In 1887, she began to practice faith-healing herself. In October 1888, Cramer inaugurated Harmony, a monthly journal. In May 1888, she and her husband opened what would become the Home College of Divine Science. The term "Divine Science" was not coined by Cramer, but had been used earlier by Mary Baker Eddy, founder of Christian Science, as well as by Wilberforce Juvenal Colville, who had published a book by that title that year.

In 1892, Cramer founded the International Divine Science Association, a forerunner of the International New Thought Alliance which would interconnect the various New Thought centers. In 1893, she helped open the second Divine Science College in Oakland and undertook several cross-country missionary trips.

Between 1893 and 1898, Cramer trained Nona L. Brooks, ordaining her as a minister in the Church of Divine Science on December 1, 1898. Brooks returned to Denver with sisters Fannie Brooks James and Alethea Brooks Small, forming a church there that would eventually become the home church of the denomination.

Cramer died August 2, 1906, in San Francisco, due to a recurrence of her tuberculosis as a result of the aftermath of the great San Francisco earthquake.

== Published work ==
- Cramer, Malinda (1890). Lessons in the science of infinite spirit : and the Christ method of healing. C.W. Gordon.
- Cramer, Malinda (1893). Basic statements and health treatment of truth. San Francisco: C.W. Gordon.
- Cramer, Malinda (1905). Basic statements and health treatment of truth; a system of instruction in divine science and its application in healing and for class training, home and private use. San Francisco: Home College of Divine Science.
- Cramer, Malinda (1907). Divine science and healing. C.L. Cramer.
- Malinda Cramer's Hidden Harmony, Joan Cline-McCrary, ed., Divine Science Federation International (Denver), 1990
