= New Thought =

19th-century American spiritual movement

The New Thought movement (also Higher Thought) is a new religious movement that coalesced in the United States in the early 19th century. New Thought was seen by its adherents as succeeding "ancient thought", accumulated wisdom and philosophy from a variety of origins, such as Ancient Greek, Roman, Egyptian, Chinese, Taoist, Hindu, and Buddhist cultures and their related belief systems, primarily regarding the interaction among thought, belief, consciousness in the human mind, and the effects of these within and beyond the human mind. Though no direct line of transmission is traceable, many adherents to New Thought in the 19th and 20th centuries claimed to be direct descendants of those systems.

Although there have been many leaders and various offshoots of the New Thought philosophy, the origins of New Thought have often been traced back to Phineas Quimby, or even as far back as Franz Mesmer, who was one of the first European thinkers to link one's mental state to physical condition. Many of these groups are incorporated into the International New Thought Alliance. The contemporary New Thought movement is a loosely allied group of religious denominations, authors, philosophers, and individuals who share a set of beliefs concerning metaphysics, positive thinking, the law of attraction, healing, life force, creative visualization, and personal power.

New Thought holds that Infinite Intelligence, or God, is everywhere, spirit is the totality of real things, true human selfhood is divine, divine thought is a force for good, sickness originates in the mind, and "right thinking" has a healing effect. Although New Thought is neither monolithic nor doctrinaire, in general, modern-day adherents of New Thought share some core beliefs:

1. God or Infinite Intelligence is "supreme, universal, and everlasting";
2. divinity dwells within each person, that all people are spiritual beings;
3. "the highest spiritual principle [is] loving one another unconditionally... and teaching and healing one another"; and
4. "our mental states are carried forward into manifestation and become our experience in daily living".

William James used the term "New Thought" as synonymous with the "Mind cure movement", in which he included many sects with diverse origins, such as idealism and Hinduism.

== Overview ==
William James, in The Varieties of Religious Experience (1902), described New Thought:

[F]or the sake of having a brief designation, I will give the title of the "Mind-cure movement." There are various sects of this "New Thought," to use another of the names by which it calls itself; but their agreements are so profound that their differences may be neglected for my present purpose, and I will treat the movement, without apology, as if it were a simple thing.

It is an optimistic scheme of life, with both a speculative and a practical side. In its gradual development during the last quarter of a century, it has taken up into itself a number of contributory elements, and it must now be reckoned with as a genuine religious power. It has reached the stage, for example, when the demand for its literature is great enough for insincere stuff, mechanically produced for the market, to be to a certain extent supplied by publishers – a phenomenon never observed, I imagine, until a religion has got well past its earliest insecure beginnings.

One of the doctrinal sources of Mind-cure is the four Gospels; another is Emersonianism or New England transcendentalism; another is Berkeleyan idealism; another is spiritism, with its messages of "law" and "progress" and "development"; another the optimistic popular science evolutionism of which I have recently spoken; and, finally, Hinduism has contributed a strain. But the most characteristic feature of the mind-cure movement is an inspiration much more direct. The leaders in this faith have had an intuitive belief in the all-saving power of healthy-minded attitudes as such, in the conquering efficacy of courage, hope, and trust, and a correlative contempt for doubt, fear, worry, and all nervously precautionary states of mind. Their belief has in a general way been corroborated by the practical experience of their disciples; and this experience forms to-day a mass imposing in amount.

== History ==
=== Origins ===
The New Thought movement was based on the teachings of Phineas Quimby (1802–1866), an American mesmerist and healer. Quimby had developed a belief system that included the tenet that illness originated in the mind as a consequence of erroneous beliefs and that a mind open to God's wisdom could overcome any illness. His basic premise was:

The trouble is in the mind, for the body is only the house for the mind to dwell in [...] Therefore, if your mind had been deceived by some invisible enemy into a belief, you have put it into the form of a disease, with or without your knowledge. By my theory or truth, I come in contact with your enemy, and restore you to health and happiness. This I do partly mentally, and partly by talking till I correct the wrong impression and establish the Truth, and the Truth is the cure.

During the late 19th century, the metaphysical healing practices of Quimby mingled with the "Mental Science" of Warren Felt Evans, a Swedenborgian minister. Mary Baker Eddy, the founder of Christian Science, has sometimes been cited as having used Quimby as inspiration for theology. Eddy was a patient of Quimby's and shared his view that disease is rooted in a mental cause. Because of its theism, Christian Science differs from the teachings of Quimby.

In the late 19th century, New Thought was propelled by a number of spiritual thinkers and philosophers and emerged through a variety of religious denominations and churches, particularly the Unity Church and Church of Divine Science (established in 1889 and 1888, respectively), followed by Religious Science (the Institute of Religious Science and Philosophy was established in 1927). Many of its early teachers and students were women; notable among the founders of the movement were Emma Curtis Hopkins, known as the "teacher of teachers", Myrtle Fillmore, Malinda Cramer, and Nona L. Brooks; with many of its churches and community centers led by women, from the 1880s to today.

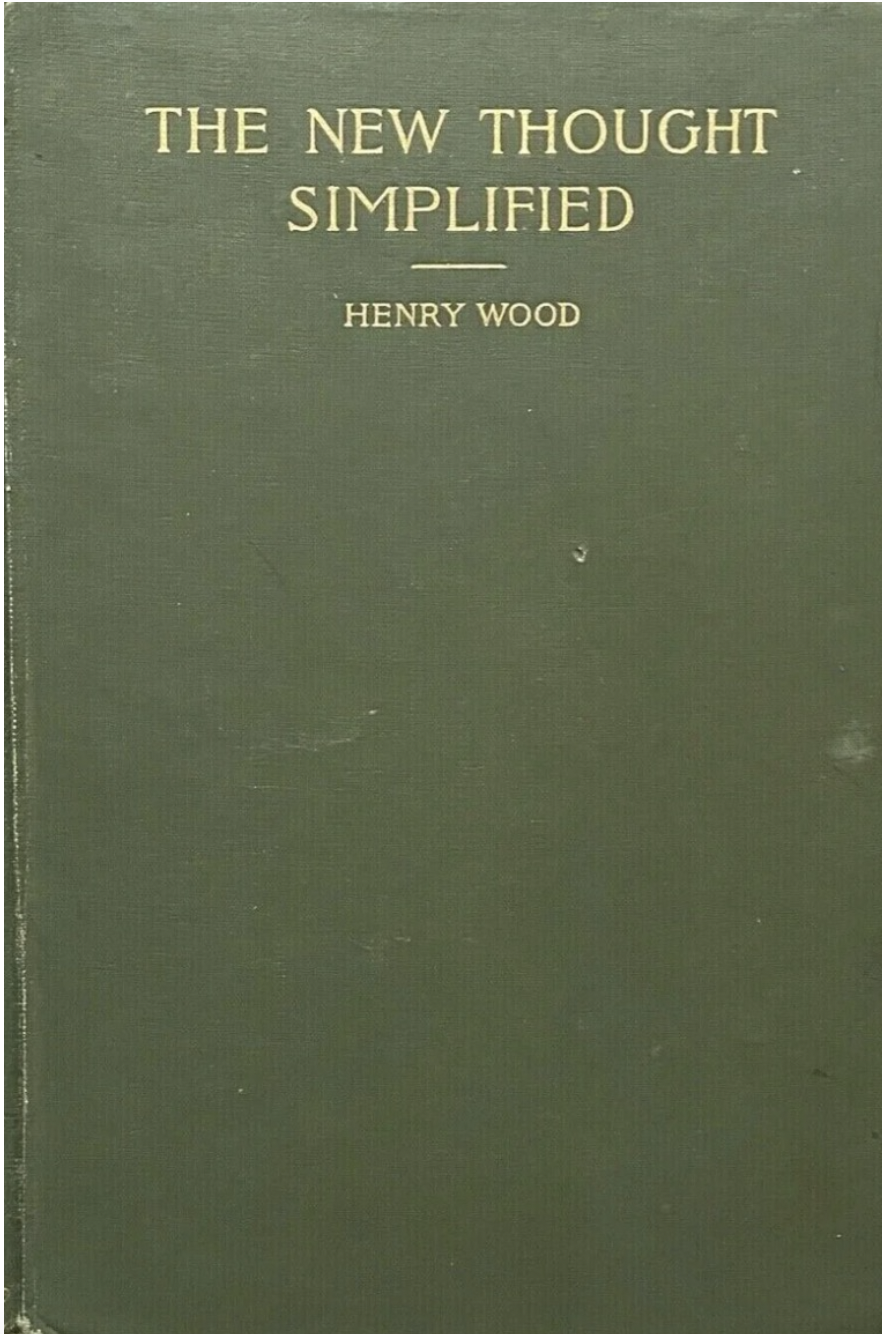
The New Thought Simplified, by Henry Wood

=== Growth ===
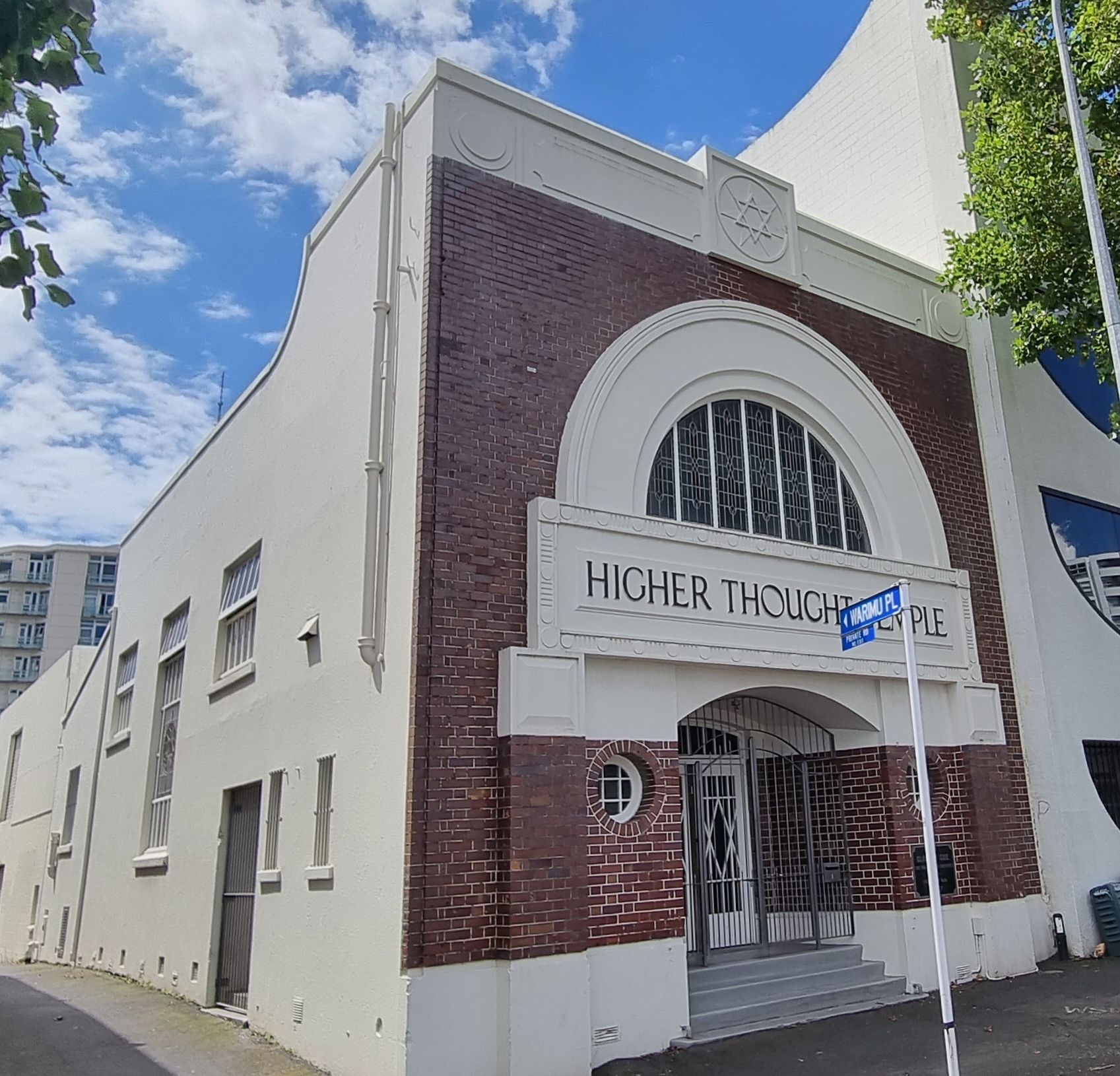
The historic Higher Thought Temple in Auckland, New Zealand

New Thought is also largely a movement of the printed word.

Prentice Mulford, through writing Your Forces and How to Use Them, a series of essays published during 1886–1892, was pivotal in the development of New Thought thinking, including the Law of Attraction.

In 1906, William Walker Atkinson (1862–1932) wrote and published Thought Vibration or the Law of Attraction in the Thought World. Atkinson was the editor of New Thought magazine and the author of more than 100 books on an assortment of religious, spiritual, and occult topics. The following year, Elizabeth Towne, the editor of The Nautilus, published Bruce MacLelland's book Prosperity Through Thought Force, in which he summarized the "Law of Attraction" as a New Thought principle, stating "You are what you think, not what you think you are."

These magazines were used to reach a large audience then, as others are now. Nautilus magazine, for example, had 45,000 subscribers and a total circulation of 150,000. One Unity Church magazine, Wee Wisdom, was the longest-lived children's magazine in the United States, published from 1893 until 1991. Today, New Thought magazines include Daily Word, published by Unity (Unity.org) and the Religious Science magazine; and Science of Mind, published by the Centers for Spiritual Living.

=== Major gatherings ===
The 1915 International New Thought Alliance (INTA) conference – held in conjunction with the Panama–Pacific International Exposition, a world's fair that took place in San Francisco – featured New Thought speakers from far and wide. The PPIE organizers were so favorably impressed by the INTA convention that they declared a special "New Thought Day" at the fair and struck a commemorative bronze medal for the occasion, which was presented to the INTA delegates, led by Annie Rix Militz. By 1916, the International New Thought Alliance had encompassed many smaller groups around the world, adopting a creed known as the "Declaration of Principles". The Alliance is held together by one central teaching: that people, through the constructive use of their minds, can attain freedom, power, health, prosperity, and all good, molding their bodies as well as the circumstances of their lives. The declaration was revised in 1957, with all references to Christianity removed, and a new statement based on the "inseparable oneness of God and Man".

== Beliefs ==
The chief tenets of New Thought are:

- Infinite Intelligence or God is omnipotent and omnipresent.
- Spirit is the ultimate reality.
- True human self-hood is divine.
- Divinely attuned thought is a positive force for good.
- All disease is mental in origin.
- Right thinking has a healing effect.

=== Evolution of thought ===
Adherents also generally believe that as humankind gains greater understanding of the world, New Thought itself will evolve to assimilate new knowledge. Alan Anderson and Deb Whitehouse have described New Thought as a "process" in which each individual and even the New Thought Movement itself is "new every moment". Thomas McFaul has claimed "continuous revelation", with new insights being received by individuals continuously over time. Jean Houston has spoken of the "possible human", or what we are capable of becoming.

=== Theological inclusionism ===
The Home of Truth has, from its inception as the Pacific Coast Metaphysical Bureau in the 1880s, under the leadership of Annie Rix Militz, disseminated the teachings of the Hindu teacher Swami Vivekananda. It is one of the more outspokenly interfaith of New Thought organizations, stating adherence to "the principle that Truth is Truth where ever it is found and who ever is sharing it". Joel S. Goldsmith's The Infinite Way incorporates teaching from Christian Science, as well.

=== Therapeutic ideas ===
Divine Science, Unity Church, and Religious Science are organizations that developed from the New Thought movement. Each teaches that Infinite Intelligence, or God, is the sole reality. New Thought adherents believe that sickness is the result of the failure to realize this truth. In this line of thinking, healing is accomplished by the affirmation of oneness with the Infinite Intelligence or God.

John Bovee Dods (1795–1862), an early practitioner of New Thought, wrote several books on the idea that disease originates in the electrical impulses of the nervous system and is therefore curable by a change of belief. Later New Thought teachers, such as the early-20th-century author, editor, and publisher William Walker Atkinson, accepted this premise. He connected his idea of mental states of being with his understanding of the new scientific discoveries in electromagnetism and neural processes.

=== Criticism ===
The New Thought movement has been criticized as a "get-rich-quick scheme" as much of its literature contains esoteric advice to make money.

== Movement ==
New Thought publishing and educational activities reach approximately 2.5 million people annually. The largest New Thought-oriented denomination is Seicho-No-Ie, which was founded by Masaharu Taniguchi in Japan. Other belief systems within the New Thought movement include Jewish Science, Religious Science/Centers for Spiritual Living and Unity. Past denominations have included Psychiana and Father Divine.

Religious Science operates under three main organizations: the Centers for Spiritual Living; the Affiliated New Thought Network; and Global Religious Science Ministries. Ernest Holmes, the founder of Religious Science, stated that Religious Science is not based on any "authority" of established beliefs, but rather on "what it can accomplish" for the people who practice it. The Science of Mind, authored by Ernest Holmes, while based on a philosophy of being "open at the top", focuses extensively on the teachings of Jesus Christ. Unity, founded by Charles and Myrtle Fillmore, identifies itself as "Christian New Thought", focused on "Christian idealism", with the Bible as one of its main texts, although not interpreted literally. The other core text is Lessons in Truth by H. Emilie Cady. The Universal Foundation for Better Living, or UFBL, was founded in 1974 by Johnnie Colemon in Chicago, Illinois, after breaking away from the Unity Church for "blatant racism".

== See also ==
- Idealism – Philosophical position
- Jewish Science – Judaic spiritual movement
- List of New Thought writers
- New religious movements – Religious community or spiritual group of modern origin
- Panentheism – Belief that the divine pervades all of space and time and also extends beyond it
- Prosperity theology – Material wealth-based Protestant belief
- The Secret: 2006 film and book
- Theosophy – Religion established in the United States
- Universalism – Concept that some ideas have universal applicability

== General bibliography ==
- Albanese, Catherine (2007), A Republic of Mind and Spirit: A Cultural History of American Metaphysical Religion, Yale University Press.
- Albanese, Catherine (2016), The Spiritual Journals of Warren Felt Evans: From Methodism to Mind Cure, Indiana University Press.
- Anderson, Alan and Deb Whitehouse. New Thought: A Practical American Spirituality. 2003.
- Braden, Charles S. Spirits in Rebellion: The Rise and Development of New Thought, Southern Methodist University Press, 1963.
- Harley, Gail M. (2002). Emma Curtis Hopkins: Forgotten Founder of New Thought. Syracuse University Press. ISBN 0-8156-2933-8. OCLC 606778962.
- Judah, J. Stillson. The History and Philosophy of the Metaphysical Movements in America. Philadelphia: The Westminster Press. 1967. Review by Neil Duddy.
- McFaul, Thomas R (September–October 2006), "Religion in the Future Global Civilization", The Futurist.
- Melton, J. Gordon (2009). Melton's Encyclopedia of American Religions (8th ed.). Detroit: Gale Cengage Learning. ISBN 978-0-7876-9696-2.
- Michell, Deidre (2002). "New Thinking, New Thought, New Age: The Theology and Influence of Emma Curtis Hopkins (1849-1925)". Counterpoints: The Flinders University Online Journal of Interdisciplinary Conference Papers. 2 (1): 6–18.
- Mosley, Glenn R (2006), New Thought, Ancient Wisdom: The History and Future of the New Thought Movement, Templeton Foundation Press, ISBN 1-59947-089-6
- Satter, Beryl (1999). Each mind a kingdom: American women, sexual purity, and the New Thought movement, 1875-1920. Berkeley: University of California Press. ISBN 978-0-520-21765-2.
- Voorhees, Amy B. (2021). A New Christian Identity: Christian Science Origins and Experience in American Culture. Chapel Hill: The University of North Carolina Press. ISBN 9781469662350.
- White, Ronald M (1980), "Abstract", New Thought Influences on Father Divine (Masters Thesis), Oxford, OH: Miami University.
