= International New Thought Alliance =

Umbrella organization

The International New Thought Alliance (INTA) is an umbrella organization for New Thought adherents "dedicated to serving the New Thought Movement’s various branches, organizations and individuals".

== History ==
The antecedents of the International New Thought Alliance date back to the 1899 New England convention of the Metaphysical Club, one of the first New Thought organizations, formed in Boston, Massachusetts in 1895 by, among others, L. B. Macdonald, J. W. Lindy, and Frederick Reed. The first public lecture sponsored by the club was an address by Julia Ward Howe. This convention led to the founding of the International Metaphysical League the following year. This League held the "International New Thought Convention" in Chicago in 1903, which was followed by similar conventions in 1906 and 1907. In 1908, the organization was renamed the "National New Thought Alliance". This organization held national conventions annually through 1914. The first international convention, held in London, England 21–26 June 1914, saw the renaming and re-organizing of the National New Thought Alliance into the International New Thought Alliance. The New Thought Bulletin was the newsletter for the organization.

The Panama–Pacific International Exposition held a New Thought Day on 28 August 1915. The following day opened the First International New Thought Congress, held until 5 September. The first International New Thought Alliance Annual World Congress was held here, with a variety of New Thought luminaries leading the organization, such as James A. Edgerton, Annie Rix Militz, Thomas Troward, and many others. Throughout its history, other New Thought notables such as William Walker Atkinson, Clara Bewick Colby, Florence Crawford, Horatio W. Dresser, George Wharton James, Edgar L. Larkin, Orison Swett Marden, and Elizabeth Towne were involved in the INTA.

The organization continues to conduct its Annual World Congress, publishes New Thought magazine, and asserts that it houses the largest New Thought Archives known.

=== Past presidents ===
- Annie Rix Militz
- Charles Brodie Patterson
- Emma Curtis Hopkins
- Horatio Dresser
- W.W. Atkinson

== See also ==
- Association for Global New Thought
- List of New Thought denominations and independent centers

== Sources ==
=== Bibliography ===
- Dresser, Horatio (1919). A History of the New Thought Movement. Thomas Y. Crowell.
- Anderson, C. Alan; Whitehouse, Deborah G. (2003). New Thought: A Practical American Spirituality. 1st Books. ISBN 1-4107-0172-7.
- Harley, Gail M. (2002). Emma Curtis Hopkins: Forgotten Founder of New Thought. Syracuse University Press. ISBN 0-8156-2933-8. OCLC 606778962.
- Miller, Timothy (1995). America's Alternative Religions. State University of New York Press. ISBN 978-0-7914-2397-4.
- Satter, Beryl (2001). Each Mind a Kingdom: American Women, Sexual Purity, and the New Thought Movement, 1875-1920. University of California Press. ISBN 978-0-520-22927-3.
