= Paddock (disambiguation) =

A paddock is an enclosure for horses.

Paddock may also refer to:

== Places ==
- Paddock, Huddersfield, suburb in West Yorkshire, England
- Paddock, Nebraska (disambiguation), two unincorporated communities
  - Paddock, Holt County, Nebraska
  - Paddock, Merrick County, Nebraska
- Paddock, South Africa, a rural community in KwaZulu-Natal, South Africa
- Paddock, Walsall, West Midlands, England
- Paddock (war rooms), a two-level concrete citadel in Dollis Hill, north London, serving as war rooms for Winston Churchill during World War II
- Paddock Building, a historic commercial building in Malone, Franklin County, New York
- Paddock Centre, a unit of Broadmoor Hospital
- Paddock Farm, a historic farmstead in Holden, Massachusetts, United States
- Paddock Mall, an enclosed shopping mall in Ocala, Florida
- Paddock Mansion, historic home located at Watertown in Jefferson County, New York
- Paddock Township (disambiguation)
- Paddock Wood, village in Kent, England
- The Paddocks, a farmhouse in London listed with Historic England

== People ==
- Paddock (surname), a surname

== Other uses ==
- Paddock (field), a type of agricultural field
- Paddock, the enclosed area where vehicles are paraded before a motorsport event
- Paddock, the enclosed area at a race track where horses are paraded and mounted before a race, and unsaddled after a race
- Paddock, a toad
- Paddock Shops, a shopping center in Louisville, Kentucky

== See also ==
- The Paddock (disambiguation)
