= The Unforgiven (1960 film) =

1960 film

- Theatrical release poster
- Directed by: John Huston
- Screenplay by: Ben Maddow; David Wolff
- Based on: The Unforgiven; 1957 novel by Alan Le May
- Produced by: James Hill
- Starring: Burt Lancaster; Audrey Hepburn; Audie Murphy; John Saxon; Charles Bickford; Lillian Gish; Albert Salmi; Joseph Wiseman; June Walker
- Cinematography: Franz Planer
- Edited by: Russell Lloyd
- Music by: Dimitri Tiomkin
- Color process: Technicolor
- Production companies: Hecht-Hill-Lancaster Productions; James Productions
- Distributed by: United Artists
- Release date: April 6, 1960
- Running time: 125 minutes 121 minutes (Turner Library print)
- Country: United States
- Language: English
- Budget: $5 million
- Box office: $3,200,000 (rentals)

The Unforgiven is a 1960 American Western film directed by John Huston, and starring Burt Lancaster and Audrey Hepburn. Filmed in Durango, Mexico, the supporting cast features Audie Murphy, Charles Bickford, Lillian Gish, John Saxon, Joseph Wiseman, Doug McClure, and Albert Salmi. The story is based on the novel The Unforgiven (1957) by Alan Le May. Uncommonly for its time, the film spotlights the issue of racism in the Old West against Native Americans and people who were believed to have Native American blood. The film is also known for the problems that occurred during production.

== Plot ==
The Zacharys are a thriving and respected family on the Texas frontier. Will Zachary was killed by Kiowa Indians, leaving his oldest son Ben as head of the family. Ben and his mother, Mattilda, are very protective of Rachel, who was adopted as an infant; she is doted on by the whole family, including her other brothers, Cash and Andy. The family is supported by their neighbor and Ben's business partner, Zeb Rawlins; Zeb's shy son Charlie wants to marry Rachel, which concerns Ben.

During preparations for a cattle drive to Wichita, Kansas, the family is unsettled by the appearance of Abe Kelsey, who claims that Rachel is Indian by birth. Believing this to be a lie, Ben and Cash engage in a gunfight with Kelsey, killing his horse. Kelsey then steals Rachel's beloved white stallion. Later, a group of Kiowa led by Lost Bird appears and offers Ben horses in exchange for handing over Rachel. Lost Bird claims that she is actually his sister, and that an old white man told him so.

Soon after, Charlie – , to whom Ben has decided to give permission to court Rachel – , is killed by the Kiowa. In her grief, Charlie's mother accuses Rachel of being a "dirty Injun." Ben leads the ranchers in tracking down Kelsey, and they bring him back to the Rawlins ranch to hang him as a horse thief.

With a noose around his neck, Kelsey tells the gathered ranchers that on a retaliatory raid against the Kiowa that he led with Will Zachary, he found a baby girl and was about to kill her when Will intervened and took the baby as his own. Kelsey claims that his own son was captured by the Kiowa and ransomed for Rachel's return, but Will refused. Ben intervenes and tells the gathered group the story he knows: that Kelsey's son was actually killed in the fighting, and that Kelsey invented the story and followed them from town to town, poisoning people's minds wherever they moved.

Mattilda, driven to the edge by Kelsey's accusations, strikes the horse on which Kelsey is seated, so it runs out from under him, hanging him. Despite protests that Kelsey was insane, her actions convince Zeb that she was telling the truth, and he tells Ben to give Rachel to the Kiowa, or their partnership will be broken. Ben refuses, and all of the ranchers turn their backs on the Zacharys.

Back at their homestead, Mattilda admits to her family that Will took the Kiowa baby and brought her home to replace an infant daughter they had just lost. Cash, unable to accept an Indian as his sister, abandons the family and spends the night with Georgia Rawlins. The Kiowa return to the Zachary ranch in force, demanding Rachel, who tries to save her family by going over to the Kiowa. To stop her, Ben deliberately breaks the truce by ordering Andy to kill a Kiowa, which touches off a bloody siege. Facing down death, Ben expresses a desire to marry Rachel should they survive. During a break in the fighting, the Kiowa camped nearby play music on their pipes and drums, and the Zacharys play a Mozart composition on their piano. However, Kiowa riders attack and destroy the piano, resuming the fight.

When the Kiowa stampede cattle over the roof of the house, the family sets it on fire and takes shelter in the root cellar. Mattilda, who had been shot earlier, succumbs to her wounds and dies. Almost out of ammunition, Ben embraces Andy and Rachel, and Rachel and he passionately kiss. Just as the family is about to be overwhelmed, a penitent Cash returns and begins fighting the attacking Kiowa warriors. Ben joins him shortly thereafter, and together they turn the tide by fighting off the remaining Kiowa. Rachel, protecting a wounded Andy, is confronted by Lost Bird, who enters the house. After a tense moment, she shoots and kills him. With the rest of the tribe gone, Rachel and her brothers exit the house together and watch a flock of geese fly through the sky.

== Cast ==
- Burt Lancaster as Ben Zachary
- Audrey Hepburn as Rachel Zachary
- Audie Murphy as Cash Zachary
- John Saxon as Johnny Portugal
- Charles Bickford as Zeb Rawlins
- Lillian Gish as Mattilda Zachary
- Albert Salmi as Charlie Rawlins
- Joseph Wiseman as Abe Kelsey
- June Walker as Hagar Rawlins
- Kipp Hamilton as Georgia Rawlins
- Arnold Merritt as Jude Rawlins
- Doug McClure as Andy Zachary
- Carlos Rivas as Lost Bird

== Production ==
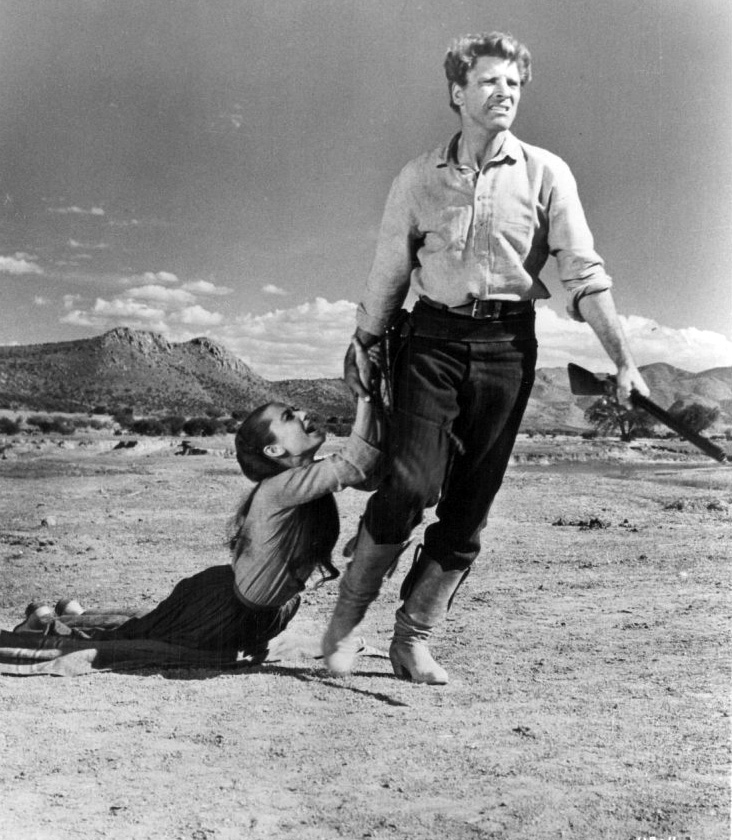
Publicity photo of Lancaster and Hepburn during filming

The Unforgiven was the final Hecht-Hill-Lancaster (HHL) production. It had a projected budget of $3 million, which was later increased to $5.5 million. Original screenwriter JP Miller was replaced by Ben Maddow, original director Delbert Mann was replaced by John Huston, and plans for Richard Burton to play Cash Zachary were stopped when Burton demanded equal billing with Burt Lancaster, which Lancaster refused. The role then went to Audie Murphy.

Production was suspended for several months in 1959 after Audrey Hepburn broke her back when she fell off a horse while rehearsing a scene. Although she eventually recovered, the accident was blamed for a subsequent miscarriage that Hepburn suffered. According to several published biographies of Hepburn, she blamed herself for the accident and all but disowned the film, although she did complete it when she was well enough to return to work. Hepburn stepped away from acting the next year to give birth to Sean Hepburn Ferrer, returning to the screen with Breakfast at Tiffany's (1961).

Huston battled with HHL, the production company financing the film, because HHL wanted a more commercial and less controversial film, while Huston wanted to make a statement about racism in America. The result was that neither side received exactly what it had wanted. Huston's cinematographer of choice, Oswald Morris, was unavailable, causing Huston to not talk to Morris for several years. John Saxon had signed a three-picture deal with HHL. Scenes featuring Saxon's character Johnny Portugal were deleted without the director's consent.

The name "Lost Bird" is applied by some Plains Indian tribes to native children adopted by whites. It was popularized by Zintkála Nuni, a Hunkpapa Lakotah survivor of the Wounded Knee Massacre, taken by Leonard Wright Colby and raised by his wife Clara Bewick Colby, whose widely circulated feminist newspaper The Woman's Tribune carried a column on Nuni for many years. The Lost Bird Society helps to reunite these adopted children with their birth families.

== Reception ==
In 1968, Stanley Kauffmann of The New Republic described the film as "ludicrous". Bosley Crowther, in his review for The New York Times, stated that Huston "who made a "different" Western in his The Treasure of Sierra Madre [sic], has obviously tried to make another in The Unforgiven," and "the gritty aspect of the ranching frontier, the tough, robust nature of its people, the touchiness of the mystery are all well and tensely brought together within Mr. Huston's crunching scenes," but that "Those who expect to see a settlement of the racial question will not be satisfied."

== See also ==
- 1960 in film
- List of American films of 1960
- List of Western films
