= The Paddock =

The Paddock may refer to:

- The Paddock and the Mouse, a 15th century poem by Robert Henryson
- The Paddock Club, a former nightclub in Greenville, North Carolina
- Paddock Arcade, a historic 19th century shopping mall in Watertown, New York
- The Paddocks, a historic grade II* listed farmhouse in Crews Hill, Enfield, London
- Party in the Paddock, an annual 3 day music festival held in Carrick, Tasmania, Australia
- Picks From The Paddock, a British horse racing editorial organisation

== See also ==
- Paddock (disambiguation)
