= The Shrubbery =

The Shrubbery can refer to:

- The Shrubbery, Kidderminster, a historic former military site in Kidderminster, Worcestershire.
- The Shrubbery (Paddock), Chatham town park, originally “The Shrubbery.”
- The Shrubbery School, a private primary school in Walmley, founded in 1930.
- Jesson’s Church of England Primary School, a mixed 3–11 voluntary aided Dudley school on the former 19th‑century “Shrubbery” site.
- 72 Woodstock Road (“The Shrubbery”) — St Hugh’s WWII USO club; from 1946 the Maison française d’Oxford.
