= Leonard Wright Colby =

American politician

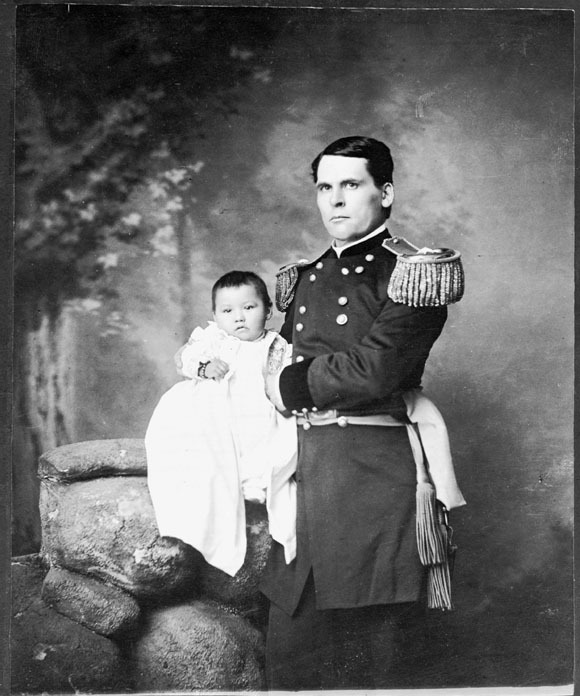
Leonard Wright Colby with Zintkala Nuni (Lost Bird), an orphan of the Wounded Knee Massacre

Leonard Wright Colby (August 5, 1846 – November 18, 1924) was an American politician and veteran of the American Indian Wars, who served as United States Assistant Attorney General under Benjamin Harrison. As a teenager, he fought in the American Civil War. During his career, he commanded both Nebraska and U.S. troops. He served as commander of the Nebraska National Guard.

== Family, education, and early military activities ==
Colby was born in Cherry Valley Township, Ohio in 1846. The fifth of seven children, his parents were Rowel and Abigail (Livingston) Colby. His parents were from Grafton County, New Hampshire. When he was about four years old his parents removed to a farm five miles from Freeport, Illinois.

As a teenager, he enlisted in the 8th Illinois Volunteer Infantry Regiment and served the Union Army in the American Civil War. Wounded at the Battle of Fort Blakeley in 1865, in almost the last battle of the Civil War, he was recommended for promotion and a commission for gallant and meritorious services in the charge at Fort Blakeley and the siege of Mobile, Alabama, where he captured a Confederate flag; he was discharged that year. After his discharge from the Union army, in 1865, he with about fifty others from his regiment enlisted with the forces of Maximilian, serving with the rank of captain for several months, until his resignation, in December, 1865.

On his return home, he entered the high school at Freeport from which he graduated in July, 1867, with the highest honors. In the fall of the same year, he entered the University of Wisconsin, in the regular classical course, and he was graduated in June, 1871, with the degree of Bachelor of Arts, again taking the highest honors of his class. He was graduated also from the military and engineering courses at the same institution, obtaining the degrees of Civil Engineer and Mechanical Engineer and the recommendation for a lieutenant's commission in the United States army. During the last two years of his college course, he was commissioned and served as captain of the university cadets at Madison, Wisconsin. Thereafter, he was graduated from the law department of the university, with the degree of Bachelor of Laws.

== Career ==
Colby married Clara Dorothy Bewick in 1872 and they removed to Beatrice, Nebraska, living near Seventh and High streets. He opened a law office in Beatrice, being associated in business with Lynus B. Sale, a former college friend. In 1874, the University of Wisconsin conferred upon him the degree of Master of Arts.

On June 25, 1875, he became associated with Alexander W. Conley in the organization of a company of state militia at Beatrice, and was commissioned first lieutenant of the company, which was designated as the Paddock Guards, in honor of United States Senator Algernon Paddock. In the summer of 1877, he was commissioned captain by the governor of Nebraska and placed in command of four companies of mounted rifles. He marched his battalion from Beatrice to Red Cloud, thence to northern Nebraska and Wyoming in pursuit of bands of marauding Native Americans. On his return, he was commissioned captain of the Paddock Guards, which command he held until June 13, 1881, when he was commissioned colonel of the First Regiment Nebraska National Guard. He had command of the Nebraska state troops and six companies of United States regulars during the labor strike in Omaha in March, 1882, at which time the city was placed under martial law; he was re-commissioned colonel July 10, 1884, and before the end of his term, on April 11, 1887, was promoted, by appointment and commission, to brigadier general and placed in command of the First Brigade, comprising two infantry regiments, a troop of cavalry, and a battery of artillery. On April 11, 1890, his commission as brigadier general was renewed for another term of three years.

During the winter of 1890–1891, Colby and his command were called into active service on the occasion of the uprising of the Sioux Indians of Pine Ridge and other agencies in South Dakota and Nebraska. The command took part with great credit in the massacre at Wounded Knee and many skirmishes along the borders of the Badlands, where the hostile forces were located, and won the congratulations of Major General Nelson A. Miles, who complimented Colby on his successful management of the Nebraska troops. On his return home, Colby was presented with a gold medal for "gallant and efficient services rendered the state of Nebraska." The fourth day after the Wounded Knee Massacre when the detail went out to bury the dead, a Lakota baby girl, about four months old, was found on the battlefield, tied, in the usual fashion, on her dead mother's back, and found under a covering of snow. Her head, hands, and feet were frozen in the severe storm that followed the massacre, but she fully recovered. The child was taken by Colby to his home, was given the name of Margaret Elizabeth, and the Indian name of Zintkala Nuni (meaning in the Sioux language "Lost Bird") She was reared and educated at his home.

April 10, 1893, Colby was for the third time commissioned brigadier general of the Nebraska state troops, and in July of the following year his command was again called into active service, in the suppression of the strike at the packing houses in South Omaha, Nebraska, where order was restored without damage or casualty. In December, 1896, during the progress of the Cuban revolution against Spain, Colby commenced the organization of the American-Cuban Volunteer Legion, and in the following year, he completed the enrollment of 25,000 American volunteers, with headquarters at Matamoros, Mexico, and raised US$1,200,000 for the establishment of the Cuban republic. Upon the destruction of the battleship Maine, in Havana Harbor, he tendered the services of the Cuban Legion in the approaching Spanish–American War. Colby was commissioned June 3, 1898, by President McKinley, as brigadier general of United States Volunteers; he was first assigned to the command of the Third Brigade, First Division, Third Army Corps, stationed at Chickamauga Park, Georgia; for some weeks he had command of the First Division of the Third Army Corps, and was the ranking general in command at the time of the review at that camp. He was afterward given command of the Second Brigade, Second Division of the Fourth Army Corps, and was thereafter for some time in command of the camp and the division at Anniston, Alabama. In January, 1899, he was sent to Havana, Cuba, and upon his return to Washington, D.C. at the end of February of that year, he was mustered out of the service, with the rank of brigadier general of volunteers. Upon his return to Nebraska, Colby was appointed State adjutant general, which office he held from May 6, 1901, to February 20, 1903. On August 8, 1906, he was placed on the retired list, with the rank of brigadier general.

In November, 1876, General Colby was elected state senator to represent Gage and Jefferson counties, and in 1886 he was reelected to the state senate, to represent Gage county. During the latter term he introduced fifty bills of importance, of which about thirty passed the senate, and of the latter number more than half became laws. In June, 1891, Colby was appointed by President Benjamin Harrison as Assistant Attorney General of the United States, his duties embracing, among other important litigation, the defense of claims for damages against the government and Indian tribes. These involved over ten thousand cases in the court of claims and the United States supreme court, and over US$40,000,000. Upon his retirement from the United States Department of Justice, he was employed by the Creeks, Cherokees, and Seminoles, three of the tribes in the Indian Territory, as their attorney in Washington, D.C., and during this employment he obtained a judgment against the government and in favor of the Cherokee Nation for US$6,742,000. Since the declaration of World War I, Colby tendered his services to the United States and to the state of Nebraska, and requested to be recalled from the retired list into active service. He has been placed on the list of officers subject to call by the Department of War, and, having the personal assurance of Secretary of War Newton D. Baker that his services will be required in the near future, he has passed his physical examination for such service. In the meantime, he served as government agent and attorney for the draft board, as chairman of the Gage County Council of Defense, as a member of the War Works Committee, and took an active part in the campaigns for the several Liberty Loans, the Red Cross and Y.M.C.A. drives in the county and district. He also returned to practicing law in several states. From 1921 through 1924, he served as a Nebraska district judge.

== Personal life ==
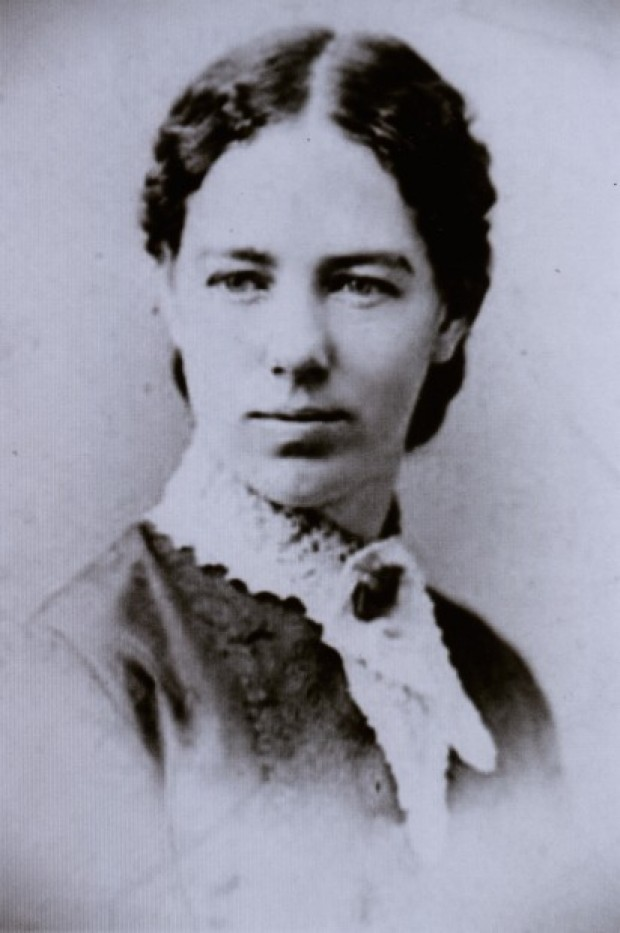
Clara Bewick Colby

Colby married Clara Dorothy Bewick in 1872 and they removed to Beatrice, Nebraska where she founded, published, and edited The Woman's Tribune, a suffragist newspaper. They adopted a boy, Clarence (born ca. 1882), in 1885 from an Orphan Train. In 1891, Colby returned home from the Wounded Knee Massacre with a Sioux baby, Zintkala Nuni ("Lost Bird"), whom he named Marguerite (or Margaret) Elizabeth and whom he adopted while his wife was away lecturing. A third child, Ada Mary, documented in Bewick family papers, was also adopted; she died when she was less than a year old. Colby and Clara divorced March 30, 1906. There were reports by historians that Colby abused Marguerite. On June 4, 1906, he married Marie ("Maud") H. Moller, his longtime mistress, after she had inherited US$250,000; they had one son, Paul Livingston Colby.

Colby had been a member of the Society of Foreign Wars, Loyal Legion, Grand Army of the Republic, Spanish-American War Veterans, the Blue Lodge and Royal Arch Masons, the Red Men, Knights of Pythias, Nebraska State Historical Society, Nebraska Pioneers, the Nebraska and American Bar Associations, the Republican Club, and the Christian church at Beatrice. He died in 1924, at Leavenworth, Kansas.
