= Cornelia Paddock =

Member of the anti-polygamist movement in the United States (1840-1898)

Cornelia Paddock (1840–1898, aged 57) was a leader of the anti-polygamy movement in Utah. She was a founding member of the Utah Ladies' Anti-Polygamy Society.

== Life ==
Paddock was born in New York City in 1840 and moved to the Utah Territory with her husband Alonzo in 1870, at which point she became involved in political movements that opposed plural marriage.

=== Involvement in the anti-polygamist movement ===
In 1878, Paddock formed the Ladies Anti-Polygamy Society, along with Sarah Ann Cooke and Jennie Anderson Froseith.

Paddock's writing frequently appeared in the Anti-Polygamy Standard from 1880 to 1883. She also published two novels with anti-Mormon themes, titled The Fate of Madame La Tour and In the Toils; or, Martyrs of the Latter Days (1879).

In 1884, Paddock signed a petition against women's suffrage, in conjunction with Angie Newman and the Women's Christian Temperance Union.

Some historians theorize that Paddock may have influenced the strict anti-polygamist policies of Nebraska politician Algernon Paddock, who was her husband's cousin.

=== Woman's Home Association ===
In October 1894, she was elected president of the Woman's Home Association of Salt Lake City (WHA), an organization formed with the mission of providing employment training for sex workers. The WHA was disbanded in 1901, three years after Paddock's death. In 1884, Paddock signed a petition against women's suffrage, in conjunction with Angie Newman and the Women's Christian Temperance Union.
