= Picks From The Paddock =

British horse racing media company

- Type(s): Journalism / Editorial
- Founder(s): Rory K Paddock
- Founded: May 2012
- Language: English
- Headquarters: Derbyshire, England, United Kingdom
- Website: www.picksfromthepaddock.co.uk

Picks From The Paddock is a British horse racing editorial organisation that produces print and multimedia content for various news and media outlets.

== History ==
The company launched as a blog on 4 May 2012, with the first published content previewing the 2012 2000 Guineas from Newmarket. In its infancy the company was just the personal blog of Managing Director Rory K Paddock before receiving advertising investment from OLBG.com. This prompted the company to expand and take a more professional direction. In 2014 Picks From The Paddock produced its first written content for an in-print news outlet. They agreed to produce daily horse racing previews for The Lancashire Evening Post. Since their first partnership with the Lancashire Evening Post the company has produced content for more than 20 different media outlets both regionally, nationally and internationally, Away from the companies work with various publications Picks From The Paddock continuously produced horse racing previews, news and feature content via their own online platform at PicksfromthePaddock.co.uk and their recently launched mobile phone app (Launched March 2023) In early 2025 the company took the bold step to rebrand the organisation to Racing-Daily.com in order to grow the company further.

== Editorial content ==
=== Lancashire Evening Post ===
In July 2014, Picks From The Paddock partnered with the Lancashire Evening Post to provide daily horse racing content. The content included three race previews a day for each weekday and a preview of every live race broadcast on Channel 4 Racing on a Saturday.

=== West Yorkshire Press ===
In September 2014, various West Yorkshire based newspapers within the Johnston Press Group published the companies preview of Doncaster's St Leger meeting. The team tipped eventual winner Kingston Hill to win the St Leger. Their work appeared in the following newspapers:

- Wakefield Express
- Dewsbury Reporter
- Spenborough Guardian
- Batley News
- Morley Observer
- Mirfield Reporter

=== The Herald (Scotland) ===
Between August 2016 and November 2017 The Herald worked with Picks From The Paddock to produce horse racing content six days a week. The content appeared both in-print and online.

=== The Sportsman / Betting Odds ===
The company collaborated with TheSportsman.com and Betting Odds in the build up to the 2019 Cheltenham Festival. Starting in January 2019 the partnership ran until the 2019 Grand National.

=== Race Bets ===
An agreement with the horse racing specific bookmaker Race Bets was the first time the company had provided content for a betting organisation. The two parties launched their partnership in conjunction with the start of the 2018 to 2019 National Hunt season. The editorial content provided was daily for every race in both the UK and Ireland. Further to the editorial content provided Race Bets became the companies exclusive betting partner.

=== Cambridge Evening News ===
The Cambridgeshire-based publication hired Picks From The Paddock to provide daily horse racing editorial content both in print and online six days a week. The partnership with the Cambridge Evening News started in April 2019.

=== Jersey Evening Post ===
Managing Director Rory K Paddock became the official horse racing pundit for the Jersey Evening Post in March 2019. As part of his agreement to take up the role the newspaper agreed to also promote Picks From The Paddock.

=== Archant Limited Publications ===
In April 2019 Picks From The Paddock signed an agreement to work with Archant Limited to provide content to three of their Suffolk and Norfolk based newspapers. The newspapers involved include:

- Ipswich Star
- Norwich Evening News
- East Anglian Daily Times

=== Racing Ahead Magazine ===
Monthly horse racing magazine Racing Ahead gave the company their own column titled "The Racing Notebook". The column focused on horses that had raced the previous month and were deemed likely to win in the near future. The column covered the 2018 flat racing and 2019 jumps racing schedule.

== Other ==
Through the companies work with The Herald, Cambridge Evening News, Jersey Evening Post and various Archant Limited publications writers from Picks From The Paddock were invited to contribute to the Racing Post NAP's table. The table is published daily both in-print and online and provides a list of horse racing tips from all UK and Irish daily newspapers.

The writers that currently feature in the Racing Post NAP's table (as of November 2021) also have their horse racing tips published on HorseRacing.net The five Picks From The Paddock that are included are:

- Rory K Paddock (Jersey Evening Post)
- Luke Tucker (Cambridge Evening News)
- Matt Polley (Ipswich Star)
- Dean Kilbryde (East Anglian Daily Times)
- Picks from the Paddock (picksfromthepaddock.co.uk)

Further to the above Picks From The Paddock also had a small stint producing content for the now defunct The Racing Paper which was formerly known as Racing Plus.

== The Turf Talk Podcast ==
From 2015 the company launched the first episode of their Turf Talk Podcast via their YouTube channel. In 2021 the podcast agreed to multi-platform distribution and is now available via Amazon Music, iTunes and Spotify. The show is broadcast weekly as a live video stream through their social media platforms Facebook and Twitter as well as on their YouTube channel.

== Published books ==
Since October 2015 the company has published a series of six-monthly 60 Horses To Follow books for both the UK and Irish National Hunt and flat horse racing season's. These books have been published both in-print and as e-books The books were distributed via various sales outlets including Amazon.
