= Milford Industrial Home =

Coordinates: 40.7721°N 97.0245°W

The Milford Industrial Home, formerly called Nebraska Maternity Home, was an institution in Milford, Nebraska, which housed unmarried pregnant women. For a while it was the only such institution in the country. It was founded by an act of the Nebraska Legislature in 1887, and the first woman was admitted in 1889. The women were under strict rules, and were encouraged to place their babies for adoption. They stayed there, usually under court order, for a period of a year. The home closed in 1954; it is estimated that over 4,000 babies were born there.

== History ==
=== Background and foundation ===
Frances Willard, later the founder of the Woman's Christian Temperance Union, had demanded of the Nebraska legislature that they provide a facility for unmarried women (to be unmarried and pregnant was a crime in Nebraska). The legislature responded in 1887 by establishing the Nebraska Maternity Home, for "homeless, penitent girls who have no specific disease". The building was finished in 1889, "on a 40-acre site east of Milford". It was run by "women's associate charities", and in 1897 it was placed under the control of the state. At that time five women were appointed to a board who would visit and examine the home. Salary distribution for the home showed it had a physician, a teacher, and a farmer/coachman on staff. For a while it was the only state-supported maternity home in the country.

=== 1889–1950 ===
The first woman entered in 1889. At the time it had two four-story dorms and a cattle barn, besides a boiler room and a water tower. A hospital building was built in 1931, three stories high. Between 1902 and 1904 the women at the facility were, on average, 19 years old, and gave birth to 15 children during those years; average occupancy was 29, for $109.21 per woman. Babies were encouraged to be placed for adoption, though by 1920 the law that established the home was adapted to state that mothers were encouraged to keep their children, and that women might also voluntarily seek admission to the home.

A 1904 report from the Nebraska Auditor of Public Accounts referred to the women as "inmates", and commented on the high per capita cost which it said "seems extravagant". A record from 1904 showed it had forty "inmates", "an average for the past year".

The women lived under strict rules, waking up at 5 AM and be at work by 6. Lights were out by 9 PM, and the superintendent read all incoming and outgoing mail. Those who broke the rules were placed in solitary confinement, and their babies cared for by nurses during their punishment. 84 women were admitted in 1950, and 70 babies were born that year, of whom 32 were given up for adoption.

=== Demise of the home ===
In 1951, one of Nebraska's state senators called these unwed mothers lawbreakers, and claimed the home was actually "an encouragement to break the law". Complaints over the finances reached the highest level of government, and in 1953 governor Robert B. Crosby wanted it closed; he said, "I do not think that Nebraska taxpayers are so affluent that they should indulge themselves in this exceptional activity." A minister from Milford, Rev. W.C. Iliff, protested: "From this (moral and religious) standpoint, we need to think of these girls as having souls. There is more value here than just money." Adding that she thought the home cost Nebraska taxpayers 3 cents each, she asked, "Aren't these girls worth the price of a 3-cent stamp?"

The legislature voted to close the home in 1953; it was argued that any unwed mothers could receive care in Omaha at the hospital of University of Nebraska Omaha, or at the Child Saving Institute. On June 23, 1953, the home closed for good. The total number of babies born at the institution is estimated over 4,000.

The dorms were torn down in 1994, and the site is occupied by a retirement home. Only the hospital remains, and is now used for storage.

== Zintkala Nuni ==
One notable person who was housed at Milford was Zintkala Nuni, a Native American woman who was found as a four-month-old baby after the Wounded Knee Massacre. At least once Nuni was placed in solitary confinement, in the school's attic. Nuni gave birth to a stillborn boy there, but had to stay there to serve out "the remainder of her sentence". Typically women were sentenced for a one-year term to the institution, but Nuni seems to have been placed there after her adoptive father, who may have gotten her pregnant, pulled political strings and got her committed in order to keep the matter private.
