= Paddock, Nebraska =

Paddock, Nebraska may refer to the unincorporated communities of:

- Paddock, Holt County, Nebraska
- Paddock, Merrick County, Nebraska, in Merrick County, Nebraska
