= Zintkála Nuni =

Survivor of the Wounded Knee Massacre

Ziŋtkála Núni
- "Lost Bird"
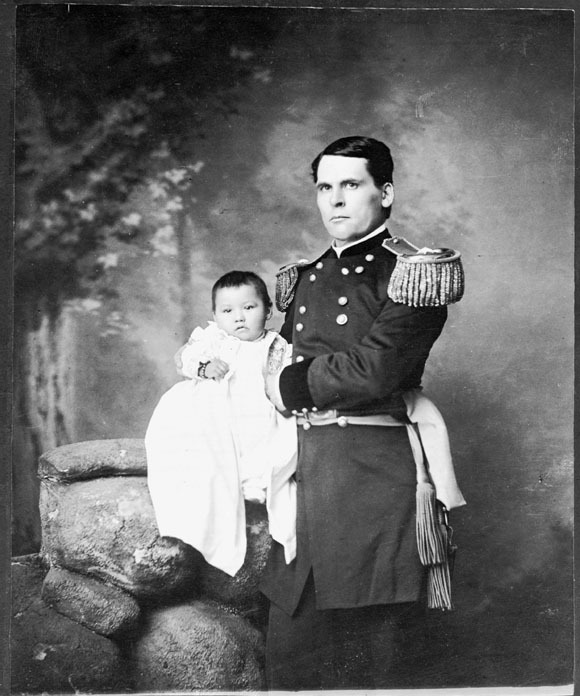
- Zintkála Nuni at 4 months old, held by her adoptive father, General Leonard Colby
- Born: Unknown; 1890; Pine Ridge Reservation, Wounded Knee, South Dakota
- Died: February 14, 1920 (aged 29–30); Hanford, California
- Resting place: Wounded Knee
- Other names: Margaret Elizabeth "Zintka" Colby; Zintka L. Colby "Lost Bird"; Maggie C. Nailor; Brings White Horse; Okicize Wanji Cinca
- Education: Haskell Indian School, Kansas; Chamberlain Indian School, Chamberlain, South Dakota; Milford Industrial Home, Nebraska
- Occupations: Actress; prostitute; Vaudeville performer
- Employer(s): Buffalo Bill Cody's Wild West Show and Sells-Floto Circus (1914-15), Pathe (1912)
- Spouses: Albert Chalivat, Robert "Bill" Keith, Dick Allen
- Children: Three. Only surviving: "Clyde" (born circa 1913).
- Parent(s): Unknown; adopted parents: Clara Colby and Leonard Colby

Zintkála Nuni (Lakota for "Lost Bird", 1890 – February 14, 1920), alternatively Zintka Lanuni, was a Lakota Sioux woman who was a 4-month-old infant when she was found alive among the victims at the Wounded Knee Massacre.

== Discovery and early life ==
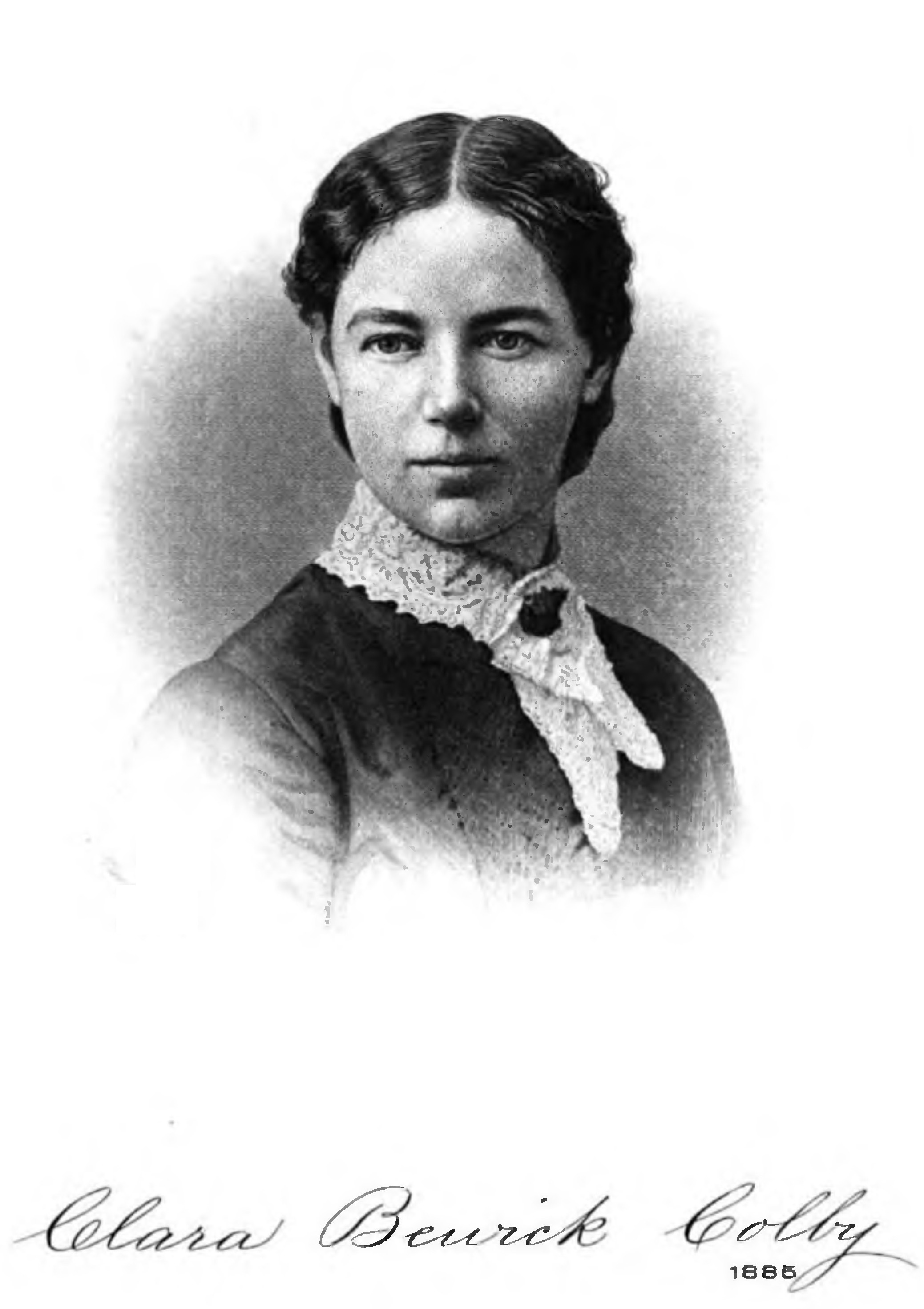
Nuni's adoptive mother, pictured circa 1885 in Democratic Ideals; A Memorial Sketch of Clara B. Colby, died in 1916

On the fourth day after the Wounded Knee massacre, when a US Army detail went out to bury the dead, Zintkála was found on the battlefield under a covering of snow, still tied and protected on her frozen mother's back. Although the exact member of the search party who found her is disputed, Charles Eastman and George E. Bartlett were among the physician team. She, along with five other babies, were taken to the nearby Pine Ridge Indian Reservation. Zintkála Nuni was found painted red, white, and blue by grease, used to protect the child against frostbite.

The baby was first cared for by members of the Lakota and she fully recovered from four days' exposure to freezing temperatures without food. Without knowledge of her identity or Lakota birth name, she was called Zintkála Nuni ("Lost Bird"). Zintkála Nuni received several other names within the first month of her discovery, including Maggie C. Nailor, Brings White Horse, Okicize Wanji Cinca, and Margaret Elizabeth Colby.

Bartlett took the child to Pine Ridge, where she was cared for by Native American resident Annie Yellow Bird. Buffalo Bill Cody, alongside press agent Major John Burke also took interest in the baby, arranging for her to be given to the Nailor family in Washington DC. The child was baptized Maggie C. Nailor in preparation to be adopted by Mrs. Allison Nailor, a wealthy business socialite friend of Buffalo Bill Cody.

In January 1891, the child gained the interest of General Leonard Wright Colby. When it was arranged that Colby should take custody of the child, Annie Yellow Bird took Zintkála Nuni to the nearby hostile Indian camp. Colby, intent on taking his 'prized relic', disguised himself as a half-blood Seneca Indian and rode into Red Cloud's camp to demand the child. Zintkála was then taken by Colby by train to his home in Beatrice, Nebraska as a relic or "curio" of the massacre. Zintkála Nuni's heritage was consistently disputed, a factor which promoted Colby's swift return to the east and adoption on January 19, 1891, naming her Margaret Elizabeth Colby, after a townswoman named 'Margaret' who had aided Colby in the child's abduction from Red Cloud's camp.

Colby said about his new daughter, "She is my relic of the Sioux War of 1891 and the Massacre of Wounded Knee." Upon his return to Beatrice, Colby held several large gathering to exhibit the child, receiving 2,000 visitors within 4 days. Zintkala was raised by Colby's wife, Clara Bewick Colby, who was a suffragette activist and publisher of The Woman's Tribune newspaper. Learning that a Lakota woman had said "Zintkála Nuni" [lost bird] when Colby took her away, Clara Colby called her "Zintka" instead of "Leonarda" as the Beatrice townsfolk used. Clara Colby and Lost Bird used the name 'Zintka Lanuni' in their correspondence.

When Zintkála was 5 years old, General Colby abandoned the family, married Zintkála's nanny and moved to Beatrice, Nebraska. According to her biographer, because she was raised by a privileged, white family yet was sent to segregated boarding schools for her education, Zintkála suffered through a childhood of prejudice and rejection by both relatives and classmates.

Due to Clara Colby's busy work life, Zintkála spent her school years at Native American boarding schools including Haskell in Kansas and Chamberlain in South Dakota. She also spent a brief period on a farm owned by the Pope family in Madison, Wisconsin. When Zintkala was 17 years old, Clara Colby decided Zintkála was too rebellious and sent her to live with her adoptive father. Soon after, Zintkala became pregnant. General Colby committed Zintkála to the Milford Industrial Home in Milford, Nebraska, a reformatory for unwed mothers, where her child was stillborn within the first month of her arrival. Zintkala remained there for a year, which was the usual commitment period for the institution.

Although the father of her child is unknown, historian Joseph Agonito suggested that Zintkála was sexually abused by Colby, and further speculated that Colby used his political influence to have her committed for a year to keep the abuse hidden.

== Occupation ==
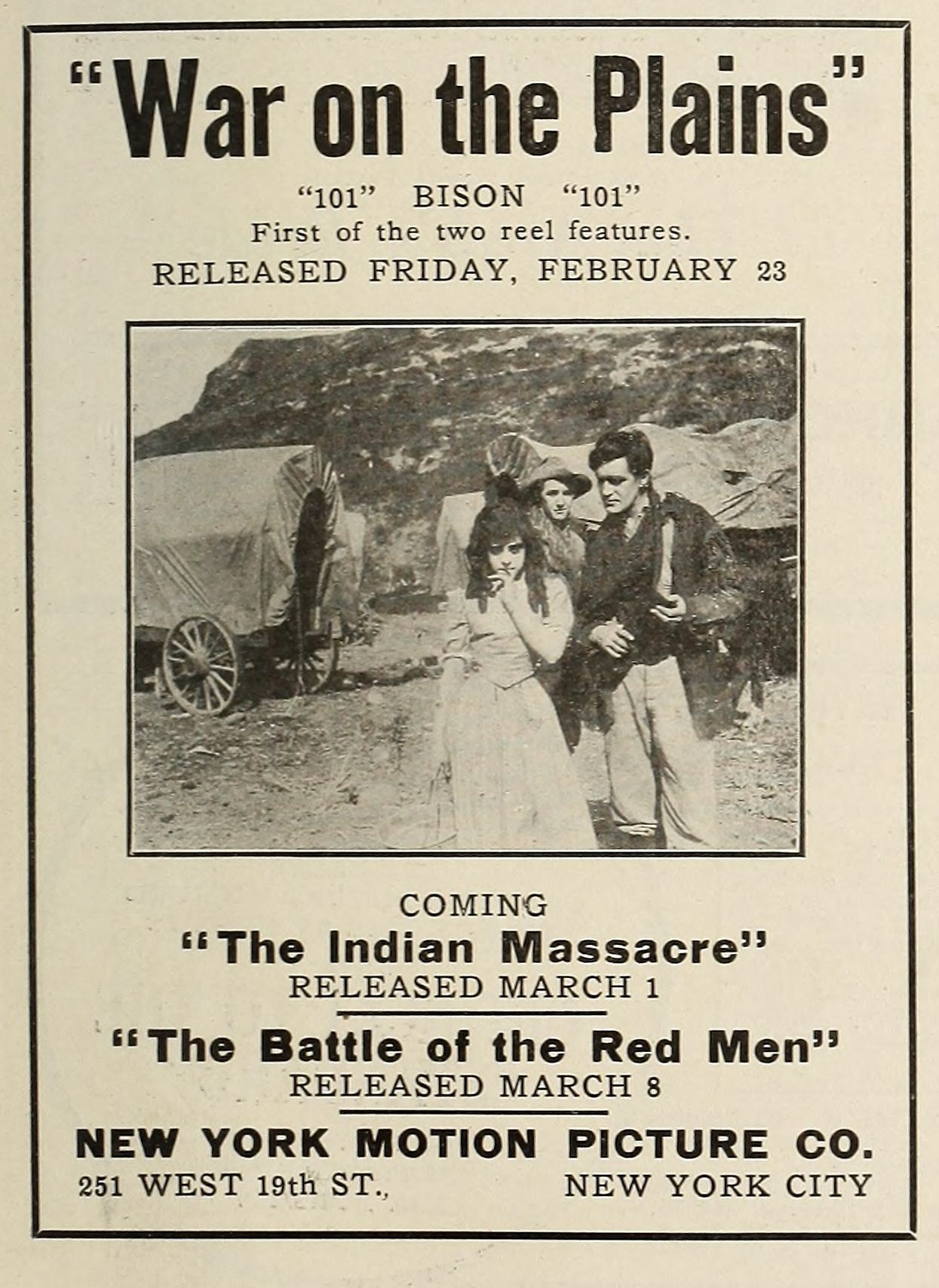
Unidentified castmembers in a 1912 film-industry magazine advertisement for War on the Plains, The Indian Massacre, and The Battle of the Red Men

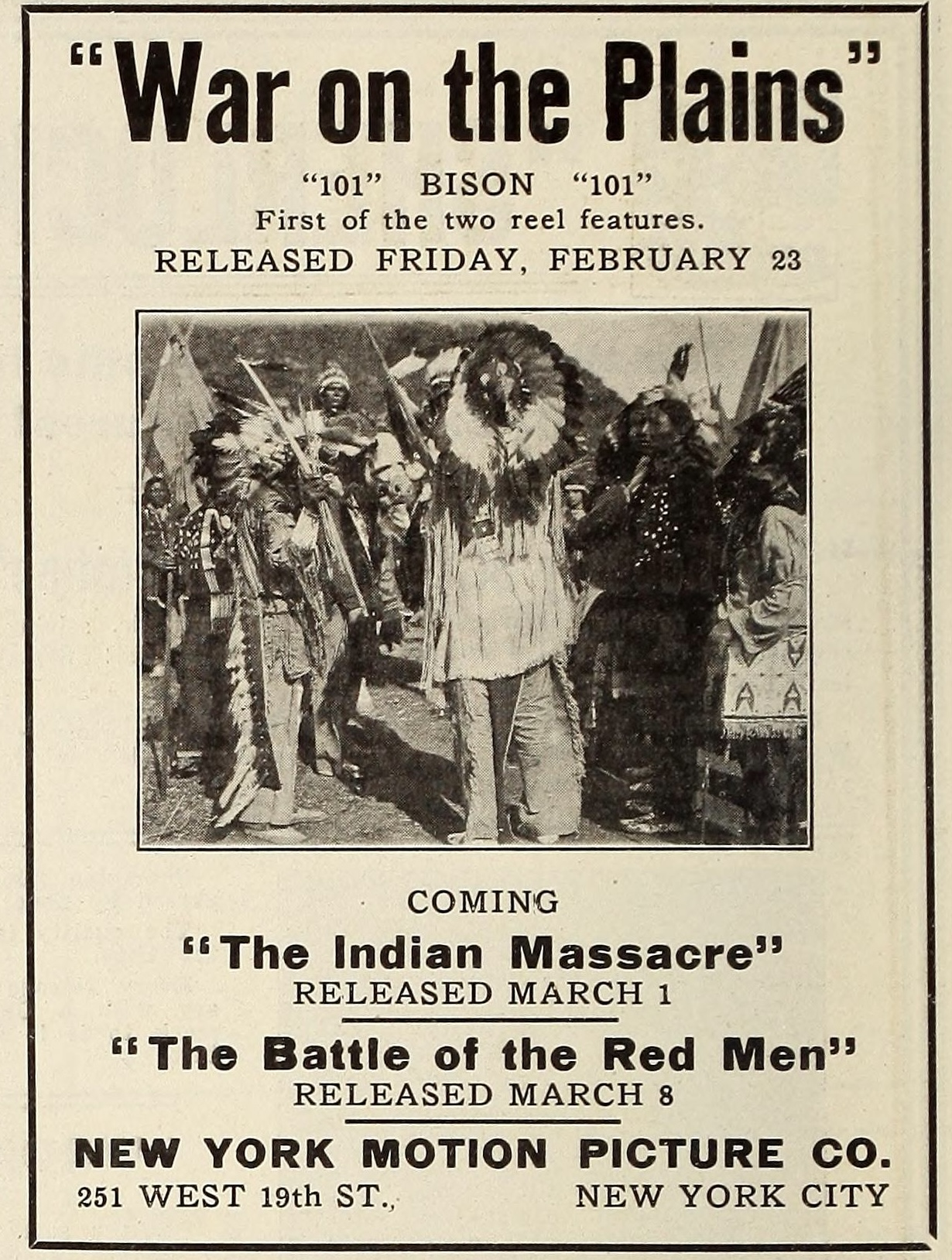
New York Motion Picture Company released The Battle of the Red Men in 1912, one of several 101 Bison films about "stirring military life in the early days of the West, thrilling battle, whirlwind cavalry charge", among other titles including Blazing the Trail, The Deserter, Indian Massacre, Lieutenant's Last Fight, and War on the Plains.

In March 1910, Zintkála Nuni worked as a mascot for the Omniciye Tonka Lakota, where she engaged in prostitution. In 1912, Zintkála was hired by Pathé and was involved in the following films: The Round-up, films for Essanay Pictures, Ammex Moving Picture Company and Thomas H. Ince: War on the Plains, The Battle of Red Men, and The Lieutenant's Last Fight, where she was an extra. Later, she joined the Buffalo Bill's Wild West show, which had merged with Sells-Floto Circus for the 1914–15 season, before starting her own vaudeville entertainment business with husband and fellow-performer Dick Allen.

== Involvement in suffrage movement ==
From an early age, Zintkála Nuni had a personal column in the National Woman Suffrage Association's Woman's Tribune newspaper, entitled "Zintkála's Corner". She accompanied Clara Colby in 1899 to London for the International Council of Women. She portrayed Pocahontas at the 1915 Panama-Pacific Exposition in San Francisco.

== Identity struggle ==
During her youth, Zintkála Nuni was frequently visited by prominent Native American figures, including Hawaiian Queen Liluokalani, fellow Wounded Knee survivors, and Red Cloud. Based on speculation that she may have been the daughter of Black-Day Woman, youngest wife of Sitting Bull, Zintkála Nuni often attempted to reach the South Dakota tribe with whom she most identified with.

In one letter to Clara Colby, Zintkála Nuni wrote: "I want to go there [Standing Rock Reservation] very very much. ... I don't belong here [Chemawa Boarding School] anyway and these are not my tribe of Indians and I hate it here. S.D. was the only place I was ever really and truly happy and why can't I go back there. ... This comes from my heart and not from my lips only." As biographer Renée Sansom Flood explains: "The cost of being taken from the Lakota was more than the loss of her language, her music, her food, her family kinship; it was the loss of her identity as a human being, the loss of her mind."

Zintkála Nuni formed a close friendship with fellow Wounded Knee child survivor Mary Thomas. In December 1915, she applied for citizenship of the Cheyenne River Sioux Reservation.

== Later life ==
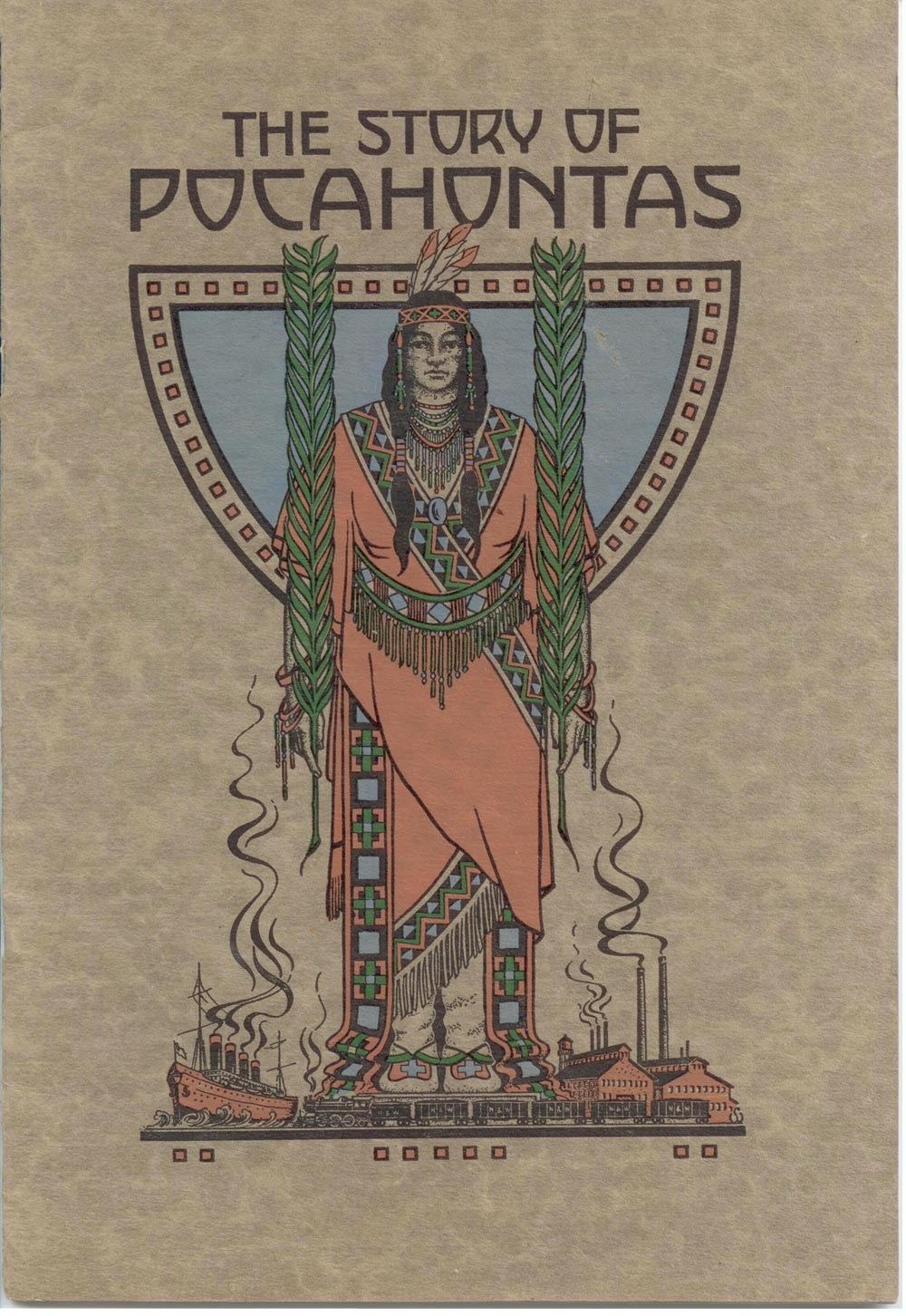
The Story of Pocahontas West Virginia Bldg. Coal Presentation at the Panama-Pacific International Exposition. It is unknown if the artist based his depiction on Zintkála Nuni's appearance

In December 1915, Zintkála Nuni's allotment on the Cheyenne River Sioux Reservation was sold without approval, provoking her and her third husband to move from a hotel room to his parents' home in Hanford, California three years later. Due to poverty and Allen's illness, Zintkála engaged in prostitution to raise funds. During this time, her husband and one child died.

Zintkála Nuni's illness gradually worsened throughout her life. She became blind in one of her eyes, skin blotched, and had affected organs. On February 14, 1920, Zintkála died of a heart failure, complicated by syphilis, during an epidemic of Spanish influenza. She was buried in a pauper's grave in Hanford, California.

== Personal life ==
=== Marriages ===
Zintkála returned to her adoptive mother who now lived in Portland, Oregon where she met Albert Chalivat, whom she married the day after they first met. The marriage took place in Washington because of miscegenation laws in the state of Oregon preventing Native American and Anglo-American inter-marriage.

The couple soon became estranged when it became apparent that Zintkála had contracted syphilis, most probably from Colby's sexual abuse. With no affordable cure for syphilis in 1909, Chalivat turned to alcohol. The couple separated after two weeks of marriage.

During her career in Hollywood, Zintkála Nuni married actor Robert 'Bob' Keith on May 31, 1913, in Santa Ana. Zintkála Nuni married under her stage name "Princeton Davis" since the previous marriage with Chalivat had not been annulled. Suffering abuse, Zintkála Nuni left in October 1913 with her child "Clyde".

In March 1915, Zintkála Nuni married fellow circus performer Dick Allen, with whom she had two more children.

=== Children ===
Nuni had three children. The first died on April 22, 1908, in the Milford Industrial Home. Her second son, Clyde, was born around the same time as her marriage to Keith and was given to a Native American woman in California in 1916, due to Nuni's inability to properly care for the child. His fate is unknown. Her third child did not survive childhood, and like Dick Allen died of sickness.

== Commemoration ==
On July 11, 1991, a ceremony led by nineteenth-generation Keeper of the Sacred Calf Pipe of the Lakota Nation, Arvol Looking Horse, was held at Wounded Knee, South Dakota to inter the transferred remains of Zintkala Nuni near the mass grave of her Lakota family. In her honor, the "Lost Bird Society" was created to help those Native Americans who were adopted outside their culture to recover their heritage.

Zintkála Nuni is the inspiration behind the main character of the children's story Yellow Star by Elaine Goodale Eastman.

== See also ==
- Zitkala-Sa – Yankton Dakota writer (1876–1938)
- Lyncoya Jackson – Creek Indian child adopted by Andrew Jackson, infant survivor of the Battle of Tallushatchee
