= Paddock Township =

Paddock Township may refer to one of the following places in the United States:

- Paddock Township, Otter Tail County, Minnesota
- Paddock Township, Gage County, Nebraska
- Paddock Township, Holt County, Nebraska
