= The Woman's Bible =

Book by Elizabeth Cady Stanton

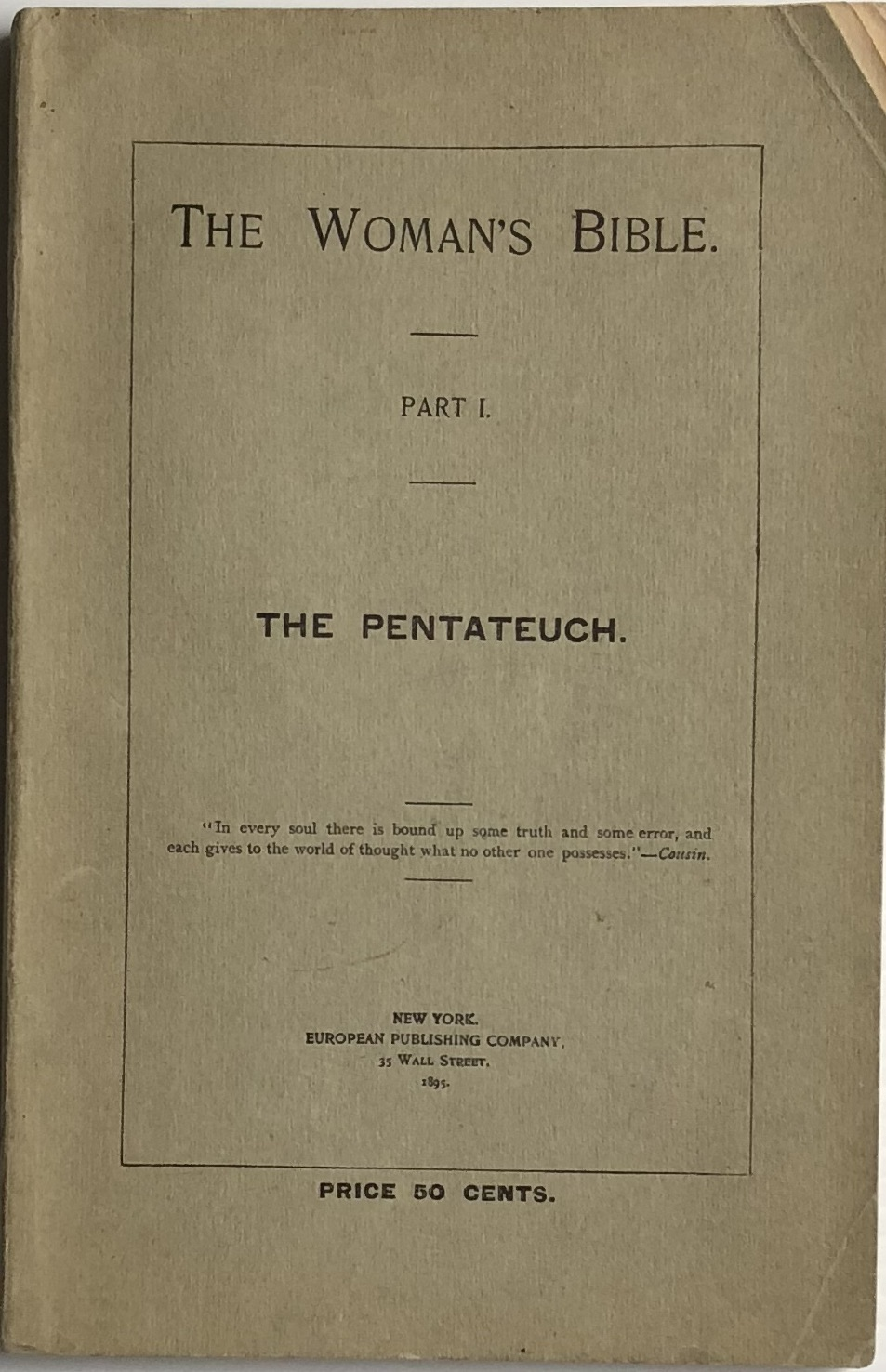
- This book, written by women, is a collection of critical commentaries on texts within chapters of the Bible directly referring to women with its purpose being to explore man's translations and their interpretations of Scriptures that make woman inferior to man.
- Author: Elizabeth Cady Stanton and further c. 26 women co-authors and commentators
- Publisher: European Publishing Company, New York
- Publication date: November, 1895
- Media type: paper, green covers, 6"x9"
- Pages: 152pp, 4pp ads

The Woman's Bible is a two-part non-fiction book, written by Elizabeth Cady Stanton and a committee of 26 women, published in 1895 and 1898 to challenge the traditional position of religious orthodoxy that woman should be subservient to man. By producing the book, Stanton wished to promote a radical liberating theology, one that stressed self-development. The book attracted a great deal of controversy and antagonism at its introduction.

Many women's rights activists who worked with Stanton were opposed to the publication of The Woman's Bible; they felt it would harm the drive for women's suffrage. Although it was never accepted by Bible scholars as a major work, much to the dismay of suffragists who worked alongside Stanton within the National American Woman Suffrage Association (NAWSA), it became a popular best-seller. Susan B. Anthony tried to calm the younger suffragists, but they issued a formal denunciation of the book at NAWSA's January 1896 convention, and worked to distance the suffrage movement from Stanton's broader scope which included attacks on traditional religion. Because of the widespread negative reaction, including that of suffragists who had been close to her, publication of the book effectively ended Stanton's influence in the suffrage movement.

== Background ==
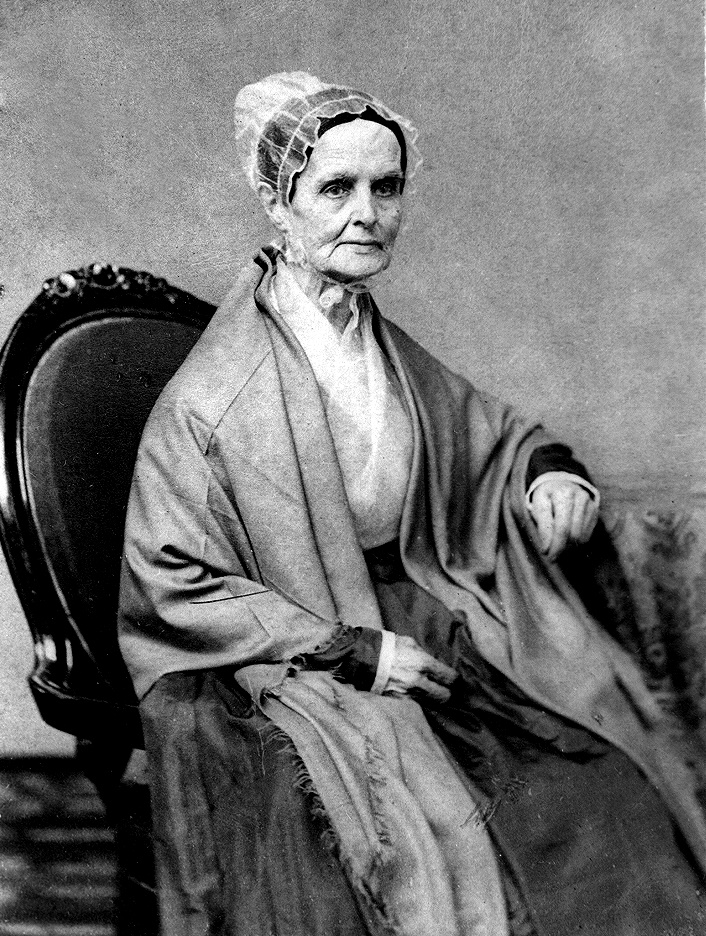
Lucretia Mott used Bible passages to answer those who argued for women's subservience.

In the early 19th century advocates of women's rights began to accumulate rebuttals to arguments used against them founded on traditional interpretations of Bible scriptures. Lucretia Mott countered those who would put her in her place by quoting other Bible passages, or by challenging the original interpretation of the scripture. In 1849, Mott wrote Discourse on Woman which discussed Adam and Eve, the activities of various women who appear in the Bible, and argued that the Bible supported woman's right to speak aloud her spiritual beliefs. Independently from Mott, Lucy Stone determined for herself that the male-dominant interpretations of the Bible must be faulty—she worked to learn Greek and Hebrew and thereby gain insight into the earlier Bible translations which she believed would contain wording more favorable to women's equality. In New York, aided by Mott, Elizabeth Cady Stanton helped draft the Declaration of Sentiments in 1848 and included two Resolutions which protested against man's usurpation of rights relating to her position in church and to her role under God. By the 1850s, Mott had become expert at disarming men who used Scripture against her. At the National Women's Rights Convention in 1852, and again in 1854, she stood up to debate men who came prepared with Scripture in hand. Reverend Henry Grew told the 1854 convention audience that the Bible proved men were naturally superior to women. He was countered point-by-point by Hannah Tracy Cutler, then in broad societal and political terms by Mott who began by saying: "It is not Christianity, but priestcraft that has subjected woman as we find her. The Church and State have been united, and it is well for us to see it so."

== Revising Committee ==
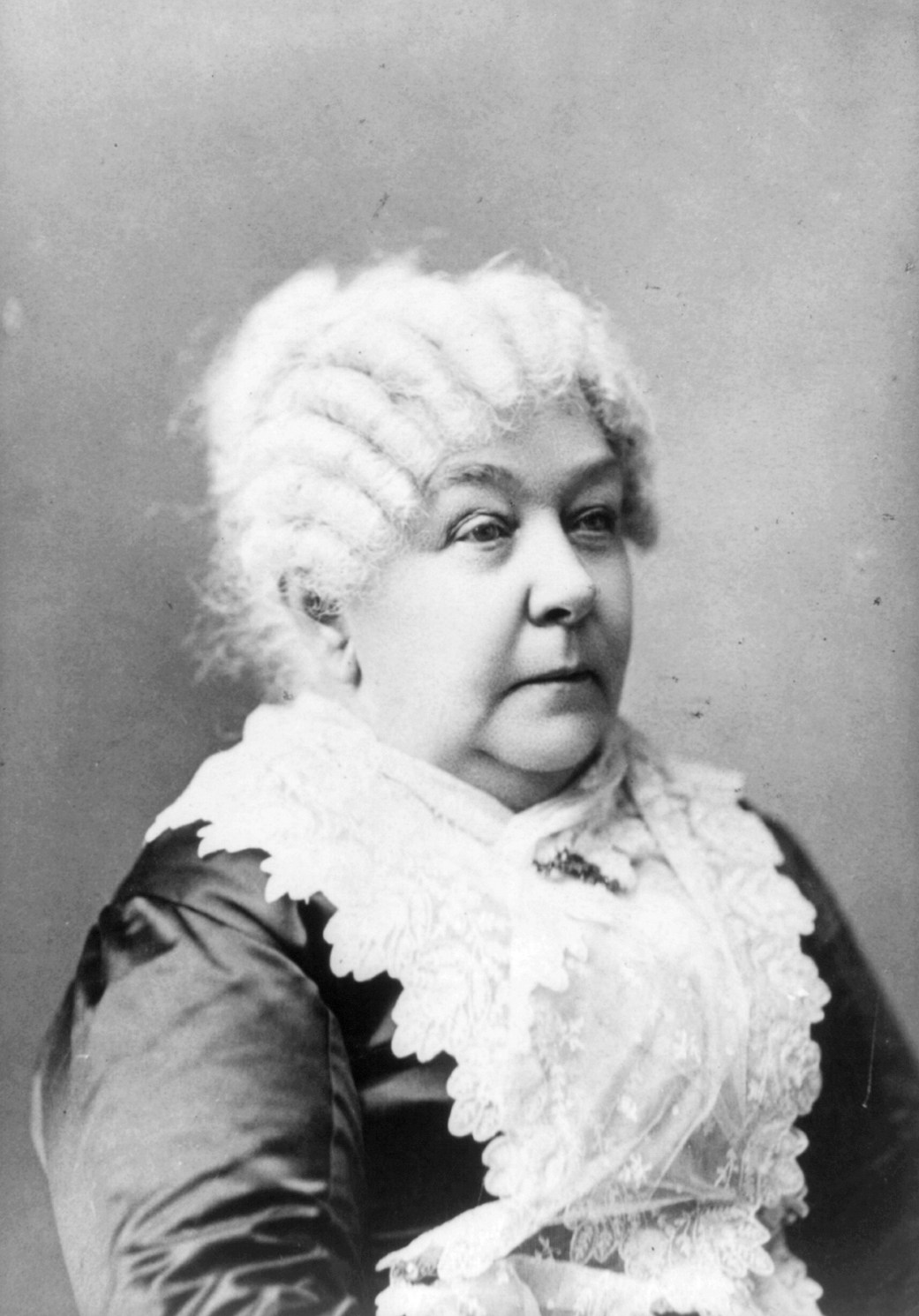
Elizabeth Cady Stanton was dissatisfied with both the King James Version and the Revised Version of the Bible.

In 1881, 1885 and 1894, the Church of England published a Revised Version of the Bible, the first new English version in over two centuries. Stanton was dissatisfied with the Revised Version's failure to incorporate recent scholarship from Bible translator Julia Evelina Smith. She wrote:

Whatever the Bible may be made to do in Hebrew or Greek, in plain English it does not exalt and dignify woman. My standpoint for criticism is the revised edition of 1888. I will so far honor the revising committee of wise men who have given us the best exegesis they can according to their ability, although Disraeli said the last one before he died, contained 150,000 blunders in the Hebrew, and 7,000 in the Greek.

Stanton assembled a "Revising Committee" to draft commentary on the new Bible version. Many of those she approached in person and by letter refused to take part, especially scholars who would be risking their professional reputations. Sharing Stanton's determination, the committee wished to correct biblical interpretation which they viewed as being biased against women, and to bring attention to the small fraction of the Bible which discussed women. They intended to demonstrate that it was not divine will that humiliated women, but human desire for domination.

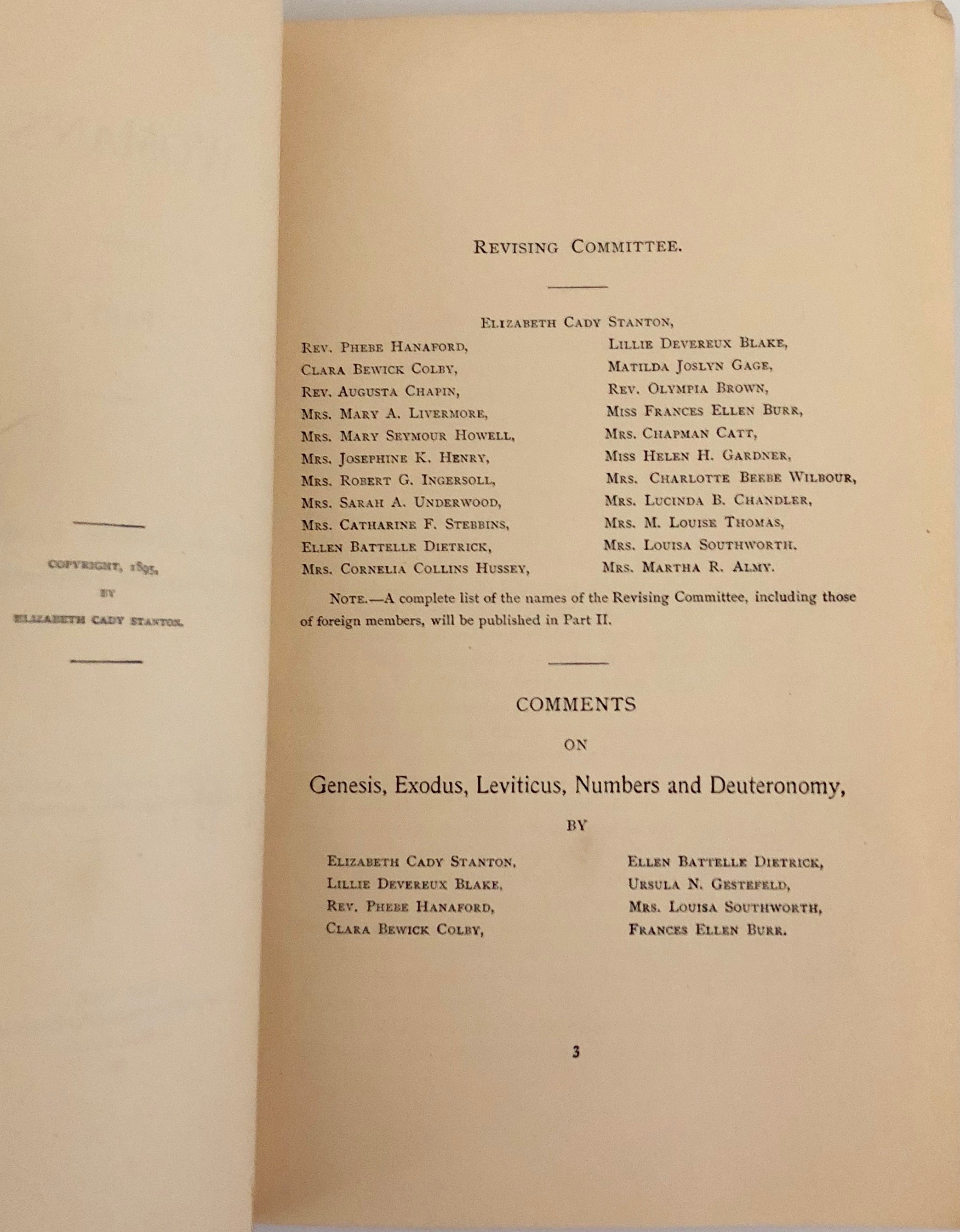
The Woman's Bible, Part I, first edition Revising Committee including Mrs. Chapman Catt

The committee was made up of women who were not Bible scholars, but who were interested in biblical interpretation and most were active in the NAWSA. In The Woman's Bible, Part I, first edition, released November 1895, the Revising Committee listed 23 members, including Phebe Ann Coffin Hanaford, Clara Bewick Colby, Augusta Jane Chapin, Lillie Devereux Blake, Matilda Joslyn Gage, Olympia Brown, and Carrie Chapman Catt. Just a few months later in early 1896, Part I, Second Edition was released permanently replacing Mrs. Catt's name with Mrs. Clara Neymann and adding a list of international members, notably among them were Alexandra Gripenberg, Ursula Mellor Bright and Irma von Troll-Borostyani.

In 1890 at the formation of the National American Woman Suffrage Association, Stanton was elected president. She left such duties to Susan B. Anthony and instead traveled to Europe for two years. While there she met with women who shared her views, and she gathered critical observations about the place of woman in the Bible. In Greenbank, Bristol, Stanton met with English suffragist Helen Bright Clark, and spoke to a group about the Bible position of woman. Clark questioned whether Stanton's liberal views had shocked some in attendance, and Stanton replied: "Well, if we who do see the absurdities of the old superstitions never unveil them to others, how is the world to make any progress in the theologies? I am in the sunset of life, and I feel it to be my special mission to tell people what they are not prepared to hear ..."

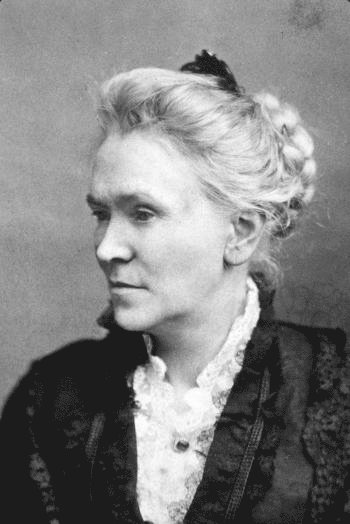
Matilda Joslyn Gage felt that the Bible, even when re-interpreted, could not support women's rights.

In 1893, Matilda Joslyn Gage took time out from her participation in the Revising Committee to write Woman, Church and State, a book which challenged traditional Judeo-Christian teaching that women were the source of sin, and that sex was sinful. Gage wrote that the double standard for morality hurt both sexes. Gage differed from most of the women on the Revising Committee in that she did not feel that the Bible, once interpreted in a more true, original form, would support women's rights. Gage determined that the Church had acted against women's interests in important ways: from Roman Catholic canon law, to Scripture, to its advocacy of celibacy and more. Especially troubling to Gage was the story of Adam and Eve.

== Publication ==
In November 1895, The Woman's Bible – Part I, first edition was published, covering the Pentateuch (the first five books of the Bible): Genesis, Exodus, Leviticus, Numbers, and Deuteronomy. It was a best seller. News sources reported the initial printing of the first edition Part I, consisting of 50,000 copies, sold out within three months and by May 2, 1896, Part I, Second Edition was selling rapidly.

In April 1898, Part II was published, covering the rest of the Old Testament as well as all of the New Testament. It included a Preface and an Appendix. The Preface was written by Stanton in which she acknowledged that "Both friend and foe object to the title." Nevertheless, she praised the Revising Committee for showing "a more worshipful reverence for the great Spirit of All Good than does the Church." Stanton wrote: "We have made a fetich [sic] of the Bible long enough. The time has come to read it as we do all other books, accepting the good and rejecting the evil it teaches." The Appendix consisted of Letters and Comments written by a multitude of contributors, as well as the resolution passed by the NAWSA, by which it repudiated "The Woman's Bible".

=== Contributors ===
Additional co-authors of the two volumes include Ellen Battelle Dietrick; Ursula Newell Gestefeld, a New Thought activist; Louisa Southworth, a suffragette and temperance movement activist; Frances Ellen Burr (1831–1923), a leading suffragette of Connecticut; Lucinda B. Chandler, a leader of the American women's rights movement with interest in New Thought; and Clara B. Neyman (1840–1931), New York suffragette and member of the Freethinkers. Other contributors to the Appendix are Mary A. Livermore, Frances E. Willard, Eva Amelia (Parker) Ingersoll (1841–1923), the wife of leading US agnostic Robert G. Ingersoll, Josephine K. Henry, and Catharine F. Stebbins.

== Reaction ==
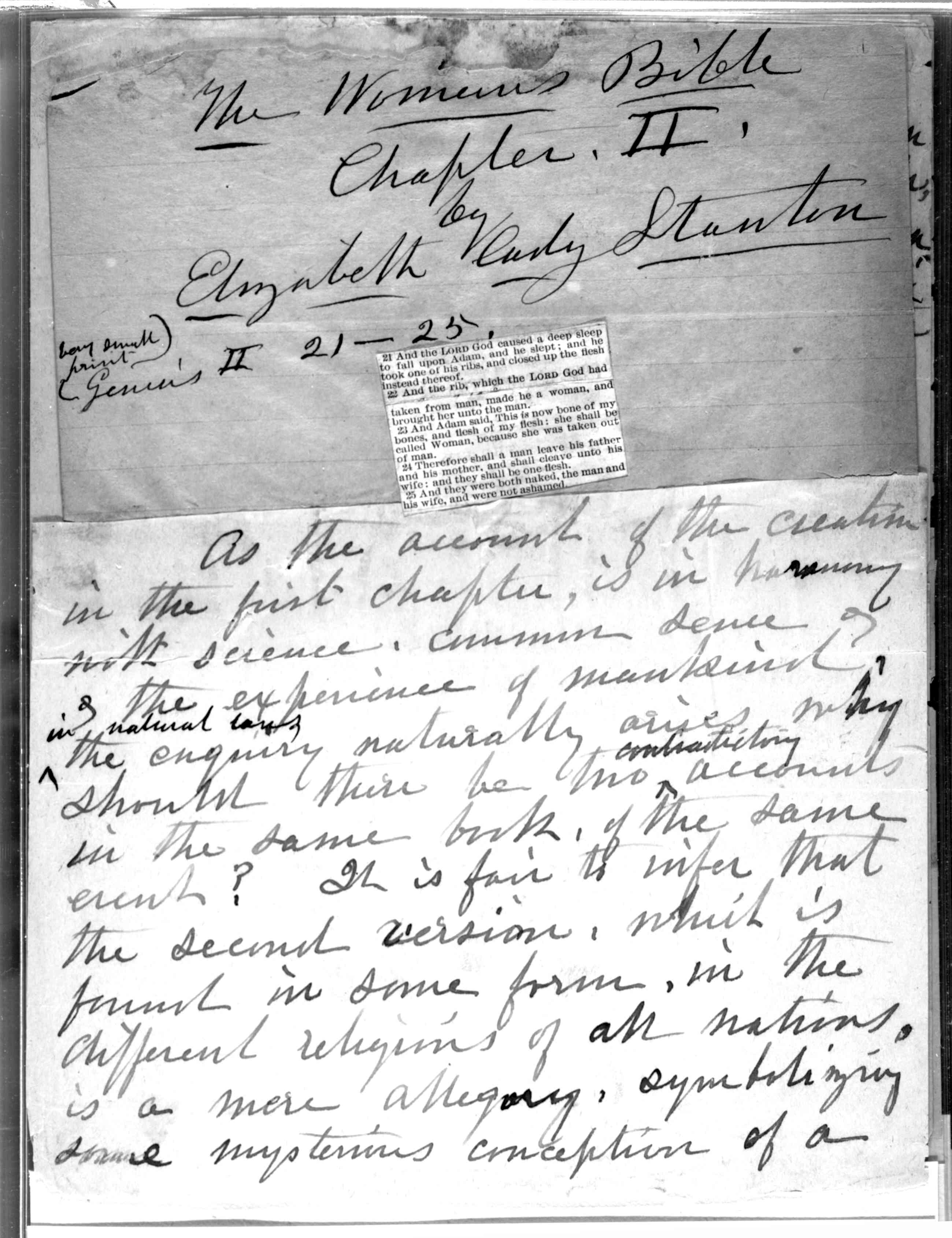
Handwritten draft of commentary covering the Book of Genesis, Chapter II, verses 21–25, concerning Adam and Eve

At its introduction, The Woman's Bible was widely criticized in editorials and from the pulpit. Stanton wrote that "the clergy denounced it as the work of Satan ..." Some were put off just by its prejudicial, sacrilegious title, especially those who did not take the time to read the book. Others countered the book's more extreme conclusions one by one in public fora such as letters to the editor. One female reader of The New York Times wrote to decry The Woman's Bible for its radical statements that the Trinity was composed of "a Heavenly Mother, Father, and Son", and that prayers should be addressed to an "ideal Heavenly Mother". Mary Seymour Howell, a member of the Revising Committee, wrote to The New York Times in defense of the book, saying that its title could be better understood as "The Woman's Commentary on the Women of the Bible". Stanton countered attacks by women readers, writing "the only difference between us is, we say that these degrading ideas of woman emanated from the brain of man, while the church says that they came from God."

Susan B. Anthony, Stanton's best and most faithful collaborator, concluded after years of working for women's rights that the concentration on one issue—votes for women—was the key to bringing success to the movement. The women's organizations had too varied a membership to agree on anything more complex. Stanton insisted, however, that the women's rights conventions were too narrowly focused; she brought forward a variety of challenging concepts in the form of essays for Anthony to read to the audiences. When Stanton made known her interest in completing The Woman's Bible, Anthony was unhappy at the futility of the effort, a harmful digression from the focused path which led to woman suffrage. Anthony wrote to Clara Bewick Colby to say of Stanton "of all her great speeches, I am always proud—but of her Bible commentaries, I am not proud—either of their spirit or letter ... But I shall love and honor her to the end—whether her Bible please me or not. So I hope she will do for me."

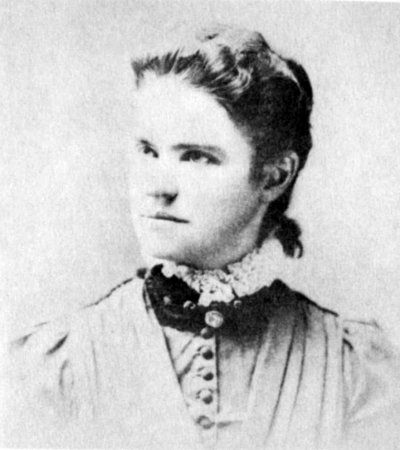
Rachel Foster Avery thought The Woman's Bible hindered the cause for women's suffrage.

At the NAWSA convention January 23–28, 1896, Corresponding Secretary Rachel Foster Avery led the battle to distance the organization from The Woman's Bible. After Susan B. Anthony opened the convention on January 23, Avery surprised Anthony by stating to the more than 100 members of the audience:

During the latter part of the year the work has been in several directions much hindered by the general misconception of the relation of the so-called "Woman's Bible" to our association. As an organization we have been held responsible for the action of an individual ... in issuing a volume with a pretentious title, covering a jumble of comment ... without either scholarship or literary value, set forth in a spirit which is neither reverent nor inquiring.

Avery called for a resolution: "That this Association is non-sectarian, being composed of persons of all shades of religious opinion, and that it has no connection with the so-called 'Woman's Bible', or any theological publication." The motion was tabled until later, and motions were made to strike Avery's comments from the official record. A complete account of Avery's remarks were reported the next day in The New York Times.

The opinion of NAWSA delegate Laura Clay, expressed in her Southern Committee report on January 27 that "the South is ready for woman suffrage, but it must be woman suffrage and nothing else," was typical of responses to The Woman's Bible conflict. Most suffragists wanted only to work on the right to vote, "without attaching it to dress reform, or bicycling, or anything else ..."

On the afternoon of January 28, a list of Resolutions was put to a vote. The first seven were passed without comment. The eighth was Avery's proposed dissociation with The Woman's Bible, and its presence caused an active debate. Anna Howard Shaw, Alice Stone Blackwell, Henry Browne Blackwell, Carrie Chapman Catt and others spoke in favor, while Colby, Lillie Devereux Blake, and more spoke against it. Anthony left her chair to join the debate against the resolution, and spoke at length, saying "Lucretia Mott at first thought Mrs. Stanton had injured the cause of woman's rights by insisting on the demand for woman suffrage, but she had sense enough not to pass a resolution about it ..." A majority of 53 to 41 delegates approved the resolution, an action which was seen as a censure of Stanton, and one which was never repealed. Avery's opening report of January 23 was adopted with the part about The Woman's Bible expunged.

Stanton did not attend the 1896 convention; she was 80 years old, obese, and bedridden. She acknowledged the controversy stirred by the publication of the first part, but continued writing the second part of the book, and she worked on her autobiography Eighty Years & More: Reminiscences 1815–1897. She wrote to her longtime friend Reverend Antoinette Brown Blackwell in April, 1896 to observe: "Our politicians are calm and complacent under our fire but the clergy jump round the moment you aim a pop gun at them 'like parched peas on a hot skillet'".

Stanton was marginalized in the women's suffrage movement after publication of The Woman's Bible, solidifying Susan B. Anthony's leadership position in that movement. Stanton was never again invited to sit on stage at NAWSA conventions.

== 1920: The Woman's Bible and the 19th Amendment ==
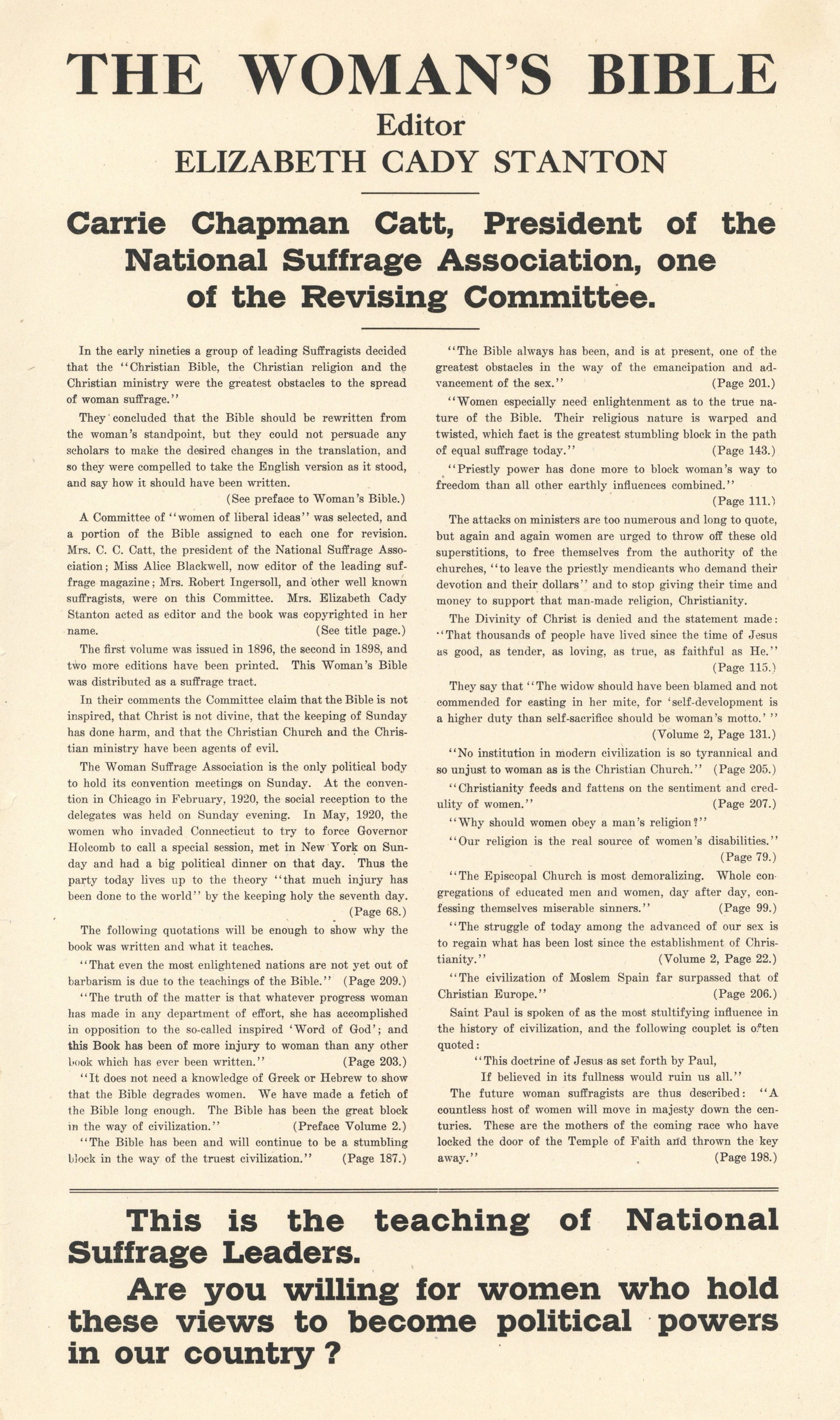
The Woman's Bible broadside, produced by Anti-suffragists to fight the ratification of the 19th Amendment to the U. S. Constitution

According to historian and author Kathi Kern, "The Woman's Bible proved to be the most devastating weapon in the antisuffrage arsenal."

In 1920, during the last battles for ratification of the 19th Amendment in Tennessee and North Carolina, Anti-suffragists weaponized the first edition of The Woman's Bible, Part I with Carrie Chapman Catt's name listed among the Revising Committee. Despite Catt's consistent denials of the book, according to recollections of Tennessee suffragist Abby Crawford Milton, "They called it Mrs. Catt's Bible, ... there were 26 ministers of churches in Nashville ... who were converted against women suffrage by being shown that book."

In July and August, they maintained an exhibit in their mezzanine headquarters at the Hermitage Hotel in Nashville, TN, and prominently displayed several first edition Woman's Bibles and other literature supporting their anti-ratification views. They promoted their exhibit with WOMAN'S BIBLE broadsides to be displayed about town and advertisements in Tennessee newspapers inviting the public, especially the clergy, to "Come and See" their Woman's Bibles associating Mrs. Catt, then 1920 president of the National American Woman Suffrage Association, with Elizabeth Cady Stanton, former president of the NAWSA and other prominent suffragists who, by having their names printed among the Revising Committee and their printed commentaries in such an irreligious book, were accused of rejecting the traditional principles of the Bible that held women in their God ordained sphere.

Tennessee newspapers, including Nashville Banner and The Tennessean and others across the state reported the furious discourse between the parties.

In The Tennessean, August 15, 1920, Mrs. Catt denied the charge against her,

"I was never a member of a 'revising committee' for the Woman's Bible, and although asked to be a member of the committee, I declined, and any printing of my name in connection with the book has been without my knowledge or consent. I never wrote a word of the Woman's Bible, nor did I see anything written by anyone else before it was printed.

At the first annual convention of the National American Woman Suffrage Association, I spoke and voted for a resolution repudiating the Woman's Bible and that is part of the record of the Association. The Woman's Bible was never circulated by the Association.

The above statement of fact has been made so often that continued publication of the false assertion can only be interpreted as intentional and malicious."

The Anti's purpose was to stir outrage and line up legislators to vote against passage of the 19th Amendment to the U. S. Constitution. They asked, "Are you willing for women who hold these views to become political powers in our country?"

Ms. Kern summarized those historical events.

“Twenty-five years later [after 1895], Catt was dogged by this conflict; the "Antis" had dug up a first edition, advertised it as "Mrs. Catt's Bible," and used it skillfully among the clergy. And, try as she might, Mrs. Catt simply could not "deny it" enough. Supporters of woman suffrage were narrowly victorious in Tennessee; the legislature ratified the Nineteenth Amendment by a single vote. And yet, twenty-five years after it first appeared in print, the Woman's Bible still wreaked political havoc among supporters of woman's rights.”

== Legacy ==
Stanton wished for a greater degree of scholarship in The Woman's Bible, but was unable to convince Bible scholars of her day to take part in what was expected to be a controversial project. Scholars continued to avoid addressing the subject of sexism in the Bible until 1964 when Margaret Brackenbury Crook published Women and Religion, a study of the status of women in Judaism and Christianity. In her 1973 book Beyond God the Father, Mary Daly discussed The Woman's Bible, and subsequent works by Letty Russell and Phyllis Trible furthered the connection between feminism and the Bible. Today, biblical scholarship by women has come into maturity, with women posing new questions about the Bible, and challenging the very basis of biblical studies.
