= Algernon Paddock =

American politician (1830–1897)

Algernon Sidney Paddock
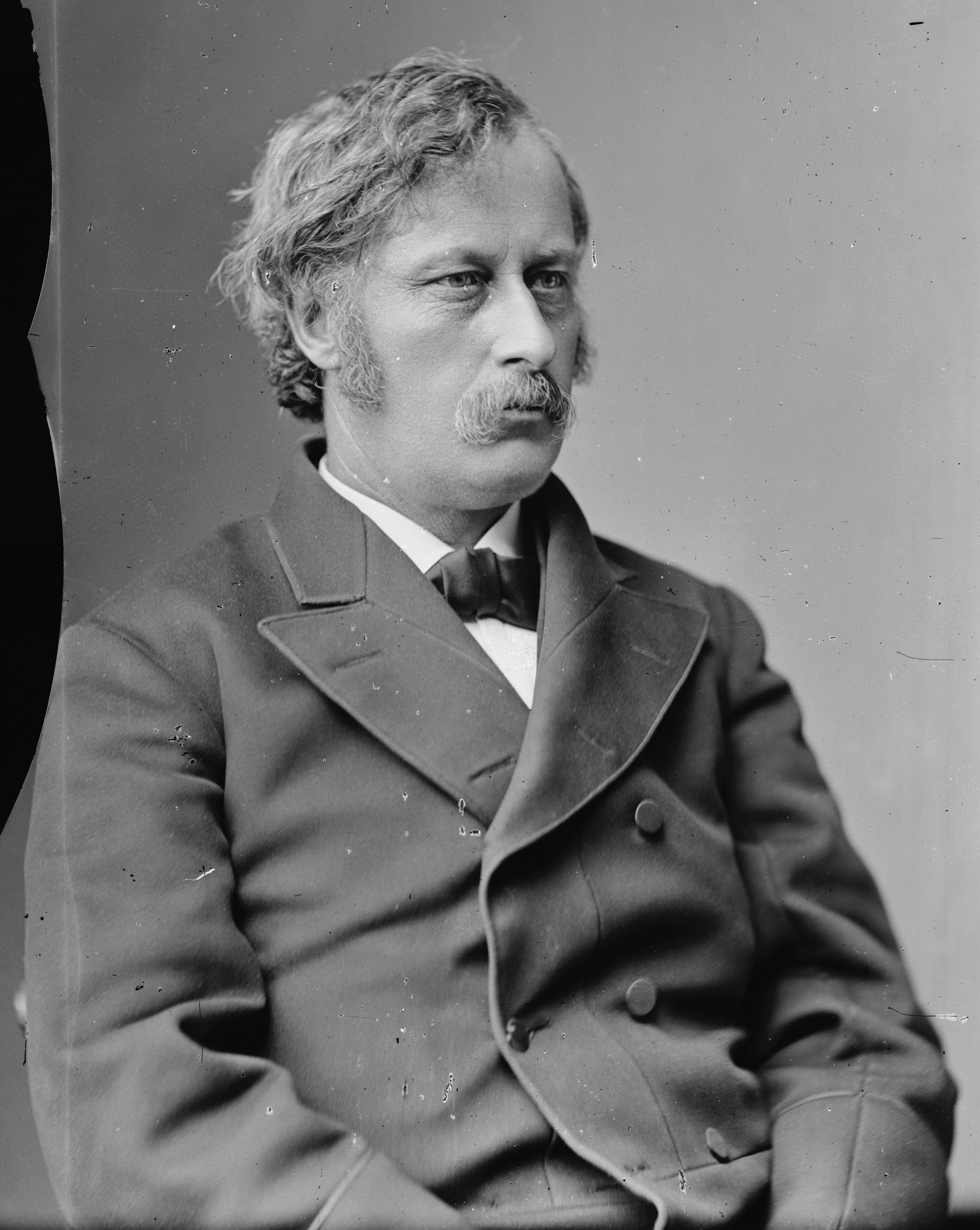

Secretary of Nebraska Territory
- In office 1861–1867
- Appointed by: Abraham Lincoln

Acting Governor of Nebraska Territory
- In office March 6, 1861 – May 15, 1861
- Appointed by: Abraham Lincoln
- Preceded by: J. Sterling Morton as Acting Territorial Governor
- Succeeded by: Alvin Saunders as Territorial Governor

United States Senator from Nebraska
- In office March 4, 1875 – March 3, 1881
- Preceded by: Thomas W. Tipton
- Succeeded by: Charles H. Van Wyck
- In office March 4, 1887 – March 3, 1893
- Preceded by: Charles H. Van Wyck
- Succeeded by: William V. Allen

Personal details
- Born: November 9, 1830 Glens Falls, New York, U.S.
- Died: October 17, 1897 (aged 66) Beatrice, Nebraska, U.S.
- Party: Republican
- Spouse: Emma Mack
- Education: Union College

Algernon Sidney Paddock (November 9, 1830 – October 17, 1897) was an American politician who was a Republican secretary of Nebraska Territory and U.S. Senator from Nebraska after statehood.

== Biography ==
Paddock was born in Glens Falls, New York. His father, Ira Paddock, was a prominent lawyer. Algernon lived in upstate New York until the age of 27, attending Glens Falls Academy and Union College, teaching school and studying law. He visited a brother in Detroit, Michigan, for three months after college, but then returned to New York.

The anti-polygamist activist Cornelia Paddock was the wife of Paddock's cousin, Alonzo Paddock.

=== Settling in Omaha ===
In 1857, Paddock left New York and settled in Omaha, Nebraska, where he started a family and a farm practice. He became a member of the United States Republican Party in which he would be active for the rest of his life. He successfully ran for a seat in the Nebraska Territory house of representatives in 1859. He helped edit the newspaper Nebraska Republican from 1858 to 1859. He attended a territorial convention in 1859 and the Republican Convention as a delegate in 1860. In 1860, he campaigned heavily for Abraham Lincoln in Nebraska and New York.

In 1861, Paddock was appointed by Lincoln as secretary of the Nebraska Territory. He held that position until Nebraska became a state in 1867; he was also acting governor in 1861. When Nebraska became a state, he ran for seats in both the United States House and United States Senate, but lost. President Andrew Johnson offered him the position of governor of Wyoming Territory, but Paddock declined that position.

=== Marriage ===
In 1869, Paddock married Emma Mack, and they had several children. In 1872, he moved from Omaha to Beatrice, Nebraska, where he started a farm and a factory. In 1875, he was elected to the United States Senate. As a senator, he was chairman of the Agriculture Committee from 1877 to 1878. He was defeated for re-election in 1880.

=== Utah Territory Commission ===
In 1882, Paddock became part of a commission which set up elections in Utah Territory. He used this position to try to discourage the practice of polygamy in Utah. He was a member of the commission until 1886, when he was again elected to the United States Senate from Nebraska. He served another 6-year term, from 1887 to 1893, during which he was chairman of two committees. In 1891, he introduced an unsuccessful bill to regulate certain food production for safety reasons. After his death, similar and more extensive laws on this issue were passed.

=== Later life ===
After retiring from the Senate in 1893, Paddock returned to Beatrice, where he engaged in brokerage business until his death. After he died, he was interred at Prospect Hill Cemetery in North Omaha.

Algernon is the namesake of Paddock, Holt County, Nebraska.

U.S. Senate
Preceded by Thomas Tipton	U.S. senator (Class 1) from Nebraska; 1875–1881; Served alongside: Phineas W. Hitchcock, Alvin Saunders	Succeeded by Charles Van Wyck
Preceded by Charles Van Wyck	U.S. senator (Class 1) from Nebraska; 1887–1893; Served alongside: Charles F. Manderson	Succeeded by William V. Allen
