= The Woman's Tribune =

American newspaper

The Woman's Tribune was an American newspaper founded in Beatrice, Nebraska, by women's suffrage activist Clara Bewick Colby. In print from 1883 to 1909, published in Beatrice and in Washington, D.C., the newspaper connected radical feminism with women's culture on the Midwestern frontier. Throughout its run, its slogan was "Equality Before the Law."

== Background ==
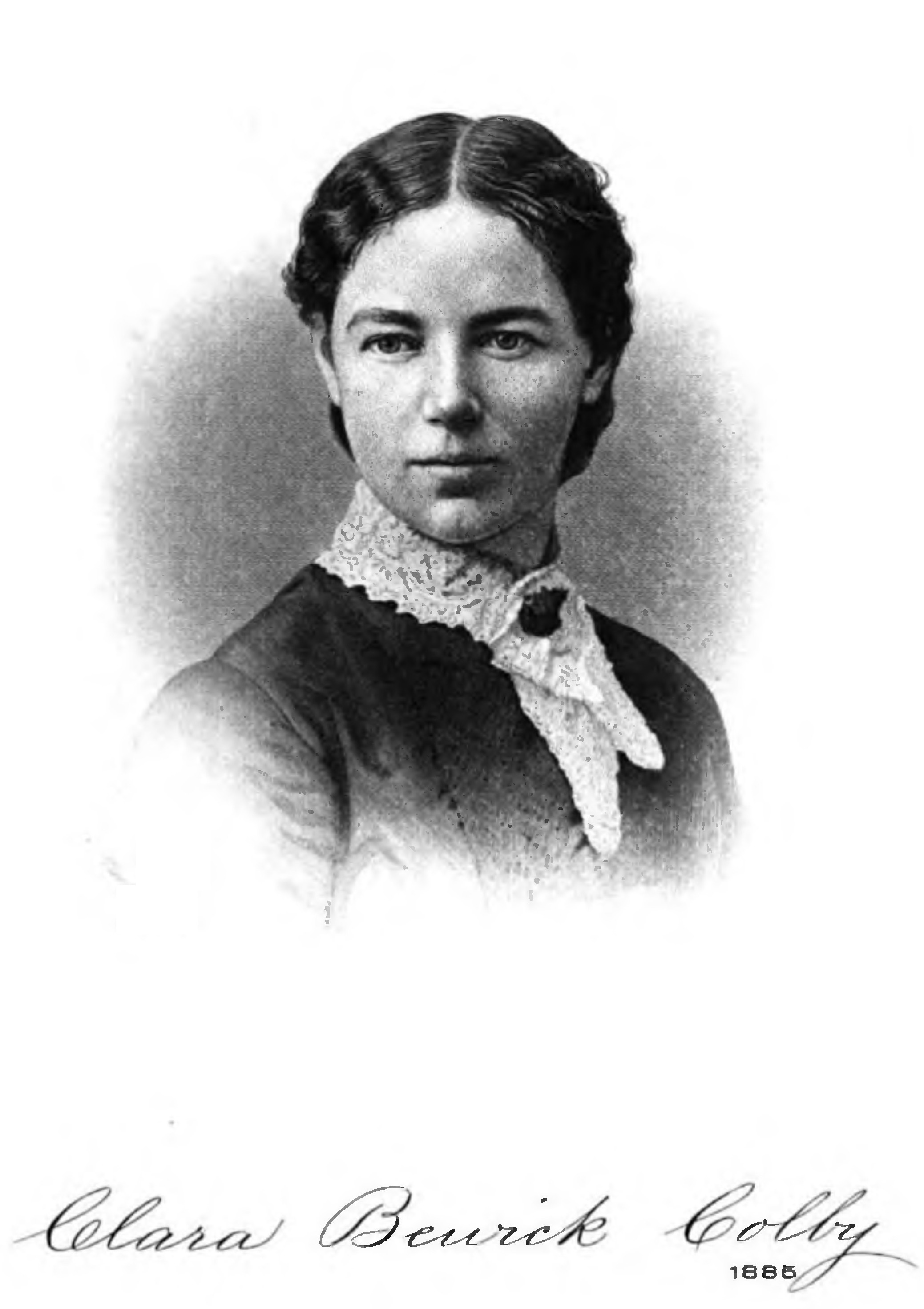
Clara Bewick Colby (1846 - 1916)

Clara Bewick Colby (1846-1916) was appointed Vice President of the Nebraska Woman Suffrage Association (WSA) in 1881. Through the WSA, Colby founded The Woman’s Tribune in 1883 and took over a majority of its operation. She wrote, edited, copyedited, and at times even typeset the paper. The newspaper was solely ran by a woman, which was unique at the time. Many other feminist publications were often edited by women, but funded and published by men.

The goal of The Woman's Tribune was to act as an educational, political, and social tool. The Woman's Tribune sought to develop a readership of women who could become active agents in a unified feminist movement. Colby did not impose one specific political agenda on her readers but rather encouraged independent thinking by educating readers about feminism and the wider feminist movement. Notices of events in the international suffragist community appeared as well, connecting women on the American frontier to women's suffrage campaigns in Europe and Asia.

The Woman's Tribune fostered a sense of community among women; it was created for women, by women, and about women. The Tribune was both an intellectual and emotional resource. It acted as a tool to develop a readership of women who could then become active agents in a unified feminist movement. The publication included diverse and varied content, merging women's ordinary life with radical and revolutionary feminist empowerment.

=== National Woman Suffrage Association ===
Until 1890, The Woman’s Tribune served as the suffrage newspaper with the best source of information on the National Woman Suffrage Association (NWSA). Although never an official part of the NWSA, The Woman’s Tribune served as a major place of expression for the organization. This status ended with the 1890 merger of the NWSA and the American Woman Suffrage Association (AWSA) creating the National American Woman Suffrage Association (NAWSA), with its official newspaper The Woman’s Journal. Despite competition from The Woman’s Journal, publication of The Woman's Tribune continued until financial reasons led to the termination of the paper.

Throughout the Tribune's print, Colby met and corresponded with Elizabeth Cady Stanton, Susan B. Anthony, and Matilda Joslyn Gage. She frequently published their work and speeches made at International Council of Women meetings. These published articles included sections of Elizabeth Cady Stanton’s controversial work The Woman’s Bible. This reflected Colby's promotion of complete religious freedom as well as the paper's openness to all earnest thought. Yet, the Tribune received little financial contributions from the NWSA of which Stanton was president. The newspaper experienced constant financial struggles. Despite a lack of financial support, Colby managed to keep The Woman's Tribune in production for twenty six years. The publication only accepted advertising that was educational or beneficial to women’s lives and never raised subscription prices to more than a dollar per year.

Despite status within the NWSA, The Woman's Tribune was at times criticized for publishing about the broader subjects of women's lives versus the fight for narrow legislative reforms. With some feminists viewing Colby's publication as detrimental to the women's suffrage movement because of this. Colby, however, purposely directed The Woman’s Tribune to address women who were missing from this mainstream constituent, and Elizabeth Cady Stanton praised the Tribune's feminist vision. Despite Colby’s commitment to the NWSA, she remained steadfast towards addressing the diversity of the Tribune's audience and their informational needs. By intertwining the daily lives of individual women and women's culture with a wider feminist vision, The Woman's Tribune brought awareness to the possibility of liberty and equality for women.

== Content ==
The Woman's Tribune routinely included a wide range of material, including generalist news, suffrage news, book reviews, travelogues, editorials, poetry, and joke columns. Content ranged from tips on preserving flowers and lemons to educational articles and short stories on influential women in history. Advertising within the Tribune focused on products and services provided by and for women.

The Woman's Tribune featured a diverse variety of political and domestic content that created a sense of community among women while simultaneously promoting feminist suffrage, activism, reform, and education. As women were rejecting restrictive domestic roles, the Tribune's content encouraged them to take part in social change through discussions on politics, philosophy, religion, and social life. It included a "Notes About Women" section with news about the local, national, and international achievements of women. Other content and themes within the publication included ongoing feminist analysis of a woman's role in marriage, notes on less conservative views of dress reform, race relations, facts and reports on women's suffrage, poverty, divorce, custody laws, and philosophies on motherhood. This highlighted to readers what women could achieve and how they could participate in social change through the use of real-life examples of women's late nineteenth century social and historical events.

=== Diversity ===
Colby's reporting within The Woman's Tribune frequently included pro-Native American positions, inspired by her husband Leonard Wright Colby's work overseeing federal damage-compensation cases involving Native tribes while serving as Assistant Attorney General, and also by their adopted Lakota daughter Zintka Lanuni. Colby expressed her philosophies of race relations within the publication through her words about her daughter. She presented motherhood as progressive, nurturing, loving, and politically engaged within her publication.

The Tribune brought awareness to issues faced specifically by women of color. Colby published editorials addressing American imperialism and oppression toward Native Hawaiian, Philippine, and Cuban women. The Tribune also gave space to African American leaders involved in the feminist movement, including when it reprinted accounts of Sojourner Truth's "Ain't I a Woman?" speech and printed remarks made by Frederick Douglass.

=== Audience ===
Unlike other suffrage papers that focused on urban culture and politics, The Woman's Tribune appealed to the rural and everyday woman which made it one of the most powerful voices of feminist ideology during its day. In addition, some stories and features were intended to be read to children, presumably by their mothers, making the Tribune unusual in its explicitly multi-generational audience. Aimed toward reform-minded women, the Tribune offered a broader perspective on women and their roles in the nineteenth century, and ultimately allowed women to engage with the practical and political dimensions of their lives.

== Connections to Feminist Movement ==
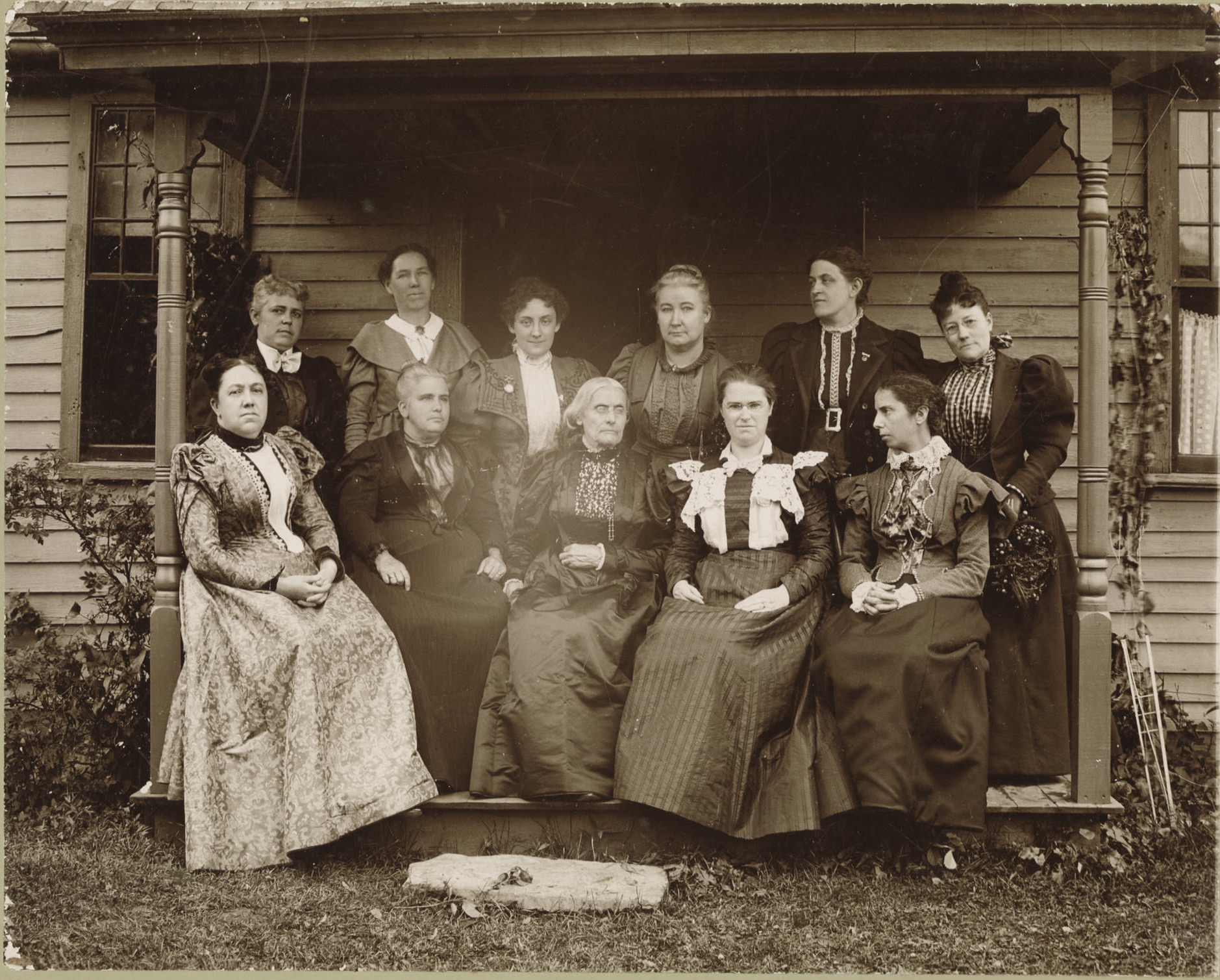
1896 portrait of Susan B. Anthony (center) with other woman's rights leaders. The woman in the second row, second from the left is believed to be Clara Bewick Colby.

The Woman's Tribune made a space for feminist education while informing readers on the history of the women's movement as it was made. Colby is credited for locating a foundational power of the feminist movement in rural women who may not have seen themselves as feminist activists but through this publication found a united purpose in the fight for equality. The Tribune became recognized as a vehicle to address the barriers women experienced, convince women of their own power to create change, and to organize women to effect that change.

Colby was a radical feminist of the late nineteenth century, and radical feminists viewed men's oppression of women, legitimized within social institutions, in connection to a belief that women were culturally superior to men in unique ways. Radical feminism criticized men's violence and aggressiveness as the cause of wars, abuse, and poverty while praising women for their roles as nurturers. Through the Tribune, Colby encouraged a movement toward social change that aligned with frontier women, working class women, housewives, and mothers who were beginning to reject the strict definition of domesticity and womanhood especially prevalent in frontier life. The Tribune praised the more everyday achievements of women rooted in their daily lives while bringing to their attention the necessity of true equality for women that could be achieved when women worked together.

== See also ==
List of women's suffrage publications

== Bibliography ==
- Jerry, Claire E (1991). “Clara Bewick Colby and the Woman’s Tribune, 1883–1909: The Free Lance Editor as Movement Leader,” in A Voice Of Their Own: The Woman Suffrage Press, 1840–1910, ed. Martha M. Solomon. Tuscaloosa: University of Alabama Press.
- "The Woman's Tribune ([Beatrice, Neb.]) 1883-1909 [Microfilm Reel]". Library of Congress. Retrieved 2020-03-31.
- Bloomberg, Kristin Mapel (February 2006). "Cultural critique and consciousness raising: Clara Bewick Colby's Woman's Tribune and late-nineteenth-century radical Feminism". in Women in Print; Essays on the Print Culture of American Women from the Nineteenth and Twentieth Centuries, ed. James P. Danky, Wayne A. Wiegand.Wisconsin: University of Wisconsin Press. pp. 27–63. ISBN 978-0-299-21784-6
- Willis, Olympia Brown; Stone, Lucy; National American Woman Suffrage Association Collection (Library of Congress) DLC [from old catalog] (1917). Democratic ideals; a memorial sketch of Clara B. Colby. unknown library. [The Federal suffrage association]. p. 36.
- Lomicky, Carol S. (October 2002). "Frontier Feminism and the Woman's Tribune: The Journalism of Clara Bewick Colby". Journalism History. 28 (3): 102–111. doi:10.1080/00947679.2002.12062602. ISSN 0094-7679.
- Minyard, Sally (December 2020). "Between Discord and Progress: Suffrage Periodicals and the Woman's Rights Movement, 1869-1890". Commerce ProQuest Dissertations & Theses, p. 138.
- Lorber, Judith (November 1997). "The Variety of Feminisms and their Contributions to Gender Equality". Nr. 97. Oldenburg: Oldenburger Universitätsreden. https://oops.uni-oldenburg.de/1269/1/ur97.pdf
- Gordon, Ann D. (2009). The Selected Papers of Elizabeth Cady Stanton and Susan B. Anthony; Their Place Inside the Body-Politic, 1887 to 1895. New Jersey: Rutgers University Press. p. 8-727. ISBN 978-0-8135-6440-1
- Harper, Judith. “The Woman’s Tribune.” In Women’s Rights in the United States: A Comprehensive Encyclopedia of Issues, Events, and People (2): 258–362. (2015).
- Bloomberg, Kristin Mapel (2015). "Women and Rural Social Reform in the 1870s and 1880s: Clara Bewick Colby's "Farmers' Wives"". Agricultural History. 89 (3): 402–425. doi:10.3098/ah.2015.089.3.402. ISSN 0002-1482.
