= 2012 2000 Guineas Stakes =

2013 2000 Guineas Stakes
- 2000 Guineas Stakes
- Racing colours of the winner
- Location: Newmarket Racecourse
- Date: 5 May 2012
- Winning horse: Camelot
- Starting price: 15/8 fav
- Jockey: Joseph O'Brien
- Trainer: Aidan O'Brien
- Owner: Derrick Smith, Mrs John Magnier, Michael Tabor
- Conditions: Good to Soft

The 2012 2000 Guineas Stakes was the 204th running of the 2000 Guineas Stakes horse race. It was run over one mile at Newmarket Racecourse on 5 May 2013.

== Race details ==
- Sponsor: QIPCO
- Winner's prize money: £226,840
- Going: Good to Sirm
- Number of runners: 18
- Winner's time: 1 minute, 42.46 seconds

== Full result ==
	Dist *	Horse	Jockey	Trainer	SP
1		Camelot	Joseph O'Brien	Aidan O'Brien	15/8 fav
2	nk	French Fifteen	Olivier Peslier	Nicolas Clément	12/1
3	2¼	Hermival	Grégory Benoist	Mikel Delzangles	16/1
4	1¼	Trumpet Major	Richard Hughes	Richard Hannon, Sr.	8/1
5	nse	Coupe De Ville	Paul Hanagan	Richard Hannon, Sr.	66/1
6	2	Fencing	William Buick	John Gosden	25/1
7	½	Ptolemaic	Tom Eaves	Bryan Smart	250/1
8	1½	Abtaal	Christophe Soumillon	Jean-Claude Rouget	7/1
9	nk	Caspar Netscher	Shane Kelly	Alan McCabe	22/1
10	¾	Redact	Jim Crowley	Richard Hannon, Sr.	150/1
11	½	Red Duke	Tom Queally	John Quinn	66/1
12	½	Born To Sea	Johnny Murtagh	John Oxx	10/1
13	¾	Boomerang Bob	Seb Sanders	John Hills	40/1
14	1½	Saigon	Robert Havlin	James Toller	66/1
15	½	Bronterre	Jamie Spencer	Richard Hannon, Sr.	28/1
16	6	Top Offer	James Doyle	Roger Charlton	14/1
17	18	Power	Ryan Moore	Aidan O'Brien	7/1
18	1¼	Talwar	Frankie Dettori	Jeremy Noseda	50/1

* The distances between the horses are shown in lengths or shorter – nk = neck

== Winner details ==
Further details of the winner, Camelot:

- Foaled: 5 March 2009, in Great Britain
- Sire: Montjeu; Dam: Hymn Of The Dawn (Kingmambo)
- Owner: Derrick Smith, Mrs John Magnier, Michael Tabor
- Breeder: Abdullah bin Hamad bin Isa Al Khalifa

== Form analysis ==
=== Two-year-old races ===
Notable runs by the future 2000 Guineas participants as two-year-olds in 2011:

- Camelot - 1st Racing Post Trophy
- French Fifteen - 2nd Prix Thomas Bryon, 1st Critérium International
- Trumpet Major - 2nd Winkfield Stakes, 1st Champagne Stakes
- Coupe De Ville - 1st Stonehenge Stakes
- Fencing - 1st Washington Singer Stakes, 3rd Racing Post Trophy
- Ptolemaic - 2nd Silver Tankard Stakes
- Abtaal - 1st Prix Thomas Bryon
- Caspar Netscher - 3rd Windsor Castle Stakes, 2nd Rose Bowl Stakes, 3rd Richmond Stakes, 1st Gimcrack Stakes, 1st Mill Reef Stakes
- Redact - 2nd Mill Reef Stakes
- Red Duke - 1st Superlative Stakes, 2nd Vintage Stakes
- Born To Sea - 2nd Killavullan Stakes
- Boomerang Bob - 2nd Norfolk Stakes, 2nd Prix du Bois
- Saigon - 1st Rose Bowl Stakes, 3rd Sirenia Stakes, 3rd Mill Reef Stakes, 2nd Horris Hill Stakes
- Bronterre - 1st Stardom Stakes, 4th Dewhurst Stakes
- Power - 1st Marble Hill Stakes, 1st Coventry Stakes, 2nd Phoenix Stakes, 1st National Stakes, 2nd Dewhurst Stakes
- Talwar - 1st Winkfield Stakes, 1st Solario Stakes

=== The road to Newmarket ===
Early-season appearances in 2012, prior to running in the 2000 Guineas:

- French Fifteen – 1st Prix Djebel
- Hermival - 3rd Prix Djebel
- Trumpet Major - 1st Craven Stakes
- Ptolemaic - 4th Craven Stakes
- Abtaal - 2nd Prix Djebel
- Caspar Netscher - 1st Greenham Stakes
- Red Duke - 5th UAE Derby
- Boomerang Bob - 2nd Greenham Stakes
- Bronterre - 3rd Greenham Stakes
- Talwar - 1st International Trial Stakes

=== Subsequent Group 1 wins ===
Group 1 / Grade I victories after running in the 2000 Guineas:

- Camelot – Epsom Derby, Irish Derby (2012)
- Power - Irish 2,000 Guineas (2012)

== Subsequent breeding careers ==
Leading progeny of participants in the 2012 2000 Guineas.

=== Sires of Classic winners ===
Camelot (1st)

- Latrobe - 1st Irish Derby (2018)
- Even So - 1st Irish Oaks (2020)
- Athena - 1st Belmont Oaks (2018)
- Sir Erec - 1st Spring Juvenile Hurdle (2019)

=== Sires of Group/Grade One winners ===
French Fifteen (2nd)

- French King- 1st Grosser Preis von Berlin (2019)
- Sestilio Jet - 1st Prix de Saint-Georges (2019)

=== Other stallions ===
Born To Sea (12th) - Sea Of Grace (2nd Poule d'Essai des Pouliches 2017)
Hermival (3rd) - Minor flat runner - exported to Morocco
Caspar Netscher (9th) - Minor flat runner before returning to training after proving subfertile
