= Clara Bewick Colby =

American journalist

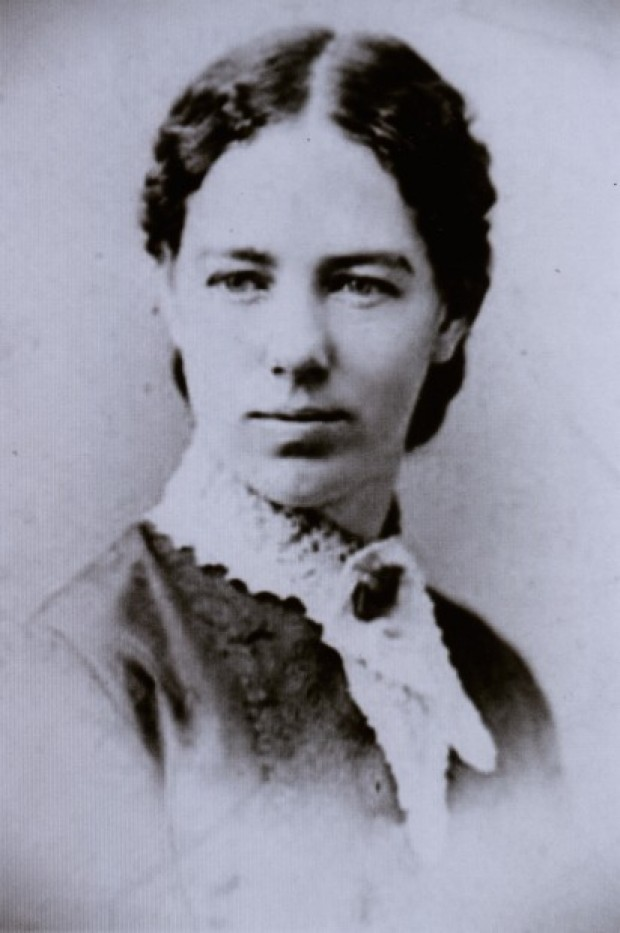
- Born: August 1, 1846; England
- Died: September 7, 1916 (aged 70)
- Occupation: Writer - Journalist

Clara Dorothy Bewick Colby (1 August 1846 – 7 September 1916) was a British-American lecturer, newspaper publisher and correspondent, women's rights activist, and suffragist leader. Born in England, she immigrated to the US, where she attended university and married the former American Civil War general, later Assistant United States Attorney General, Leonard Wright Colby. In 1883, she founded The Woman's Tribune in Beatrice, Nebraska, moving it three years later to Washington, D.C.; it became the country's leading women's suffrage publication. She was an advocate of peace and took part in the great peace conference at San Francisco during the exposition. She also spoke on behalf of the soldiers of the Spanish War. During the Spanish–American War (1898), she was officially appointed as war correspondent, the first woman to be so recognized.

In addition to being a suffragist and newspaper publisher, Colby was a lecturer, an interpreter of Walt Whitman, and a writer. She was a delegate to the International Congress of Women (London, England, 1899); delegated by the governor to represent Oregon in the First International Moral Education Congress (London, 1908); and a delegate to the First International Peace Congress (London, 1911). She served as vice-president of the Nebraska Woman Suffrage Association, from its formation, 1881–1883; and president, 1883–1909. She was corresponding secretary of the Federal Suffrage Association of the United States. Colby wrote magazine articles for Arena, Harper's Bazaar, Overland, Englishwoman, and others. She was a newspaper correspondent for the International Peace Union, Woman's National Press Association, Oregon Woman's Press Association, Higher Thought Center (London), Woman's Freedom League, National Political Reform League, and International Woman's Franchise Club (London). She often appeared before state legislatures and congressional committees on behalf of woman suffrage; she also aided woman suffrage in England.

== Family, education and intellectual development ==
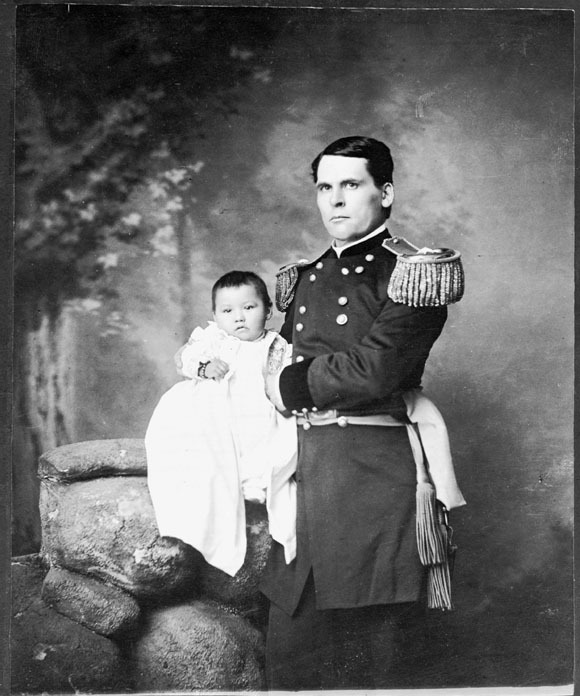
Portrait of General L. W. Colby of Nebraska State Troops holding baby girl, Zintkala Nuni (Little Lost Bird), found on the Wounded Knee Battlefield, South Dakota, 1890

Colby was born in Gloucester, England in 1846, the daughter of Thomas and Clara Willingham (Chilton) Bewick. The family settled near Windsor, Wisconsin when Colby was eight. Being part of a large family, she had few opportunities for attending the district school, but her father encouraged and assisted his children to study in the winter evenings, and in this way she prepared herself to teach in country schools. Colby's grandfather, Thomas Bewick, was a notable naturalist and engraver.

At the age of nineteen, Colby went to Madison, Wisconsin to live with her grandparents, Stephen Chilton and Clara Medhurst Willingham Chilton. Here she entered the University of Wisconsin–Madison, then in its infancy, which was struggling with co-education. She exerted a marked influence in securing the admission of women to the university and the adoption of the principles of co-education in Wisconsin. She was graduated in 1869 as the valedictorian and Phi Beta Kappa in the first class of women graduated from the school. At once, she became a teacher of history and Latin in the institution, while pursuing graduate studies. She married Leonard Wright Colby, a graduate of the same university, in June 1871, and moved to Beatrice the following year, where he was elected to the Nebraska State Senate. Amidst the hardships of pioneer life in a new place, the young wife found her family cares all-absorbing, but her taste for study, her love of literature and her natural desire to improve the conditions about her, led her to establish Beatrice's free public library in 1873.

== Activist ==
Colby edited a department in the Beatrice Express called "Woman's Work," and in 1883, she founded, published, and edited The Woman's Tribune. For several years, she was deeply interested in the movement for woman's enfranchisement, devoting her journal to the advocacy of this reform. The Woman's Tribune took the prize at the Paris Exposition in 1900 for its neatness and workman-like appearance, and it filled an important place in the history of the suffragist cause, being for a time the recognized organ of the National Woman Suffrage Association. A contemporary and friend of Elizabeth Cady Stanton, Susan B. Anthony, and Dr. Mary Edwards Walker, Colby lectured extensively not only to general audiences, but before legislative and congressional committees. In 1888, at the time of the great International Council of Women in Washington, D.C. Colby published the Tribune daily during the week of the council, and continued it through the Woman's Suffrage Convention the following week. It is probably the first instance of a daily woman's paper being published by a woman. During the period of 1885–1898, she served as president of the Nebraska Woman Suffrage Association, and in 1895, she served as the chair of the Federal Suffrage Committee. She spoke in behalf of the soldiers of the Spanish–American War (1898); during the Spanish–American War, she was officially appointed as war correspondent, the first woman to be so recognized. She was also an advocate of peace at the Panama–Pacific International Exposition in San Francisco, California in 1915.

== Lecturer and author ==
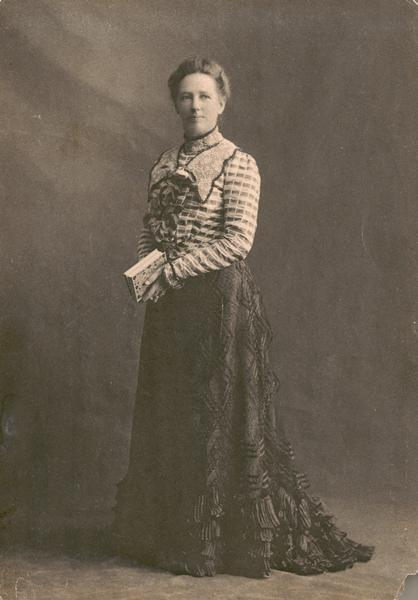
Clara Bewick Colby

With an interest in esoteric spirituality, Colby was a contributor to Stanton's The Woman's Bible (1895). Colby lectured extensively in almost every state in the U.S. as well as in England, Ireland and Scotland, and also gave lectures at Budapest and other places in Europe. She took part in most of the great suffrage campaigns which were carried on in the different states in the effort to secure the franchise by vote of the electors. She made her home in Oregon for a time, taking part in several of the suffrage campaigns of that state. In 1899, she attended the Great International Council of Women held in London. While there Colby made the acquaintance of many distinguished suffrage workers. She served as a delegate to the International Moral Education Congress (London, 1908) and, in the same year, to the International Women Suffrage Alliance (Amsterdam). From the time of the discontinuance of the Tribune in 1909 until 1912, considerable time was spent in England in helping the English suffragists in their struggle for justice and in making acquaintance with many prominent English reformers. Of her experiences in England she published, from time to time, her accounts in the Washington Herald. Among other writings she prepared a book entitled "The History of London" (unpublished), which was preserved by her sister, Dr. Mary B. White of Palo Alto, California. From 1911 through 1913, she served as a delegate to the International Races Congress (London, 1911); International Woman Suffrage Convention (Budapest, 1913); and the International Peace Conference (The Hague, 1913). During the winters of 1913–15, Colby lectured in Washington on topics such as:

- "Delia Blanchflower," Mary Augusta Ward's new woman suffrage novel
- "Austria-Hungary, Its History and Conditions"
- "Florence Nightingale"
- "Women in the Building of America"
- "Woman's Work in English Fiction"
- "Bohemia, and the Burning of John Hus"
- "Euripides, and his Types of Greek Women"
- "The Lion with Seven Darts in His Paw."
- "Hroswitha Who Wrote Dramas a Thousand Years Ago; and Women of the Monasteries"
- "Fanny Burney and Dr. Johnson"
- "Rudolph Eucken, and the New Religious Idealism"

== Personal life ==
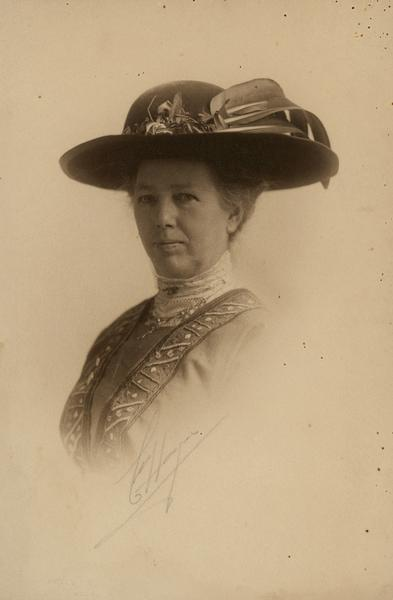
Colby c.1880s

Clara married Leonard in 1872 and they removed to Beatrice, Nebraska. Although they never had children of their own, they adopted a boy, Clarence (born ca. 1882), in 1885 from an Orphan Train. In 1891, Leonard returned home from the Battle of Wounded Knee with a Sioux baby, Zintkala Nuni (Lost Bird) and adopted her; Clara was away at this time, lecturing on suffrage issues. Leonard left with Lost Bird's nursemaid, and the Colbys divorced in 1906. Lost Bird remained under Clara's care but was sent away to Indian Boarding Schools until age 17. A lifelong Congregationalist, Colby nonetheless had an interest in the New Thought spiritual movement; she served as an honorary leadership role in the International New Thought Alliance. Her health faded in her final years, and Colby died at her sister's home in Palo Alto in 1916 of pneumonia and myocarditis. Her ashes were buried in her childhood hometown of Windsor.
