= Paddock, Holt County, Nebraska =

Unincorporated community in Nebraska, U.S.

Coordinates: 42°46′41″N 98°37′08″W

Paddock is an unincorporated community in Holt County, Nebraska, United States.

== History ==
A post office was established at Paddock in the 1870s. It was named for Algernon Paddock, a U.S. Senator from Nebraska. Paddock was the county seat of Holt County from 1876 to 1879.
