= The Paddocks =

Coordinates: 51.6880°N 0.1058°W

The Paddocks, in Crews Hill, Enfield, London, is a farmhouse that is grade II* listed with Historic England. It dates from the first half of the seventeenth century.
