= Emma Curtis Hopkins =

American founder of New thought (1849–1925)

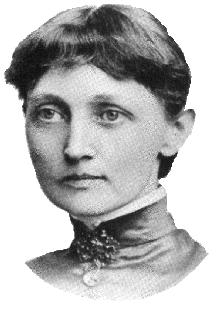
- Portrait of Emma Curtis Hopkins from High Mysticism.
- Born: Josephine Emma Curtis; September 2, 1849; Killingly, Connecticut
- Died: April 8, 1925 (aged 75); Killingly, Connecticut
- Occupation: New Thought teacher
- Known for: Founder of New Thought

Josephine Emma Curtis Hopkins (September 2, 1849 – April 8, 1925) was an American spiritual teacher and leader. She was involved in organizing the New Thought movement and was a theologian, teacher, writer, feminist, mystic, and healer; who taught and ordained hundreds of people, including notably many women. Hopkins was called the "teacher of teachers" and "mother of New Thought" because a number of her students went on to found their own churches or to become prominent in the New Thought Movement, including Charles and Myrtle Fillmore, founders of Unity Church; Ernest Holmes; and H. Emilie Cady, author of Unity's cornerstone text Lessons in Truth. According to Charles S. Braden, Hopkins influenced the development of New Thought "more than any other single teacher", and modern scholars have identified Hopkins as the founder of New Thought.

== Early life ==
Emma Curtis Hopkins was born Josephine Emma Curtis on September 2, 1849 in Killingly, Connecticut, to Rufus and Lydia (née Phillips) Curtis, and was the oldest of nine children. She attended the local Congregationalist church and graduated from the local high school, before going on to teach secondary-school as a math, science, and language teacher. She married George Irving Hopkins, another teacher, on July 19, 1874. The couple had one son, John Carver, who was born June 8, 1875, graduated from the merchant marine academy, and died in 1905. Hopkins and her husband were separated in the mid-1880s and divorced in 1900. Little else is known of Hopkins' early life.

== Career ==
=== Work in Boston with Eddy ===
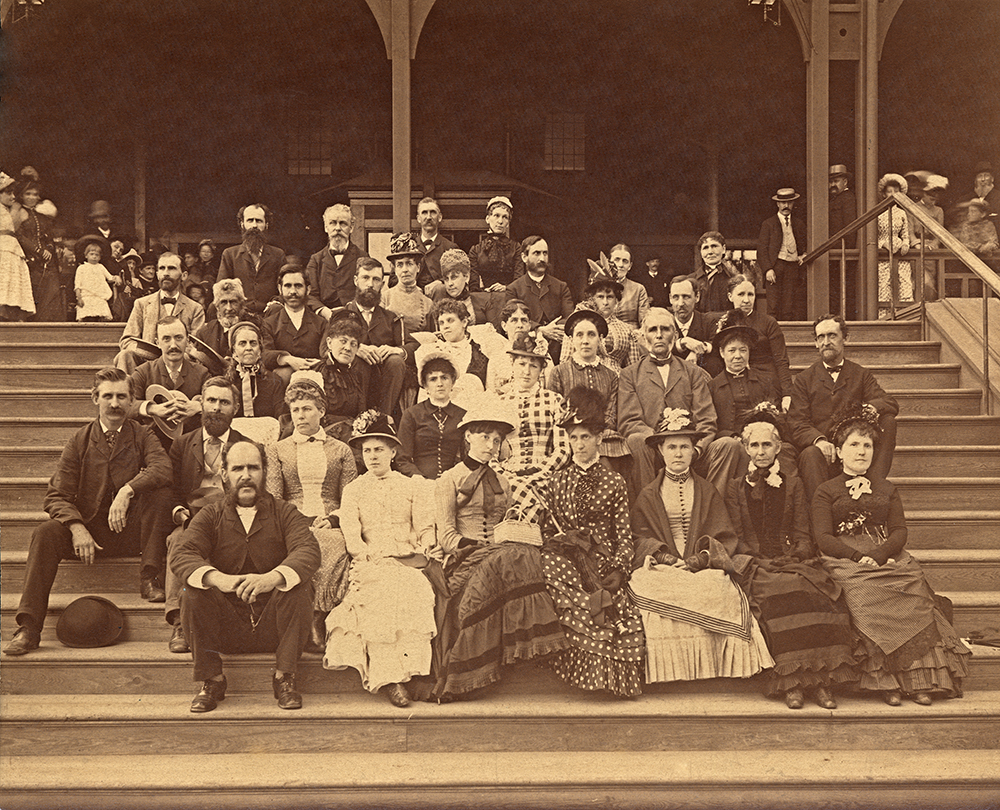
Christian Scientist Association in 1885. Hopkins is in the front row, third from left.

Hopkins first encountered Christian Science in 1881 and, according to J. Gordon Melton, experienced healing of some sort at that time although the details are not known. In 1883, Hopkins heard Mary Baker Eddy speak, and her ideas on spiritual healing interested her, so in December of that year Hopkins joined one of Eddy's classes at the Massachusetts Metaphysical College in Boston for a one-week basic course. Hopkins' name appeared in The Christian Science Journal as a practitioner in February 1884, where it would remain listed until August of that year, when she apparently became too busy with other duties. Her first article in the Journal appeared around the same time. Notably, Eddy never made Hopkins a teacher, nor did Hopkins take the normal class at the Massachusetts Metaphysical College to become one. According to Eddy, Hopkins was not permitted to go farther than the primary class.

In September 1884, Hopkins was invited to become editor of The Christian Science Journal, which around the same time moved from a bi-monthly publication to a monthly one. According to Robert Peel, an article by Hopkins even before her editorship began suggested a trend away from Christian Science and towards a more "indiscriminate eclecticism", drawing from such sources as Buddhism, Upanishads, Islam, Avesta, and Baruch Spinoza. Some writers have claimed that it was only Hopkins' interest in other writers than Eddy, which was expressed in this article, that caused the split between them, but Peel notes that it was after Hopkins had published this article that Eddy made her editor. Hopkins was good at editing according to Peel, and notably opposed former students of Eddy who thought they could teach metaphysics better than she could, writing September 1885:

"No student (I speak from knowledge of facts) has ever yet been qualified to teach Christian Science, except rudimentarily... To me... the words of my teacher on the theme of Spiritual Being were first as the gentle touch of a mother lifting the world-weary form of her wayward child to her bosom. ... I was made to know Him face to face of whom I had heard by the hearing of the ear as a name only. ... I know that every single student that has ever studied under "this teacher sent from God" has realized it all. How great, then, the folly of falling back to earthly ambitions and earthly ends by claiming to work the same miracle — for the pottage reward of a little publicity and a few hundred dollars."

Peel notes that there was a "wry coincidence in the fact that the very month in which these words were published brought to Mrs. Hopkins the irresistible temptation to set herself up in rivalry to the teacher she had so eulogized." Eddy taught a class that September which among its students included Mary H. Plunkett, who had already studied with A. J. Swarts of Chicago, an opponent of Eddy. Upon joining the class, Plunkett began looking for someone to help her set up a rival movement to Eddy, at first trying and failing to win over fellow student Laura Lathrop before moving on to Hopkins. Plunkett and Hopkins quickly became friends, but according to Plunkett it took some time to fully bring Hopkins over to her side and turn her against Eddy. (Note: According to Gillian Gill: "Mary Plunkett cast her friend as a younger, more cultured, purer Mrs. Eddy, and Emma Hopkins accepted the role with increasing confidence.") Eddy was apparently aware of the influence Plunkett was having on Hopkins, and removed Hopkins from the editorial position, replacing her with Sarah H. Crosse. (Note: Around this time Plunkett told the practitioner who had originally healed her and sparked her interest in Christian Science that unless Eddy made Plunkett a teacher and head of the movement everywhere west of Buffalo, she would "sweep [Eddy] off the face of the earth.") She was also asked by Eddy's assistant Calvin Frye to vacate her room at the Massachusetts Metaphysical College; and on November 4 she resigned from the Christian Science Association, although she said she was still devoted to Christian Science. According to Melton, Hopkins broke with Eddy on "ideological and financial grounds." Hopkins wrote to Eddy: "Oh, if you could only have been mental enough to see what I might be and do — and given me time to work past and out of the era through which I was passing when Mrs. Crosse suddenly ordered me to leave."

=== Work in Chicago with Plunkett ===
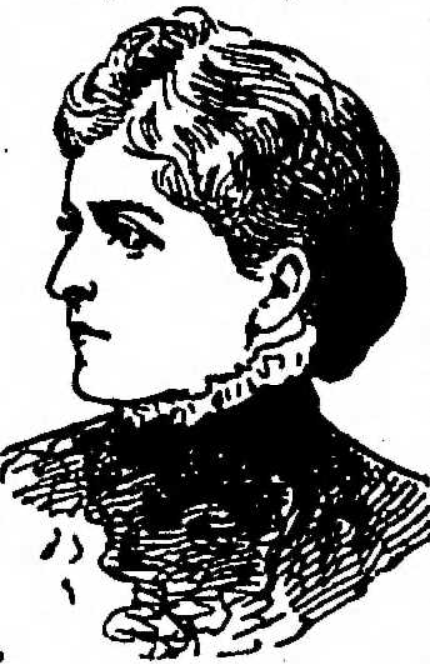
Mary H. Plunkett

By early 1886, Hopkins had moved with Plunkett to Chicago to set up their headquarters and begin teaching. Hopkins' husband, who she later described as having occasional psychotic episodes which could turn violent, also moved to Chicago with her, but she separated from him soon afterwards. At first Hopkins joined up with Plunkett's teacher A. J. Swarts in Chicago (whom she had previously attacked as editor of The Christian Science Journal for plagiarizing Eddy and perverting her writings) and became editor for his magazine, the Mind Cure Journal, until she started work with Plunkett full time. The two women set up their own journal called Truth: A Magazine of Christian Science. They founded the Emma Curtis Hopkins College of Christian Science, with Hopkins acting as teacher and Plunkett as president and business administer. Her College was modeled after Eddy's Massachusetts Metaphysical College; and the first class of thirty-seven students, which included journalist Helen Wilmans, publisher Ida Nichols, and teachers Mabel McCoy and Kate Bingham who would influence the founding of Divine Science, graduated in June 1886 and formed the Hopkins Metaphysical Association.

As word spread, students began traveling to Chicago for classes with Hopkins, and Hopkins traveled with Plunkett to cities such as Milwaukee, San Francisco, Kansas City, New York, and Boston to teach and lecture. (Note: Plunkett would introduce Hopkins to audiences saying "this little woman, so modest in her personality yet so mighty in her powers to teach the great Truth that the rays of Divine Light seem to radiate directly through her.") These classes would often be large, such as a class in San Francisco with around 250 students, or in Boston, where she apparently had around one thousand students. In 1887, there were already twenty-one Hopkins Associations stretched across America. The same year a building was purchased in Chicago's South Side to serve as their headquarters. In addition to the interest in Chicago for Hopkins' metaphysical ideas, the city also offered a vibrant women's movement dating back to the mid-1800s for her to be involved with. Eddy was a supporter of women's rights, and Hopkins had experienced the predominantly female environment of the Christian Science movement, and found this trend repeating itself with her own students and patients in Chicago. She did not want her movement to be dominated by men like the medical profession was, so she took steps to align herself with the women's movement in Chicago.

Hopkins and Plunkett also joined forces for a time with Ursula Newell Gestefeld, another former Christian Scientist and student of Eddy. Hopkins, Plunkett, Swarts, Gestefeld, and others all wanted to set up their own healing methods without so much of a focus on Christianity as Eddy had, either wanting to combine it with eastern religions, or reject it all together. According to Gillian Gill, these groups both opposed Eddy and copied her: "They set up institutes in imitation of her Massachusetts Metaphysical College, founded periodicals comparable to the Christian Science Journal, gave lecture courses modelled on her own, plagiarized shamelessly from her written work, and prominently featured Science and Health in their reading lists. The term Christian Science was used constantly by them." In 1887, Luther Marston organized a convention of these groups in Eddy's home turf of Boston, which in addition to Hopkins and the others in her circle included Julius Dresser, an important figure in the early history of New Thought, and although the participants often disagreed and were in many ways in competition with each other, they were all united by their opposition to Eddy. Reporting on the event in the Truth magazine, a supporter of Hopkins called her "the star that rose in the East and has spread its glory through the West," and Plunkett referred to her as "our beloved leader."

Since at this point so many individuals and groups were claiming to represent Christian Science, some of whom had never even read Eddy's work, she was becoming increasingly concerned over what she saw as false teachers, of which Hopkins was one of the most notable and successful. (Note: At one point she complained to a student: "There are 20 false lecturers and teachers to one that is true".) Eddy had begun teaching Normal classes in 1884 to train her students to teach Christian Science to others, and in 1885 taught four Chicago-based students to teach where Hopkins was. These authorized teachers were encouraged to start their own Christian Science "institutes" and form student associations, and by 1887 there were twenty-three small authorized Christian Science institutes around the country. In the April 1887 issue of The Christian Science Journal, Eddy responded to a question from a reader regarding Hopkins' teaching:

"If one half of what I hear of Mrs. Hopkins teaching on the subject of Christian Science is correct she is deluding the minds she claims to instruct. She took a Primary Course at my College but was not permitted to go farther. She never entered my Normal Class, is not qualified to teach Christian Science and is incapable of teaching it."

=== Break with Plunkett and reorganization ===
Hopkins' organization began experiencing internal problems around 1888, which cost Hopkins the support of many of her students and institutes around the country, and led Hopkins to rethink her strategy and reorder her organization. Plunkett left Hopkins to go to New York and set up a rival organization. When she left, she also took with her the mailing list and other files associated with their work in Chicago. Plunkett renamed their Truth magazine to the International Magazine of Christian Science, setting up the headquarters in New York and absorbing the magazines of two other New Thought publishers at the same time.

While in New York, Plunkett, who by this point already had two children outside of her marriage, met Arthur Bentley Worthington, with whom she had a very public affair. Worthington was a bigamist and embezzler and had several other wives around the country, and the resulting scandal led Hopkins to sever ties completely with her former ally, effectively ending Plunkett's career in the United States New Thought community. Plunkett and Worthington traveled to New Zealand with their children where they established a movement known as Students of Truth, later renamed Temple of Truth, but Worthington later expelled her from the movement and she committed suicide in 1901.

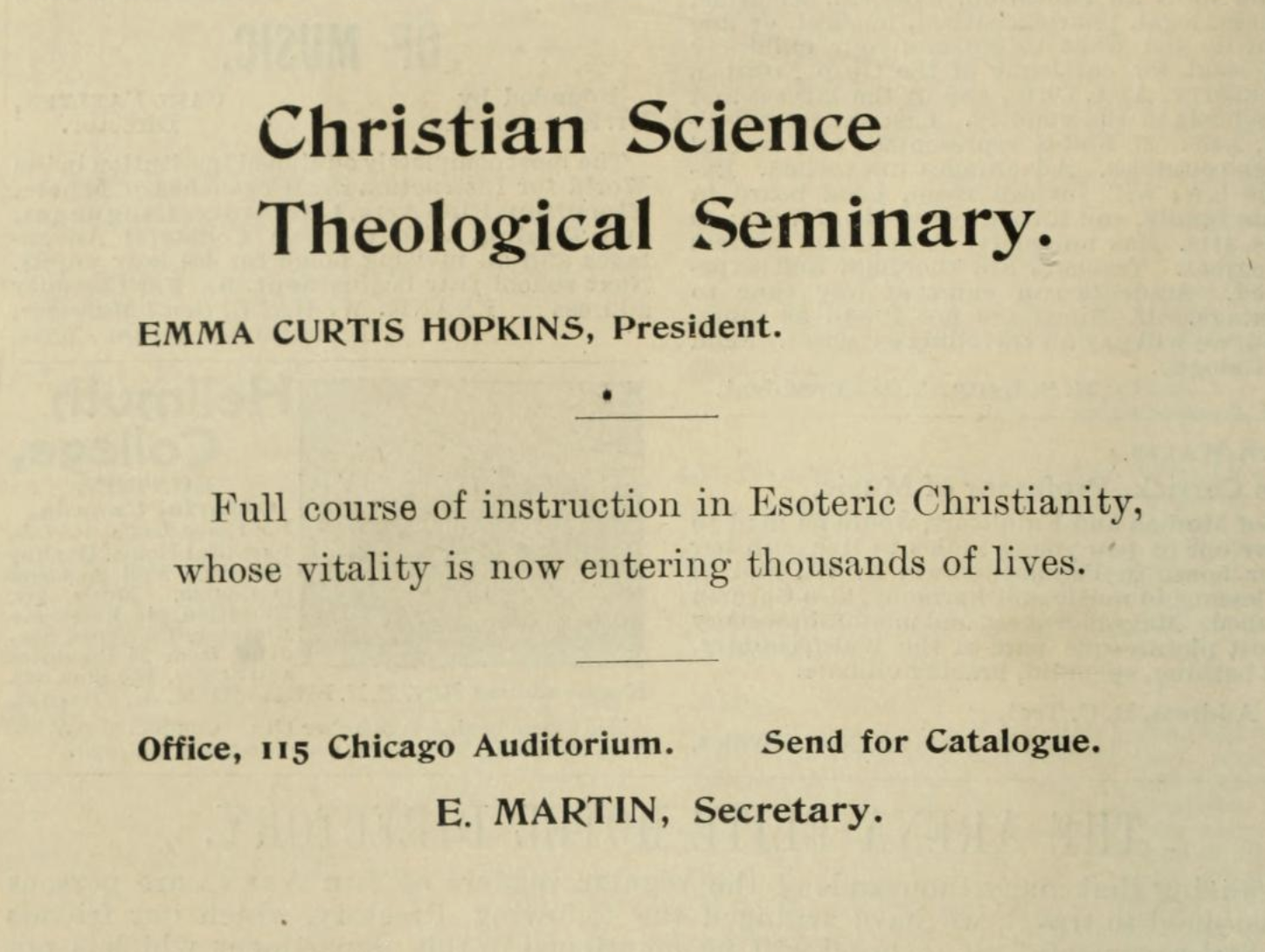
Advertisement for Emma Hopkins' Christian Science Theological Seminary in The Arena c. 1892

Meanwhile, in 1888, Hopkins restructured the Emma Curtis Hopkins College of Christian Science using the Protestant seminary model into the Christian Science Theological Seminary, and taking on the role of bishop she ordained her students for the ministry, becoming, according to J. Gordon Melton, the first woman to ordain others as ministers in modern times. Twenty of the twenty-two students in the first graduating class were also women, and speakers at the ceremony pointed out the significance of the event for women in the religious sphere. (Note: The class graduated in January 1889; and both of the men in the class of twenty-two students were husbands of women also being ordained.) Suffragists were in attendance at the ceremony, and Louise Southworth, an officer in the National Woman Suffrage Association, gave a speech saying that Christian Science "has come at last to give woman her proper status in the world."

Melton writes that Hopkins' College and Seminary were "the seed organizations from which New Thought emerged." Hopkins served as president of the seminary, which by 1893 had trained more than 350 students in the basic course, with over one hundred ordained to the ministry. A course catalogue from that year lists Annie Rix Militz, George Edward Burnell, and Mary Lamereaux Burnell as professors. Basic classes such as hermeneutics were taught by professors other than Hopkins, and the more advanced class such as Theology and Practical Ministry, were taught by Hopkins herself. In 1890s, Hopkins began dispensing with the term "Christian Science", renaming her Christian Science magazine which she had founded a few years earlier the Universal Truth magazine, and renaming her student association the "Truth Students Association". As Hopkins' student established their own organizations, they too would generally try to differentiate themselves from Christian Science, and just as Hopkins had made theological alterations to Eddy teachings, many of her students would make their own variations on Hopkins' original theology.

=== Later life and death ===
In 1895, Hopkins decided her work in Chicago was done successfully and closed the seminary, moving to New York City and leaving trusted students to carry on work in Chicago. She mostly retired from teaching, taking only a few students to teach individually, most notably Ernest Holmes. However she continued to give public lectures, travel, and write. Another notable student was the wealthy socialite and art patron Mabel Dodge Luhan, who would see her for metaphysical treatment three times a week, and referred her artist friends such as Maurice Sterne, Andrew Dasburg, Robert Edmond Jones, and Elizabeth Duncan for treatment as well. In 1918 she was voted the honorary president of the International New Thought Alliance, which had formed a few years earlier in 1914 after a number of failed attempts. (Note: The name "New Thought" had first been suggested in the 1890s as a way to unite the various organizations and churches, and by the beginning of 1914 was the generally accepted designation.)

Hopkins moved from New York to her childhood home in Killingly, Connecticut in 1923, where she died two years later at the age of seventy-five. After her death, her sister Estelle Carpenter took over the organization with assistance from a teacher named Eleanor Mel. A wealthy student of Hopkins' set up an organization to perpetuate Hopkins' teachings, buying a large farm in Connecticut called Joy Farm.

== Theology ==
Although originally teaching under the label of Christian Science, which caused a good deal of confusion, Hopkins' theology increasingly differed from that of Eddy, and she eventually abandoned even the term Christian Science in favor of the name New Thought. In her 1888 book Scientific Christian Mental Practice, Hopkins used a number of philosophies and religions to support her arguments, including Plotinus, Plato, Baruch Spinoza, Augustine of Hippo, Ralph Waldo Emerson, The Buddha, Thomas Carlyle, and the Avesta, but notably did not acknowledge Eddy as a source for her ideas. Hopkins told students that if they read Eddy's book Science and Health with Key to the Scriptures, some parts could be skipped, such as a chapter on atonement. Hopkins and New Thought as a whole (with some exceptions such as John Gaynor Banks) moved increasingly away from an emphasis on Christianity, seeing universal truth in all religions; and Robert Peel writes that Hopkins herself was "more at home with the Hindu Upanishads than with the Christian Gospels." However, Hopkins was not as antagonistic towards Christianity as her partners Plunkett and Swarts were, who privately disparaged Christianity while at the same time giving lip service to it in public.

Hopkins did share some theological points with Eddy, for instance teaching that God was not anthropomorphic. Both Eddy and Hopkins protested against the doctrine of the fall of man, they believed that the only reality was spiritual, that there was no power apart from God, that sickness did not originate with God, and that healing comes in understanding this. Like Eddy, Hopkins used capitalized synonyms to explain the nature of God such as Mind, Truth, Principle, and Love; but added additional synonyms such as Health, Support, Defense, and Protection. She followed Eddy's lead in calling God both Father and Mother, but developed the concept in ways Eddy did not. J. Gordon Melton writes that the "clearest presentation" of her new theological framework is seen in her writings on the Trinity, which replaced the Holy Spirit with the Mother. Hopkins adopted a form of the Trinity similar to that of Joachim of Fiore, and posited that God manifested differently through different periods of history, as God the Father first, then as Jesus, and finally as Mother Spirit which correlated with a rise of women. (Note: Eddy meanwhile kept the traditional framework of the Trinity as "Father, Son, and Holy Ghost"; even though she called God both Father and Mother.) Hopkins also saw the Holy Spirit / Mother Comforter in terms of the Shekinah. She saw women's increasing involvement in the world as proof of her ideas, and saw herself, and the women she ordained, as messengers of the new era of the holy Mother Spirit. It is likely because of this theology that Hopkins was a strong supporter of secular women's issues, and encouraged her association members to join women's groups such as the Woman's Federal Labor Union. Beryl Satter calls Hopkins' writings "convoluted and ambiguous", but acknowledges that her theology was still able to elevate women through development of traditionally "masculine" qualities such as strength and power.

Hopkins, and New Thought as a whole, developed an emphasis on prosperity theology which was absent from Christian Science. Hopkins often referred to prosperity, and believed Jesus taught it as an acknowledgement "of the presence of God."

== Founder of New Thought ==
Modern scholars assert that Hopkins is the founder of the New Thought movement, which by 1902 had over one million adherents. According to J. Gordon Melton, "Hopkins laid the foundations of the New Thought metaphysical tradition in American religion" and "the most significant New Thought organizations, the Unity School of Christianity, Divine Science, and Religious Science, can be traced directly to her". According to Charles S. Braden, Hopkins influenced New Thought "more than any other single teacher". She also became an important feminist figure for ordaining female ministers, a rarity for the time; as well as a proponent of the idea of a female Divine, although she did not originate the idea. Despite her influence, by the 1990s Hopkins had largely been forgotten even within the New Thought movement according to modern scholars. Gail Harley identified a number of reasons for this, including controversies surrounding her life, disputes with former students, lack of self reflection in the New Thought movement, dismissal by the mainstream religious community, and her exclusion from the only history of the movement produced in the early 20th century.

== Influence ==
Hopkins has been called the "Teacher of teachers" in New Thought circles, and according to Gail Harley taught "every founder of a significant New Thought ministry". Charles S. Braden states that her student list "reads like a Who's Who among New Thought leaders." She also taught a number of suffragists and social activists in the women's movement. Among those who studied directly with Hopkins were:

- John Gaynor Banks, Episcopal priest who sought to merge Hopkins theories back into mainstream Christianity and founded the International Order of St. Luke the Physician
- Charles and Josephine Barton, editor of The Life, a New Thought magazine
- Kate Bingham, New Thought teacher who taught Nona L. Brooks
- George and Mary Burnell, founders of the New Thought Burnell Foundation in Los Angeles
- H. Emilie Cady, author of Lessons in Truth, an important Unity Church text
- Lucinda Banister Chandler, social reformer and author
- Clara Bewick Colby, lecturer, newspaper publisher and correspondent, women's rights activist
- Malinda Cramer, founder of Divine Science
- Abby Morton Diaz, women's rights organizer
- Charles and Myrtle Fillmore, co-founders of the Unity Church
- Elizabeth Boynton Harbert, author and suffragist
- Ernest Holmes, founder of Religious Science; Ordained in Divine Science
- Frances Lord, New Thought author and teacher in England
- Mabel Dodge Luhan, wealthy arts patron associated with the Taos art colony
- Mabel McCoy, New Thought teacher
- Annie Rix Militz, founder of Home of Truth, and her sister Harriet Hale Rix
- Louisa Southworth, suffragist involved with The Woman's Bible
- Clara Stocker, teacher and founder of Church of the Truth
- Alice Bunker Stockham, fifth woman to become a doctor in the United States
- Elizabeth Towne, New Thought writer, editor, and publisher
- Sara A. Underwood, suffragist
- Helen Van Anderson, Founder of the Church of the Higher Life
- Ella Wheeler Wilcox, a New Thought poet
- Helen Wilmans, Journalist and New Thought publisher
- Jane Yarnall, New Thought teacher in St. Louis

Notable students of Hopkins' students include, among others, Nona L. Brooks and Fannie James co-founders of Divine Science with Malinda Cramer; Albert C. Grier founder of Church of the Truth with Clara Stocker; Emmet Fox, Divine Science minister and author in New York City through the Great Depression; Florence Scovel Shinn, Unity teacher and author in New York City; Louise Hay, author and founder of Hay House; William Walker Atkinson, prolific New Thought author; and Michael Bernard Beckwith, author and founder of Agape International Spiritual Center in Los Angeles.

According to scholar Deidre Michell, many Christians have embraced aspects of Hopkins' theology without recognizing its origin. Prosperity theology, which at least partially came out of Hopkins' teachings and New Thought in general, has influenced numerous authors, speakers, and televangelists; and helped give rise to movements such as Pentecostalism and Word of Faith.

== Bibliography ==
(This is a partial list of her work. References from www.worldcat.org and Google Books )

- A golden promise. Publisher: Pittsfield, Mass. : Sun Print. [192-]
- According to thy faith. Baccalaureate address. Bible ...
- All is divine order. Publisher: Pittsfield, Mass. : Sun Printing, 1925.
- Awake thou that sleepest. Publisher: Pittsfield, Mass. : Sun Print. [192-?]
- Bible instruction series.
- Bible interpretations. These Bible interpretations were given during the early nineties at the Christian Science theological seminary at Chicago, Illinois. Publisher: (Pittsfield, Mass., Sun Printing Co., 1925)
- Bible interpretation from the book of Job : in three lessons. Publisher: Roseville, Calif. : High Watch Fellowship, [19--]
- Bible Interpretations Series 1–14;
- Bible Lessons 1-35.
- Bible Lessons 1925.
- Bible lesson 1927.
- Bible lesson, no. 1. Publisher: Pittsfield, Mass. : Sun Printing, 1925–1927.
- Bible lessons. Publisher: Pittsfield, Mass., Sun Printing Co., 1925
- But one substance. Publisher: Pittsfield, Mass. : Sun Print. [192-?]
- Christ at Samaria. Publisher: Pittsfield, Mass. : Sun Printing, 1925.
- Christian mysticism and the victorious life : first study, the sacred edict and estoric discipline. Publisher: Baltimore : Williams & Wilkins Co., 1914.
- Class lessons, 1888. Publisher: Marina del Rey, Calif. : DeVorss, 1977.
- Continue the work. Publisher: Pittsfield, Mass. : Sun Print., 1925.
- Drops of gold. Publisher: Roseville, CA : High Watch Fellowship, 1970.
- Emma Curtis Hopkins 2011. This is a reproduction of a book published before 1923.
- Esoteric Philosophy Deeper Teachings in Spiritual Science. Publisher: Vancouver, WA: WiseWoman Press, ISBN 0945385218, 2009
- Esoteric philosophy in spiritual science.
- First lesson in Christian Science. Publisher: [S.l., 1888]
- For unto us a child is born. Publisher: Marina Del Rey, CA : DeVorss & Co. Publishers, [199-?]
- The Genesis Series. Publisher: Vancouver, WA: WiseWoman Press, 2019
- God and man are One. Publisher: Pittsfield, Mass. : Sun Print. [192-?]
- High mysticism. Publisher: New York : E.S. Gorham, 1924.
- High mysticism : a series of twelve studies in the inspirations of the sages of the ages. Publisher: Philadelphia, Harper Prtg. Co., 1920–22.
- High mysticism : studies in the wisdom of the sages of the ages. Publisher: Cornwall Bridge, Conn. : Emma Curtis Hopkins Fund, 1928–35.
- High mysticism : a series of twelve studies in the wisdom of the sages of the ages. Publisher: Santa Monica, Calif. : DeVorss, 1974.
- High mysticism : studies in the wisdom of the sages of the ages. Publisher: Vancouver, WA: WiseWoman Press, 2008
- How to attain your good. Publisher: Kansas City, MO. : Unity Tract Society, [1898-1914]
- Jesus and Judas. Publisher: Pittsfield, Mass. : Sun Print. [19--]
- Judgment series in spiritual science. Publisher: Alhambra [Calif.] : School of Christ Teaching Sanctuary of Truth, [19--]
- Judgment series in spiritual science. Publisher: Vancouver, WA: WiseWoman Press, 2008
- Justice of Jehovah. Publisher: Pittsfield, Mass. : Sun Printing [19--]
- Magic of His name. Publisher: Pittsfield, Mass. : Sun Printing, 1927.
- Pamphlets. Publisher: Cornwall Bridge, Conn. : High Watch Fellowship, [1945]
- Résumé : practice book for the twelve chapters in High mysticism - first sent forth in 1892. Publisher: Cornwall Bridge Conn. : Emma Curtis Hopkins Fund, 1928.
- Scientific Christian mental practice : founded upon the instruction of Emma Curtis Hopkins : lesson two, "Denials of science.". Publisher: [S.l. : s.n., 19--]
- Scientific Christian mental practice. Publisher: Santa Monica, Calif. : De Vorss, 1974.
- Scientific Christian mental practice, founded upon the instruction of Emma Curtis Hopkins. Lesson one "The statement of being." Publisher: [Seattle, Metaphysical News, 193-?]
- Scientific Christian Mental Practice. Publisher: Cosimo Inc 2009.
- Self treatment. Publisher: Roseville, Calif. : High Watch Fellowship, [19--]
- Self treatments, including the Radiant I Am..Publisher: Vancouver, WA: WiseWoman Press, 2007
- Sixth lesson in Christian Science : from the private lessons. Publisher: Chicago : Purdy Pub. Co., [1887?]
- Spiritual law in the natural world. Publisher: Chicago, Purdy Pub. Co., 1894.
- Studies in high mysticism : the magia Jesu Christi. IV. Faith. Publisher: Baltimore : Williams & Wilkins, 1924.
- Teachings of Emma Curtis Hopkins. Publisher: Cornwall Bridge, Conn. : High Watch Foundation, [19--]
- Tenth lesson in Christian science. Publisher: Chicago : Christian Science Publishing Co., 1891.
- The bread of life Publisher: Pittsfield, Mass. : Sun Print., 1925.
- The chief thought. Publisher: Pittsfield, Mass. : Sun Print., 1925.
- The gospel series in spiritual science : an uncovering of the mystic connection that underlies your own true relation with God as Christ, your own eternal self, through these lessons, you come into a fuller, richer, expression of life not dependent upon the accident of opportunity. Publisher: Alhambra, CA : School of Christ Teaching, Sanctuary of Truth, [1976?]
- The Gospel Series: Uncovering the Mystical Connection .Publisher: Vancouver, WA: WiseWoman Press, 2017
- The key to power. Publisher: Kansas City, MO. : Unity Book Company, 1895, 1894.
- The ministry of the Holy Mother. Publisher: Cornwall Bridge, Conn. : Emma Curtis Hopkins Fund
- The radiant I am. Publisher: Cornwall Bridge, Conn. : High Watch Fellowship
- The real kingdom. Publisher: Pittsfield, Mass. : Sun Print., 1925.
- The resurrection of Christ. Publisher: Kansas City, MO. : Unity Book Company, 1893.
- Two great lessons. Publisher: Alhambra, Calif. : Sanctuary of Truth, 1977.
- Who are drunkards. This Bible interpretation was given during the early nineties at the Christian Science Theological Seminary at Chicago, Illinois. Publisher: Pittsfield, Ma., Sun Printing Co. [n.d.]
- Your idea of God. Publisher: Pittsfield, Mass. : Sun Printing, 1927.

== Footnotes ==
=== Sources ===
- Braden, Charles S. (1963). Spirits in Rebellion: the Rise and Development of New Thought. Southern Methodist University Press. ISBN 978-0870740251.
- Gill, Gillian (1998). Mary Baker Eddy. Perseus Books. ISBN 978-0-7382-0042-2.
- Harley, Gail M. (2001). Schultz, Rima Lunin; Hast, Adele (eds.). Women Building Chicago 1790-1990: A Biographical Dictionary. Indiana University Press. ISBN 0-253-33852-2.
- Harley, Gail M. (2002). Emma Curtis Hopkins: Forgotten Founder of New Thought. Syracuse University Press. ISBN 0-8156-2933-8. OCLC 606778962.
- Melton, J. Gordon (1993). "Emma Curtis Hopkins: A Feminist of the 1880s and Mother of New Thought". In Wessinger, Catherine (ed.). Women's Leadership in Marginal Religions: Explorations Outside the Mainstream. Urbana: University of Illinois Press. ISBN 978-0-252-06332-9.
- Melton, J. Gordon (2009). Melton's Encyclopedia of American Religions (eighth ed.). Gale Cengage Learning.
- Michell, Deidre (2002). "New Thinking, New Thought, New Age: The Theology and Influence of Emma Curtis Hopkins (1849-1925)". Counterpoints: The Flinders University Online Journal of Interdisciplinary Conference Papers. 2 (1): 6–18.
- Peel, Robert (1971). Mary Baker Eddy: The Years of Trial, 1876-1891. Holt, Rinehart and Winston. ISBN 0-87510-117-8.
