= James Dillet Freeman =

American poet and minister of the Unity Church (1912–2003)

James Dillet Freeman (March 20, 1912 – April 9, 2003) was a poet and a minister of the Unity Church, a New Thought denomination. Freeman was born Abraham Freedman according to his Delaware Birth Certificate in Wilmington, Delaware but began using the name James very early. His father was Jacob Freedman, who was Jewish and emigrated from Eastern Europe in 1896. James' mother was Sarah Esther Elberson, who was born in New Jersey, 1890. In the mid-1920s Sarah, James and his sister Rose moved to Kansas City, MO, where James eventually went to work at the Unity School as a clerk. It was sometime after 1958 that James began using the pen name, James Dillet Freeman.

Freeman was sometimes referred to as the "poet laureate to the Moon" because his poems were twice brought to the Moon, "a distinction he shares with no other author." His 1941 "Prayer for Protection" was taken aboard Apollo 11 in July 1969 by Lunar Module pilot Buzz Aldrin, and a microfilm of Freeman's 1947 "I Am There" was left on the Moon by James B. Irwin on Apollo 15. Freeman received the inspiration to write 'I Am There' during the cancer treatment and subsequent death of his first wife [married 26 October 1934] Lucy Katherine Gilwee [October 2, 1907 - Sept 13, 1948].

Freeman's poems include "Blessings for a Marriage" and "The Traveller." The latter poem was written after one of Freeman's friends had died.

Freeman wrote a history of Unity School of Christianity [now known as Unity World Headquarters], The Story of Unity, which includes biographies of Myrtle and Charles Fillmore. The fourth edition was published in 2000. The flaps of the jacket for this book provides a portrait of James Dillet Freeman and further insights about his life and work for Unity. "His affiliation with Unity School of Christianity began in 1929, at the invitation of Unity cofounder Myrtle Fillmore. Rev. Freeman served as director of Unity's ministerial program for twenty years. He also served as director of Silent Unity ... was a member of the Board Trustees and first vice president of Unity School." He retired in 1984.

While James Dillet Freeman worked for Silent Unity and was a writer for the Unity magazine called Daily Word for most of his adult life, he proudly proclaimed on many occasions that he never joined a specific Unity church, reveling in his independent nature and personifying a spirit present throughout Unity and the New Thought Movement. He was, however, given an honorary Unity ordination in 1944 and then earned a Unity ordination in 1966. Freeman became a millionaire from his prolific writings. Many of his poems and affirmations were sold to major card companies such as Hallmark.

Freeman's second wife was Vallie May Rey Rhea [aka Billie] and they married on March 23, 1951. She experienced Alzheimer's disease for ten years before passing in 1993. [May 11, 1911-Jan 29, 1993] James Dillet Freeman wrote many moving articles about Vallie's battle with the illness. He and Vallie had no children.

James married Virginia Love after his 2nd wife's passing and they visited Oahu, Hawaii soon after, enjoying homemade chocolate chip cookies fresh from the oven of Wally Amos. They enjoyed the company of Unity Minister Bob Wasner, his wife Mary June and a few other members of Windward Unity Church including Mike and Donna Stott.

James died April 9, 2003. He was 91 years old.
