= Spirits in Rebellion =

Spirits in Rebellion: The Rise and Development of New Thought (1963) by Charles S. Braden is a book on the history of the New Thought movement.

The book follows the rise of the New Thought movement and explores groups such as the International New Thought Alliance, Unity Church, the Church of Divine Science, and Religious Science. The book is divided into four parts: the nature of New Thought, various groups in the United States, leaders and their periodicals, and the movement in other countries. This last part includes the spread of New Thought in England, as well as the movement during the Nazi regime in Germany. Time is also spent exploring Mary Baker Eddy's conflict with New Thought.

After the book was published in 1963, Arthur W. Munk wrote that "it probably constitutes the best available source on New Thought and related movements." However, Robert T. Handy wrote at the same time that the book was "generally friendly to New Thought" and that the "movement and its leaders are dealt with in largely uncritical terms", but "disruptions, rivalries, hostilities" are played down or not discussed at all. After the publication of Spirits in Rebellion, there were no significant scholarly works on New Thought until interest began to renew in the 1980's. At that time, in 1987, Richard S. Taylor called Braden's work "the standard account of New Thought's organizational history."

More recently however, Braden has been criticized by scholars for mostly overlooking Emma Curtis Hopkins' importance as the founder of New Thought, outside of an acknowledgement of her as the "teacher's teacher". Beryl Satter also noted in 1999 that Braden's work, along with Horatio Dresser's A History of the New Thought Movement, which Braden relies heavily on, were "two institutional histories that uncritically portray New Thought as an idealistic and spiritually oriented faith". In 2000, Catherine L. Albanese called the work "somewhat dated" but comprehensive. According to Kevin Shopf in 2018, "Braden’s work is based largely on Dresser's uncritical and biased scholarship. While Braden’s work is still of great value to the study of New Thought, it should be kept in mind that the sources that Braden utilized were uncritical and that Braden himself was probably not as critical as he should have been."

Much of the materials collected for the book by Braden are now available to scholars at the Bridwell Library of Southern Methodist University's Perkins School of Theology.
