= H. Emilie Cady =

American homeopathic physician and New Thought author

- Born: Harriet Emilie Cady; July 12, 1848; Dryden, New York, U.S.
- Died: January 3, 1941 (aged 92); Manhattan, New York City, U S.
- Occupations: Physician, author
- Parent(s): Oliver Barlow Cady; Cornelia A. Philips

Harriet Emilie Cady (September 12, 1848 – January 3, 1941) was an American homeopathic physician and author of New Thought spiritual writings. Her 1896 book Lessons in Truth: A Course of Twelve Lessons in Practical Christianity is now considered one of the core texts on Unity Church teachings. It has sold over 1.6 million copies since its first publication.

== Biography ==
Cady was born on September 12, 1848, in Dryden, New York, to Oliver Barlow Cady and Cornelia A. (Philips) Cady.

Her first job was as a schoolteacher in a one-room schoolhouse in her hometown. In the late 1860s, she decided to pursue the field of medicine, and enrolled in the Homeopathic Medical College of the State of New York. She graduated in 1871 and became one of the first woman physicians in America.

=== Spiritual development and writing career ===
Introduced to the teachings of Albert Benjamin Simpson, Cady became deeply involved in spiritual and metaphysical studies. She was inspired and influenced by Biblical teachings and the philosophy of Ralph Waldo Emerson. She was taught by Emma Curtis Hopkins, the New Thought "teacher of teachers" and a student of Christian Science and Mary Baker Eddy.

Cady associated with several prominent figures in the New Thought movement of the time, including: Emma Curtis Hopkins, Divine Science minister Emmet Fox, Ernest Holmes, founder of Religious Science, and Charles and Myrtle Fillmore, co-founders of Unity Church. Finding The Christ in Ourselves, a pamphlet she had written and sent unsolicited to Charles and Myrtle Fillmore, was published by them in the October 1891 issue of Thought. Beginning in 1892, a series of articles titled "Lessons in Truth" by Dr. Cady were published in Unity magazine. This material later was compiled into a book and was among the first books Unity published.

=== Death ===
Cady died January 3, 1941, in Manhattan, New York City, aged 92.

== Published works ==
- Lessons in Truth: A Course of Twelve Lessons in Practical Christianity. (Unity Magazine articles 1894–5, collected 1896); ISBN 1-4515-9726-6.
- How I Used Truth. (1916); ISBN 1-5960-5538-3 (Formerly published as Miscellaneous Writings, retitled in 1939; revised 1986)
- God, A Present Help. (1908); ISBN 0-8715-9044-1.
- Complete Works of H. Emilie Cady. Edited by Michael A. Maday. Introduction by Russell H. Kemp (1975). Afterword by Ernest C. Wilson (1979). Unity Village, MO: Unity House, 1995; ISBN 0871592894.
