= Swami Vivekananda in California =

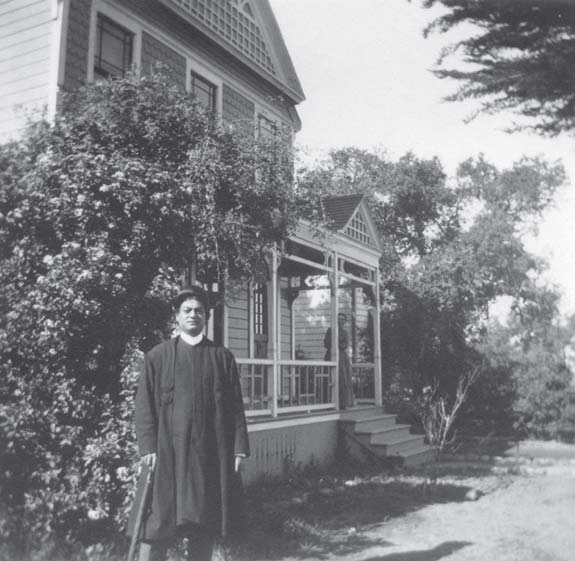
Vivekananda at Mead sisters house, South Pasadena, California

Swami Vivekananda, the 19th-century Indian monk, came to Los Angeles, California in 1899 during his second visit to the West. His oratorical skills and presentation of Hindu religious tenets and comparison with other religious beliefs made him a celebrity among a wide spectrum of American audience. Between 1893—1897 and 1899–1902, he traveled widely in the US lecturing on a wide range of subjects and also established Vedanta Centers. There are such centers in many cities in the US, including many centers in California. In 1899, after delivering lectures in New York, he travelled to the western part of the United States and reached Los Angeles via Chicago. He then went on to deliver lectures in California at Oakland, San Francisco and Alameda.

== Lectures ==
Vivekananda traveled to California during his second visit to the West. Vivekananda reached California on 3 December 1899 where he was received at the railway station by Josephine MacLeod, met Miss Spencer and stayed with her as a guest. Miss Spencer was living in California with her aged, blind mother. She became his disciple. Miss Josephine MacLeod, a friend and disciple of Vivekananda, welcomed him to California.

From 3 December 1899 to 30 May 1900 when he left for Chicago he conducted a series of lectures and private classes in California. He was hosted by many American disciples such as; Miss Spencer, Roxie Blodget, Stimsons and Emeline Bowler in Los Angeles; by J. MacLeod et al. at Mount Lowe; by Mead sisters at South Pasadena; at Oakland and Almeda in the Home of Truth by a friend; by A. Hansbrough and Dr. M. Logan in San Francisco and Camp Tylor; and by Dr. Albert Hiller at Mount Shasta, for different periods. During this nearly 6 months period of stay in California he delivered 62 lectures, gave 12 formal and informal talks and also held 8 lecture classes to disciples at his place of stay. His first lecture in this series was on 8 December at Blachard Hall, 233 S Broadway, LA, in which he discussed on "Vedanta Philosophy" or "Hinduism as a religion".

He gave lectures on the concept of “The way to the Realization of the Universalization of a Universal Religion” and on “Christ, the Messenger”. Vivekananda interpreted Jesus from the point of view of Vedantic enunciations. He opined that Jesus was a Yogi. He spent a month at the "Home of Truth" and noted that of all Americans, “Californians are specially fit to understand the raja-yoga of intuitive meditation which he labeled Applied Psychology”. Thereafter, many Vedanta centers were founded in the northern part of California under the stewardship of C.F. Patterson. To keep up with the pace of development he recalled Turiyananda one of his disciples to California.

During the time he stayed in Los Angeles, Vivekananda was given a large area of land by one of his devotees, which was a forested hilly terrain about 12 miles from Lick Observatory, an area of 160 acres, in Northern California, to build a Vedanta retreat to house students. He called it Peace retreat or Santi Asrama. His brother disciple Turiyananda was called to inspect the land and develop the center in San Francisco. He, thereafter, trained students here in the art of “meditation and austere monastic life of India.” for next two years.

After lecturing in Los Angeles, Vivekananda went to San Francisco. He then lectured students for three months in San Francisco, Oakland, and Alameda. On the urgings of students from the areas around San Francisco Bay, urged Vivekananda to set up an institution that could be run to keep the study of Vedanta going even after Vivekananda's departure from the US. It was then on 14 April 1900 that Vivekananda, after his evening lecture, established the Vedanta Society with the objective of "assisting Swami Vivekananda in his work in India and studying Vedanta Philosophy." Vivekananda then decided to bring in his disciple to run the institution.

== Memorial House ==
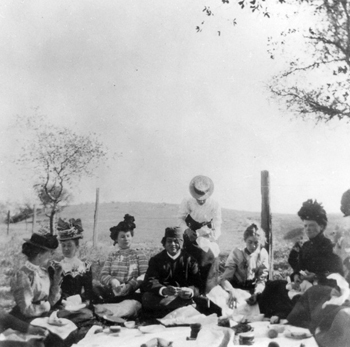
Vivekananda in California in January 1900 amidst his devotees and friends

In South Pasadena, in 1900, Vivekananda gave eight lectures. Here, he stayed as a guest in the house of Meade sisters the —Carrie, Helen, and Alice—in Pasadena, his disciples, for 8 weeks. Alice Mead Hansbrough had heard Vivekananda's lecture on 8 December 1900 and was influenced by his Vedantic teachings. He later helped Vivekananda to establish the Vedanta Society at Pasadena and also at Los Angeles. This house has been converted into a "Vivekananda House" as a memorial where the bedroom used by Vivekananda is now a meditation room, the kitchen, the dining room with the table used by him, the parlor where he spoke are all preserved. It also houses the Vedanta Society of South Pasadena.

== Influence ==
Vivekananda was invited to be a "Visiting Faculty” of Hindu Studies and the Dharma Civilization Foundation Chair in the University of Southern California.

== Anecdotes ==
An anecdote mentioned of Vivekananda's visit to Los Angeles is that after giving an erudite lecture, a devotee saw him eating peanuts and was mesmerized by his simplicity.

In northern California while cooking his meal for dinner, he concurrently delivered a lecture on philosophy, and in particular gave a verbatim narration of the eighteenth chapter of the Bhagavat Gita, which was one of his memorable talks.

Another anecdote mentioned is about Vivekananda's regular habit of not eating any meal before delivering his lectures, as he had noted that a lecture delivered on an empty stomach improved clarity of presentation. However, one exception was of him eating dates for dessert during a dinner hosted by Mrs Steele and delivering a lecture after dinner. The lecture delivered by him after eating dates was considered a “scintillating oratory”.
