= Ummas =

UMMAS (Unity Ministers of the Mid-Atlantic States) is a voluntary association of Unity Ministers, Spiritual Leaders, and their spouses and partners in North Carolina, South Carolina, Georgia, Tennessee, and Alabama. UMMAS is a sub-region of Southeast Unity, one of the regional associations of churches affiliated with The Association of Unity Churches and Unity Worldwide Ministries.

== UMMAS events ==
- UMMAS sponsors a 4-day Annual Retreat for laypeople and ministers from the southeast and beyond, held in early fall at Kanuga Conference Center near Hendersonville, North Carolina.
- UMMAS holds a 2-day Training & Networking session for board members and ministers from UMMAS churches, usually in mid-July.
- UMMAS holds quarterly meetings of member ministers & spouses/partners in ministry for networking, brainstorming, "heart-check" (personal support), fellowship, mentoring, networking, and planning our events.
