= Church unity =

Church unity may refer to:

- The unity of the church, one of the Four Marks of the Church
- The unity of the church expressed in Ecumenism
- The goal of Church union

== See also ==
- Unity Church
