= Abby Morton Diaz =

American writer

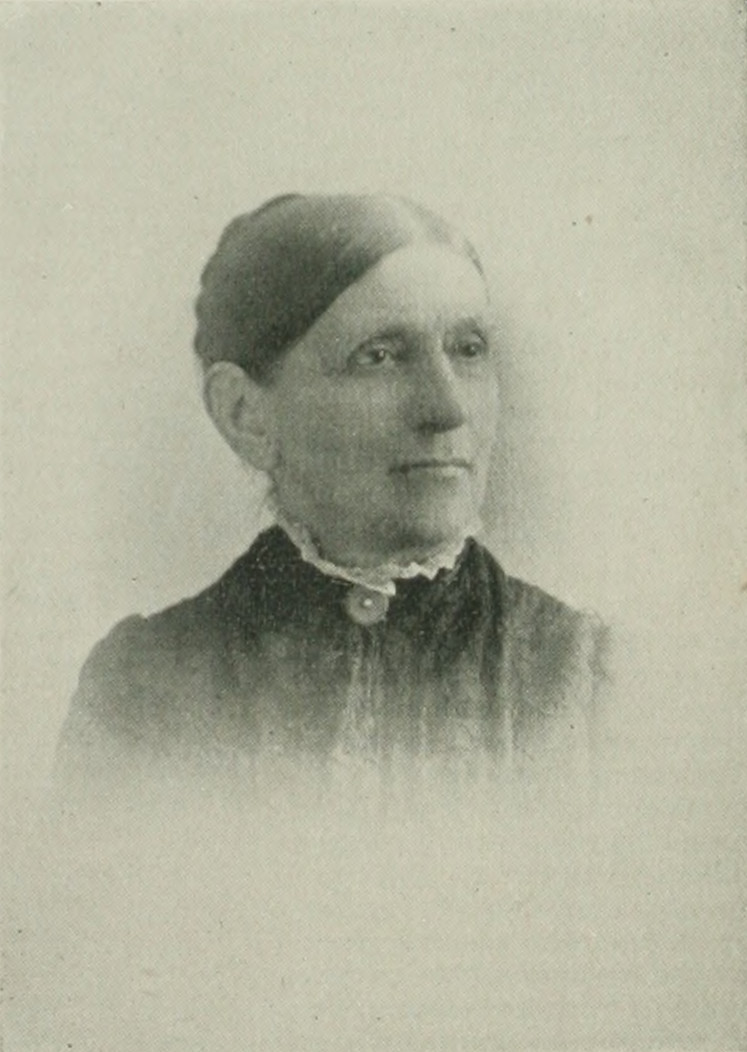
- Photo in A Woman of the Century
- Born: Abby Morton; November 22, 1821; Plymouth, Massachusetts
- Died: April 1, 1904 (aged 82); Belmont, Massachusetts
- Occupations: Teacher, reformer, writer

Abby Morton Diaz (November 22, 1821 – April 1, 1904) was a teacher, women's rights organizer, and industrial reformer.

== Early life ==
She was born in 1821 in Plymouth, Massachusetts to Ichabod Morton, a prominent anti-slavery worker. She had five brothers and was the only daughter. One of her ancestors was George Morton, a Plymouth Pilgrim.

As a young girl, Diaz was the secretary of a juvenile anti-slavery society, to whose funds each member aimed to contribute twenty-five cents weekly, a large sum at the time. To raise half her contribution, she went without butter and knit garters. She was influence by anti-slavery leaders William Lloyd Garrison and Horace Mann.

For a time, the family lived in the Brook Farm communal experiment in West Roxbury, Massachusetts, her father built a house there and in the 1840s, she was a teacher there. When it was clear that the community would not be a success, the Mortons returned to Plymouth.

== Early adulthood ==
She married, but it was a brief marriage that resulted in two sons. To support them, she taught at public and private schools, was a housekeeper at an island resort near Plymouth, and "put out" garments for a large clothing manufacturer. When visiting the "lofts" she saw that there were skillful women who worked there at little pay because they had no other options.

== Career ==
=== Women's Educational and Industrial Union ===
She was a founder of the Women's Educational and Industrial Union of Boston. An important work of that association was giving legal protection of helpless women and girls from employers and advertisers who did not pay fair wages. She was unanimously re-elected president of the educational and industrial association every year since its organization.

=== Writer and lecturer ===
In 1861, Diaz sent a story to Atlantic Monthly, under an assumed name, and received a check for forty dollars for it. Her stories for children, originally published in Young Folks and other magazines, have a wide fame, and series after series, beginning with William Henry's Letters to His Grandmother, Pink and Blue, The Little Country Girl, Farmer Hill's Diary, The Schoolmaster's Story and Some Account of the Early Life of a Bachelor. When Rev. Edward Eggleston became editor of Hearth and Home, he was advised by William Dean Howells to write to Diaz, and he did so, the correspondence resulting in the series of papers upon the household life of women found in The Schoolmaster's Trunk. These and others are included in two volumes, The Bybury Book and Domestic Problems.

Her letters and articles on household and domestic difficulties caused her to be looked upon as one speaking with authority, and she was invited to lecture upon those questions. She read a paper in the Woman's Congress held in Philadelphia in 1876. The paper was entitled "The Development of Character in Schools," since published in The Arena.

== Personal life ==
Diaz was interested in New Thought, which at the time was sometimes erroneously identified with Christian Science, and she took a class from the movement's founder Emma Curtis Hopkins. She wrote several pamphlets on the subject. At the end of the 19th century, she gave lecturers on the ethics of nationalism, Christian socialism, progressive morality, life, meaning of life, developing character in homes and schools, human nature, competition, and a series of papers on arbitration, first published in the Independent. She was an early advocate for Bellamyite Nationalism.

Diaz lived in her home in Belmont, Massachusetts, with her oldest son. She died there on April 1, 1904.

She was married to Emanuel Diaz, with whom she later separated, they had two sons.
