= Church of the Higher Life =

New Thought denomination

The Church of the Higher Life is a New Thought church located in Boston, Massachusetts. It was established in 1894 by Helen Van-Anderson, a student of Emma Curtis Hopkins.

The Church was the first New Thought organization with a regular leadership and governance. Van-Anderson's preaching attracted large crowds, outgrowing its meeting-place twice.
