= Frederick Bailes =

New Zealand-American author and theologian (1889–1970)

Frederick William Bailes
- Born: Frederick William Bailes; February 15, 1889; Dunedin, Otago, New Zealand
- Died: July 23, 1970 (aged 81); Lake Hughes, California, U.S.
- Resting place: Glendale, California, U.S.
- Citizenship: New Zealand (birth); United States (naturalized 1921)
- Education: London Missionary School of Medicine; Moody Bible Institute; Beloit College
- Occupations: Author, lecturer, minister, theologian
- Known for: Contributions to Religious Science and the New Thought movement
- Title: Dr.
- Spouses: Mina Isidore Gjelhaug (m. 1918; died 1920); Ida Lidia Amelia Wollerman (m. 1921); Matilde Garcia Prieto

Frederick William Bailes (1889–1970) was a New Zealand-born American author, lecturer, and prominent figure in the New Thought and Religious Science (Science of Mind) movements. A close associate of Ernest Holmes, Bailes served as Assistant Dean of the Institute of Religious Science and was a best-selling author on the application of mental principles to physical healing.

== Early life and medical training ==
Bailes was born on February 15, 1889, in Dunedin, Otago, New Zealand, to John Philip Bailes and Mary Thomson. Raised in a pioneer family with an Anglican and missionary spirit, he pursued medical missionary work as a young man. In 1915, he was completing his training at the London Missionary School of Medicine, which was connected with the London Homeopathic Hospital.

One month before his graduation, Bailes was diagnosed with severe diabetes mellitus. Because this occurred prior to the discovery of insulin, the condition was considered terminal. Harley Street specialists gave him a maximum of a year or two to live, which permanently barred him from missionary work.

During this crisis, a friend introduced him to the writings of British philosopher Thomas Troward and specifically his book The Creative Process in the Individual. Applying Troward's principles of a "Universal Creative Law," Bailes engaged in mental and spiritual treatment. He noted that his laboratory tests fluctuated greatly over the next four years before his blood sugar finally stabilized, an experience he attributed to a "complete surrender to the flow of Mind."

After regaining his health, Bailes immigrated to the United States on June 15, 1921, in Beloit, Wisconsin. He attended the Moody Bible Institute in Chicago, where he met his first wife, Mina. Settling in Wisconsin, he served as the pastor of a Baptist church in Clinton while also enrolling at Beloit College. He used his subsequent physical vitality as proof of the restorative power of mental laws; he captained Beloit's undefeated soccer team and, in February 1918, won first honors at the thirtieth annual Wisconsin Intercollegiate Oratorical Association contest with his address, "The Winning Morale."

Bailes and Mina Isidore Gjelhaug were married by his brother, Rev. Stanley Bailes, in Grand Forks, North Dakota, on September 15, 1918. They were married for two years before her death following an operation at a hospital in Rochester, Minnesota, on September 2, 1920. The following year, on December 10, 1921, he married Ida Lidia Amelia Wollerman in Rockford, Illinois.

== Career ==
=== Early ministry, national lecturing, and Religious Science ===
After serving as a Baptist minister, Bailes transitioned into the field of success psychology and vocational analysis. By 1929, he toured the country as the president of the National Society of Psychology and Health, delivering lectures on finding one's proper vocation in cities such as Beaumont, Texas. He continued to travel extensively, eventually lecturing in thirty-three different countries across three world tours.

By the late 1930s, he had settled in Southern California. In July 1937, responding to local invitations following his lecture series, Bailes opened an independent, undenominational church at the Masonic Temple in Long Beach. He offered his services free of charge and established a philosophy of religious tolerance, stating his belief that "every man has the right to find his own way to God" without demanding adherence to a specific creed. His growing congregation eventually led him to align his efforts with Ernest Holmes at the Institute of Religious Science. Bailes rose to become the Assistant Dean and a principal teacher at the institute. He headed the movement's largest church, lecturing to capacity audiences of up to 2,500 people at venues such as the Fox-Wilshire Theatre, and broadcasting twice weekly on the Los Angeles radio station KFWB. In September 1945, he was officially approved by the Board as a teacher alongside Holmes, contributing practical coursework to the institute's curriculum. Together, Bailes and Holmes co-authored the Complete Introductory Course in Science of Mind.

=== Conflict and independent ministry ===
Differences between Bailes and Holmes became public at a 1944 event when Bailes took the platform to suggest expanding the Institute globally to Chicago, London, and Paris.

Two years later on June 11, 1946, the Board refused Bailes's request to open a downtown Los Angeles chapter, Bailes stated that the denial would force his resignation. The Board accepted, and Bailes left the institute.

Following his departure from the Institute in 1946, Bailes took his following with him to major Los Angeles venues, including the Ebell Theater and the Fox-Ritz Theatre.

He also had syndicated radio broadcasts on KFWB, KFVD, and KGFJ.

== Philosophy and teachings ==
Bailes's teachings were a synthesis of his medical training and metaphysical principles, connecting early 20th-century New Thought with the mid-century positive thinking movement. He rejected psychoanalysis, stating that healing was achieved through the spiritual recognition of the "Infinite Mind" rather than the resolution of subconscious conflict. His methodology has been analyzed in scholarly studies of energy healing; epidemiologist and scholar Jeff Levin notes that for Bailes, "the treatment takes place wholly within the mind of the practitioner" and the healer "does not try to influence the mind of the patient."

His teaching centered on "exact mental equivalents." Bailes wrote: "The Law does not reason... It takes exactly what we put in our mental equivalent." He cited an individual who visualized a house but failed to manifest the income for its maintenance as evidence that the Law provides only what is included in the mental directive.

In Your Mind Can Heal You (1941), Bailes wrote: "Man is not a body containing a mind. He is a mind operating through a body." He categorized physical ailments as "distorted thought-forms," arguing that while no disease was inherently incurable, certain individuals remained so because they would not alter their thought patterns.

Bailes applied these principles to behavioral issues in What Is This Power That Heals?, arguing that recovery from alcoholism required self-worth rather than willpower. He stated that these laws applied equally to business and interpersonal relations.

Bailes advocated for a "complete surrender to the flow" of intelligence and instructed practitioners to avoid "mentally infected" environments and persons who focused on illness. According to historian Charles S. Braden, Bailes viewed the recovery of Ralph Waldo Emerson from tuberculosis as a primary example of this principle, asserting that Emerson was healed unconsciously by dwelling "deep in the sense of oneness with the Over-Soul."

Hidden Power for Human Problems (1957) was a best-seller published by Prentice Hall. His works were widely translated into French, Dutch, and Japanese.

== Personal life ==
Bailes was married three times. His first marriage was to Mina Isidore Gjelhaug in 1918, who died following a medical operation in 1920. He later married Ida Lidia Amelia Wollerman in December 1921, and later married Matilde "Matie" Garcia Prieto in 1943. He had one daughter, Gloria Lidia Bailes (1931–1968).

He retired from active ministry around 1957 and spent his later years residing in Lake Hughes, California. He died on July 23, 1970, at the age of 81.

== Publications ==
- Bailes, Frederick W. (1929). The Laws of Success & Happiness. Los Angeles: F. Bailes. OCLC 13950902.
- Bailes, Frederick W. (1936). Health Regained, Health Maintained: Nectarrettes of Raw Vegetable Juices and Fruit Juices. F. Bailes. OCLC 961189095.
- Bailes, Frederick W. (1941). Your Mind Can Heal You. New York: Dodd, Mead and Company. OCLC 1473347.
- Bailes, Frederick W. (1948). The Secret of Healing. Los Angeles: F.W. Bailes. OCLC 41990086.
- Bailes, Frederick W. (1948). Getting What You Go After. Los Angeles: Scrivener & Co. OCLC 34440026.
- Bailes, Frederick W. (1949). Healing the "Incurable". Los Angeles: Scrivener & Co. OCLC 1550758279.
- Bailes, Frederick W. (1949). Mopers, Hopers, Gropers, and Dopers. Los Angeles: F. Bailes. OCLC 41989737.
- Bailes, Frederick W. (1949). Stop Drifting and Start Driving. Los Angeles: F. Bailes. OCLC 352935717.
- Bailes, Frederick W. (1951). Basic Principles of the Science of Mind: Twelve Lesson Home Study Course. Marina del Rey, CA: DeVorss & Co. OCLC 9869623.
- Bailes, Frederick W. (1952). Help Answer Your Own Prayers. Los Angeles: F. Bailes. OCLC 41989699.
- Bailes, Frederick W. (1952). How to Find Peace in a Changing World: A Selection of Radio Broadcasts. Los Angeles: Science of Mind Church. OCLC 38074984.
- Bailes, Frederick W. (1952). The Healing Power of Balanced Emotions. Marina del Rey, CA: DeVorss & Co. OCLC 1035593134.
- Bailes, Frederick W. (1954). Is There a Cure for Frustration?. Los Angeles: F. Bailes. OCLC 41989604.
- Bailes, Frederick W. (1957). Hidden Power for Human Problems. Englewood Cliffs, NJ: Prentice Hall. OCLC 1439247.
- Bailes, Frederick W. (1986). Collected Essays of Frederick Bailes. Marina del Rey, CA: DeVorss & Co. ISBN 9780875165813. OCLC 17440213.
