= John Gaynor Banks =

Priest and the founder of the International Order of St. Luke the Physician

- Born: 3 April 1886; England
- Died: 30 January 1953 (aged 66)
- Occupation(s): Priest and religious leader
- Known for: Founder of the International Order of St. Luke the Physician
- Notable work: The Master and the Disciple
- Spouse: Ethel Tulloch Banks

John Gaynor Banks (Note: Sometimes spelled John Gayner Banks) (3 April 1886 - 30 January 1953) was an Episcopalian priest and the founder of the International Order of St. Luke the Physician.

== Biography ==
John Gaynor Banks was born in England and educated at the University of London and the Episcopal seminary in Swanee, Tennessee, United States. Banks had originally moved to America to study therapeutic psychology at the University of Missouri, but was encouraged by Henry Wilson to become an ordained minister instead.

Banks was inspired by Frederick Du Vernet and published some of his work posthumously. Banks was also a student of Emma Curtis Hopkins, the founder of New Thought, and was heavily influenced by her. He later openly acknowledged her influence, along with other New Thought writers such as Warren Felt Evans and Horatio Dresser.

In 1920, Banks was one of four Episcopal priests to organize a branch of the English Society of the Nazarene, however the organization ran into issues after the death of one of the other founders in 1929.

Banks married Ethel Tulloch, a union leader and the first woman vice president of the National Federation of Post Office Clerks, who also explored Banks' metaphysical ideas and helped him with his work in founding his organization. Some works published under John Gaynor Banks' name were ghostwritten by his wife.

Wanting to synthesize the teachings of Jesus with medical science, psychiatry, and metaphysical movements like New Thought; Banks and his wife founded the interdenominational group International Order of St. Luke the Physician. By the 1960s the conferences drew thousands of people from across the United States and Canada.

Banks died in 1953 while lecturing.

== Sources ==
- De Arteaga, William L. (19 November 2019). "A Healing Guild for America: The OSL". Pentecostal Theology.
- Darling, Frank C. (1990). Christian healing in the Middle Ages and beyond. Boulder, Colo.: Vista Publications.
- Harley, Gail M. (2002). Emma Curtis Hopkins: Forgotten Founder of New Thought. Syracuse University Press. ISBN 978-0-8156-2933-7.
- Judah, J. Stillson (1967). The History and Philosophy of the Metaphysical Movements in America. Westminster Press.
- Klassen, Pamela E. (2011). Spirits of Protestantism: Medicine, Healing, and Liberal Christianity. University of California Press. ISBN 978-0-520-95044-3.
- Smith, Jeff (13 September 2017). "Ethel Tulloch Banks: union leader and healer". San Diego Reader.
