= Christian Science Today =

1958 book by Charles S. Braden

Christian Science Today: Power, Policy, Practice
- Author: Charles S. Braden
- Language: English
- Subject: Christian Science and The First Church of Christ, Scientist
- Genre: Non-fiction
- Publisher: Southern Methodist University Press
- Publication date: 1958
- Publication place: United States
- Pages: 432
- OCLC: 918449499

Christian Science Today: Power, Policy, Practice (1958) is a book by Charles S. Braden, professor of history and the literature of religions at Northwestern University. Published by Southern Methodist University Press, it covers the history of the Christian Science and its church, The First Church of Christ, Scientist, since the death of its founder, Mary Baker Eddy, in 1910.

Reviewing the book in the Southwest Review, Charles W. Ferguson described it as the "first and only full-length treatment of the movement by a person who seeks to remain objective. ... Dr. Braden keeps his detachment as well as any human could ..."
