= Church of the Truth =

New Thought denomination

Church of Truth refers to a community of ministries in the United States, founded in 1913.

== History ==
Albert Cotton Grier (1864-1941) founded his first Church of the Truth in 1913 in Spokane, Washington. This was the first of 22 Churches of Truth founded by him in the early 20th century. His aim was to create a place which would heal the total human: mind, body and soul, thus creating a full awakening of the Christ within. The Church of Truth is part of the loosely formed New Thought movement. The Church of Truth has a vision: "We are an inclusive community of Christ-centered, prosperous, healing ministries, which through affirmative prayer and support, empower all people to awaken the Christ within." The church is a member of the International New Thought Alliance.

== Albert Grier ==
Born on February 27, 1864, Dr. Albert Grier, studied at University of Michigan where he graduated with a degree in science in 1886. He then studied for the ministry in 1890 and became a minister in the Universalist Church in Spokane, Washington. Grier left the Universalist church as he became more attracted to New Thought ideas. He became a prominent leader in the New Thought Movement, where he worked with other leaders such as Ernest Holmes. He was a fantastic "teacher" of mental, physical, and spiritual healing using the Universal Principles. He was lecturing as well as writing books which he did extensively throughout the United States.
