= Daily Word =

Daily inspirational message provided by Unity Church

- Categories: Spirituality
- Frequency: Bi-monthly
- Circulation: 400,000
- Publisher: Unity World Headquarters
- First issue: 1924
- Country: United States
- Based in: Unity Village
- Language: English
- Website: www.dailyword.com
- ISSN: 0011-5525

The Daily Word is a magazine that prints a daily inspirational message published by Unity. Themes include inner peace, hope, healing, guidance, and others.

== History ==
Daily Word magazine has been printed continuously since 1924. In the early years, most of the messages were written by its first editor, Frank B. Whitney, who started it as an offshoot of the Silent Unity ministry. It spread by word-of-mouth and quadrupled its subscribers the first year it ran.

Daily Word in Braille began in 1934, and is available for free to the blind through Message of Hope. Daily Word in Spanish, La Palabra Diaria, was first published in March 1955. Daily Word in Large Type was introduced in 1978.

Among Daily Word's former editors are Colleen Zuck and Martha Smock. The magazine has featured articles contributed by many prominent thinkers, including Wayne Dyer, Naomi Judd, Mark Victor Hansen, Wally Amos, June Allyson, David Friedman, Appiani Stephen and Thomas Moore. Cartoonist Bill Keane has also contributed. Dorothy Bridges also contributed.

In 1997, the magazine had 1.2 million subscribers and 6.5 million pass-along readers. Rodale Press published a book of 365 daily meditations based on the Daily Word.

== Notable readers ==
Edward Brooke always carried a copy of the Daily Word. Richard Block, Michael York, Doris Day, Robert Stack, Fannie Flagg, Rolonda Watts were regular readers. Oprah Winfrey says she starts each day reading Daily Word. Denzel Washington is also a reader of Daily Word.
