= Sara A. Underwood =

American suffragist

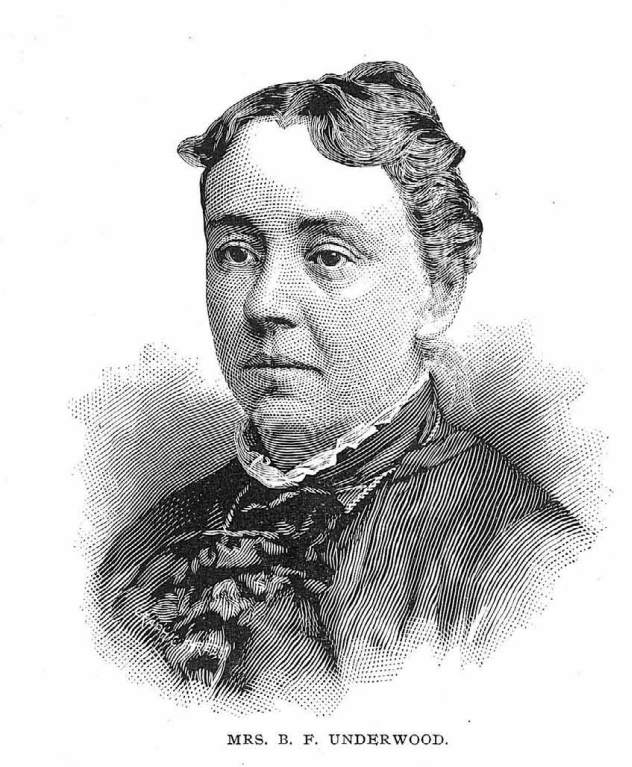
- Born: Sara A. Francis; 21 July 1838; Penrith, England
- Died: 16 March 1911 (aged 72); Jacksonville, Illinois
- Other names: Sara A. Francis Underwood
- Occupations: Writer, lecturer, editor
- Organization: National Woman Suffrage Association of Massachusetts
- Notable work: Heroines of Freethought (1876)
- Movement: Freethought, suffrage
- Spouse: Benjamin Franklin Underwood

Sara A. Underwood (21 July 1838 – 16 March 1911) was a prominent English-born American freethought lecturer and writer, and an active part of the movement for women's suffrage.

== Life ==
Sara A. Underwood was born Sara A. Francis in Penrith, Cumbria, moving with her family to Rhode Island while still a young child. She married Benjamin Franklin Underwood on 6 September 1862, the partnership described as 'a union of kindred minds as well as hearts'.

Both Underwoods became well-known figures in freethinking circles and on the lecture circuit over the course of following decades. Towards the end of the 1880s, the couple moved to Chicago to serve as editor and manager (Benjamin) and associate editor (Sara) of the journal The Open Court. The Open Court was 'devoted to the work of establishing ethics and religion upon a scientific basis.'

== Work ==
As a lecturer, Sara A. Underwood became widely known 'for espousing liberal religious thought' for over three decades. Between 1880 and 1886 she was a co-editor of the Boston Index, the organ of the Free Religious Association. She was the editor of the Psychical Science Congress' journal, the Philosophic Journal 1893–95, and chair of the Congress of Evolutionists, part of the World's Columbian Exposition in Chicago in 1893.

Underwood spoke and wrote in the cause of equal rights for women, and was treasurer of the National Woman Suffrage Association of Massachusetts.

== Death ==
Sara A. Underwood died in a sanatorium in Jacksonville, Illinois, in the early hours of 16 March 1911.
