= Home of Truth =

New Thought denomination

- Orientation: New Thought
- Associations: Affiliated New Thought Network, International New Thought Alliance
- Founder: Annie Rix Militz, Harriet Hale Rix
- Origin: 1887; San Francisco, California
- Official website: thehomeoftruth.org

The Home of Truth is a New Thought denomination founded in San Francisco, California founded by Annie Rix Militz.

== History ==
In 1887, Annie Rix Milnz attended a class led by Emma Curtis Hopkins in her home city of San Francisco. Applying her New Thought teachings, Rix claimed to have cured her own chronic headaches and deafness in one ear. Soon after she founded a New Thought bureau with classes, a bookstore, and more. Rix soon married and started traveling the country; the San Francisco center was operated by her sister, Harriet Hale Rix. In the 1890s the bureau was renamed the "Home of Truth", and by 1903 there were eight Homes of Truth in the United States. The Homes of Truth attracted an almost exclusively female following. The denomination published Master Mind magazine from 1911 to 1933. Home of Truth had some of the most rapid growth of any New Thought group in its early years, but has experienced significant decline in recent times.
