= Charles S. Braden =

American professor of religious studies

- Born: September 19, 1887; Chanute, Kansas, United States of America
- Died: 1970
- Occupation: Historian of religion
- Employer: Northwestern University (1926–1954)

Academic background
- Education: A.B. (Baker University, 1909); B.D. (Union Theological Seminary, 1912); Ph.D. (University of Chicago, 1926); D.D. (Baker University, 1943)

Academic work
- Discipline: Study of religions
- Sub-discipline: world religions; new religious movements
- Notable works: Christian Science Today (1958); Spirits in Rebellion (1963)

Charles Samuel Braden (19 September 1887 – 1970) was Professor and Chair of the Department of History and Literature of Religions at Northwestern University. He joined the faculty in 1926 and held the professorship from 1943; he was awarded emeritus status in 1954. Braden became known in particular for the study of new religious movements (NRM) and world religions. His Spirits in Rebellion: The Rise and Development of New Thought (1963) remains an important history of the New Thought family of NRMs.

== Early life and education ==
Born in Chanute, Kansas, to George Washington and Flora Birt Braden, Braden obtained his A.B. in 1909 from Baker University, and his B.D. in 1912 from Union Theological Seminary. He also spent time at Columbia University (1911–1912). In 1914 he became a Methodist minister and undertook missionary work in Bolivia (1912–1915) and Chile (1916–1922), before completing a Ph.D. in practical theology in 1926 at the University of Chicago. In 1943 he received a D.D. (doctorate of divinity) from Baker University.

== Career ==
In 1926, he joined Northwestern University as an assistant professor, becoming an associate professor in 1936 and professor in 1943. He helped to move the university's religious studies department away from its focus on Christian biblical studies, and in 1927 created its first course on Buddhism. Northwestern awarded him emeritus status in 1954.

Braden also held visiting professorships at Scripps College in Claremont, California (1954–1956) and at the Perkins School of Theology in Dallas, Texas (1954 and 1959). In 1954 he held the Fondren lecturership at Scarritt College for Christian Workers in Nashville, Tennessee, and in 1957 was a faculty member at the Evangelica de Teologia in Buenos Aires.

Braden married Grace Eleanor McMurray (1888–1951) in 1911. The couple had two sons. He married LaVenia Craddock Ulmer (d. 1964) in 1956.

== Selected works ==
Books

- Spirits in Rebellion: The Rise and Development of New Thought, Southern Methodist University Press, 1963.
- Christian Science Today: Power, Policy, Practice, Southern Methodist University Press, 1958.
- Jesus Compared: A Study of Jesus and Other Great Founders of Religions, Prentice Hall, 1957.
- War, Communism, and World Religions, Harper & Brothers, 1953.
- The Scriptures of Mankind, An Introduction, The Macmillan Company, 1952.
- These Also Believe: A Study of Modern American Cults and Minority Religious Movements, The Macmillan Company, 1949.
- Man's Quest for Salvation, Willett, Clark & Company, 1941.
- The World's Religions, A Short History, Abingdon Press, 1939.
- Varieties of American Religion, Willett, Clark & Company, 1936.
- Procession of the Gods, Harper & Brothers, 1936. (with Gaius Glenn Atkins)
- Modern Tendencies in World Religions, George Allen & Unwin, 1933.
- Religious Aspects of the Conquest of Mexico, Duke University Press, 1930.

Articles

- "Teaching the History of Religion", Journal of Bible and Religion, Vol. 17, No. 2 (Apr., 1949), pp. 108–111.
- "The Sects", Annals of the American Academy of Political and Social Science, Vol. 256, Organized Religion in the United States (Mar., 1948), pp. 53–62.
- "Why People Are Religious: A Study in Religious Motivation", Journal of Bible and Religion, Vol. 15, No. 1 (Jan., 1947), pp. 38–45.
- Braden, Charles S. (September 1934). "Church and State in Spain". Church History. 3 (3): 207–221. ISSN 0009-6407.
