= Unity Church =

New Thought religious denomination

Unity Spiritual Movement
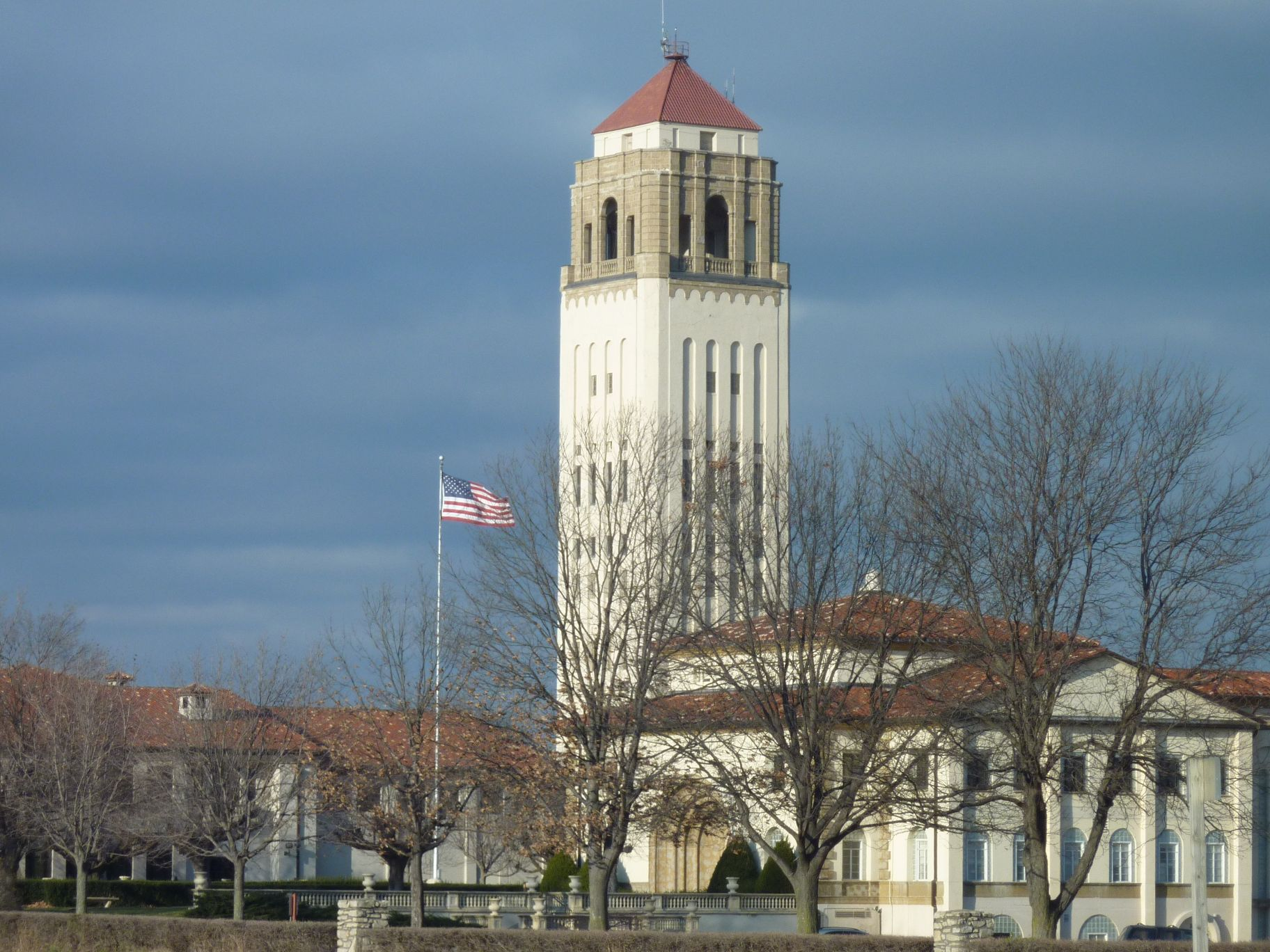
- Unity Village
- Classification: Unity (new religious movement)
- Orientation: New Thought Christianity
- CEO: Rev. Jim Blake
- Headquarters: Unity Village, Missouri
- Founder: Charles and Myrtle Fillmore
- Origin: 1889; 137 years ago Kansas City, Missouri, United States
- Official website: www.unity.org

Unity is a spiritual organization founded by Charles and Myrtle Fillmore in the United States in 1889. It grew out of Transcendentalism and became part of the New Thought movement. Unity may be best known for its Daily Word devotional publication begun in 1924. Originally based in Christianity with emphasis on the Bible, Unity has said it is a "Christian movement that emphasizes affirmative prayer and education as a path to spirituality," and says about itself, "We honor all spiritual practices and the diversity of paths leading to enlightenment."

== Overview ==
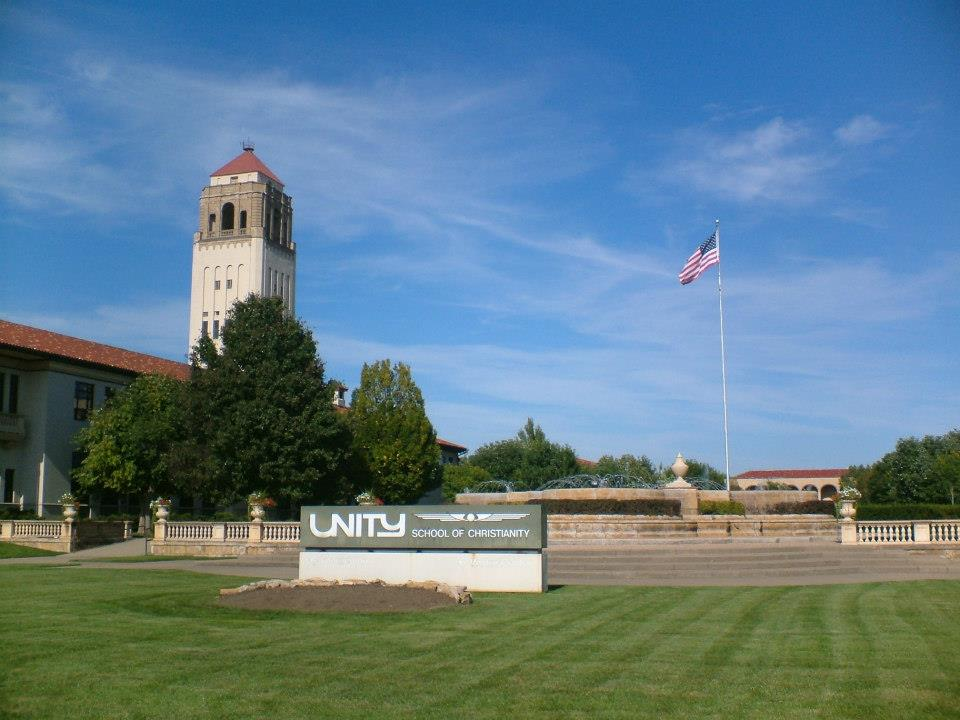
Unity School of Christianity

Unity describes itself as a global, inclusive, spiritual community, offering practical tools and uplifting resources to help people of all faiths apply positive spiritual principles in their daily lives. Unity welcomes all people regardless of race, color, gender, age, creed, religion, national origin, ethnicity, physical disability, or sexual orientation.

Unity describes itself as having no particular creed, set dogma, or required ritual. It maintains that there is good in every approach to God and holds that one should focus on the potential good in all—that the essence of every human is divine regardless of current behavior.

Unity emphasizes healing by spiritual means, but it does not reject or resist medical treatments.

Unity is the largest group connected with the New Thought movement, and the only one to maintain a significant Christian identity.

== History ==
The Unity School of Christianity was founded in Kansas City, Missouri, in 1889 by Charles Fillmore (1854–1948) and Myrtle Fillmore (1845–1931). In 1886, the Fillmores had begun attending New Thought classes held by Dr. E. B. Weeks. Subsequently Myrtle recovered from her chronic tuberculosis. She attributed this recovery to the use of prayer and other methods learned in Weeks' classes. To learn more about spiritual principles, the Fillmores studied the teachings of world religions and the links between science and religion. In addition to Weeks, they were influenced by Ralph Waldo Emerson, Emma Curtis Hopkins, and Mary Baker Eddy (the founder of Christian Science).

Although the Unity School of Christianity was not incorporated until 1914, the Fillmores began publishing their first magazine, Modern Thought, in April 1889. Later magazines included Wee Wisdom (for children) and Daily Word. In 1891, the Fillmores named the movement Unity and began publishing in 1903 with Lessons in Truth by H. Emilie Cady. In 1906, Mr. and Mrs. Fillmore accepted ordination and ordained seven other ministers.

After World War I, Unity Village, which became a 1,200-acre incorporated town, was developed 15 miles southeast of Kansas City, beginning with the purchase of a farm. Originally a weekend getaway for the Fillmores' downtown employees, Unity Village is now the headquarters for the prayer and publishing work of the Unity spiritual movement.

After Charles Fillmore's death, the Fillmores’ sons and grandchildren initially led the movement. Great-granddaughter Connie Fillmore stepped down as president in 2001. Governance was then converted to a CEO and board composed of Unity ministers and outside business people.

The mission of Unity World Headquarters is to help and serve through prayer, publishing, and community. Unity World Headquarters offers resources to people of all faiths, including magazines, booklets, videos, books, meditations, retreats, and events.

The Unity Prayer Ministry, also known as Silent Unity, has continuously prayed with people of all faiths worldwide for more than a century. Prayer associates respond to over 1 million prayer requests yearly by letter, phone, email, and social media.

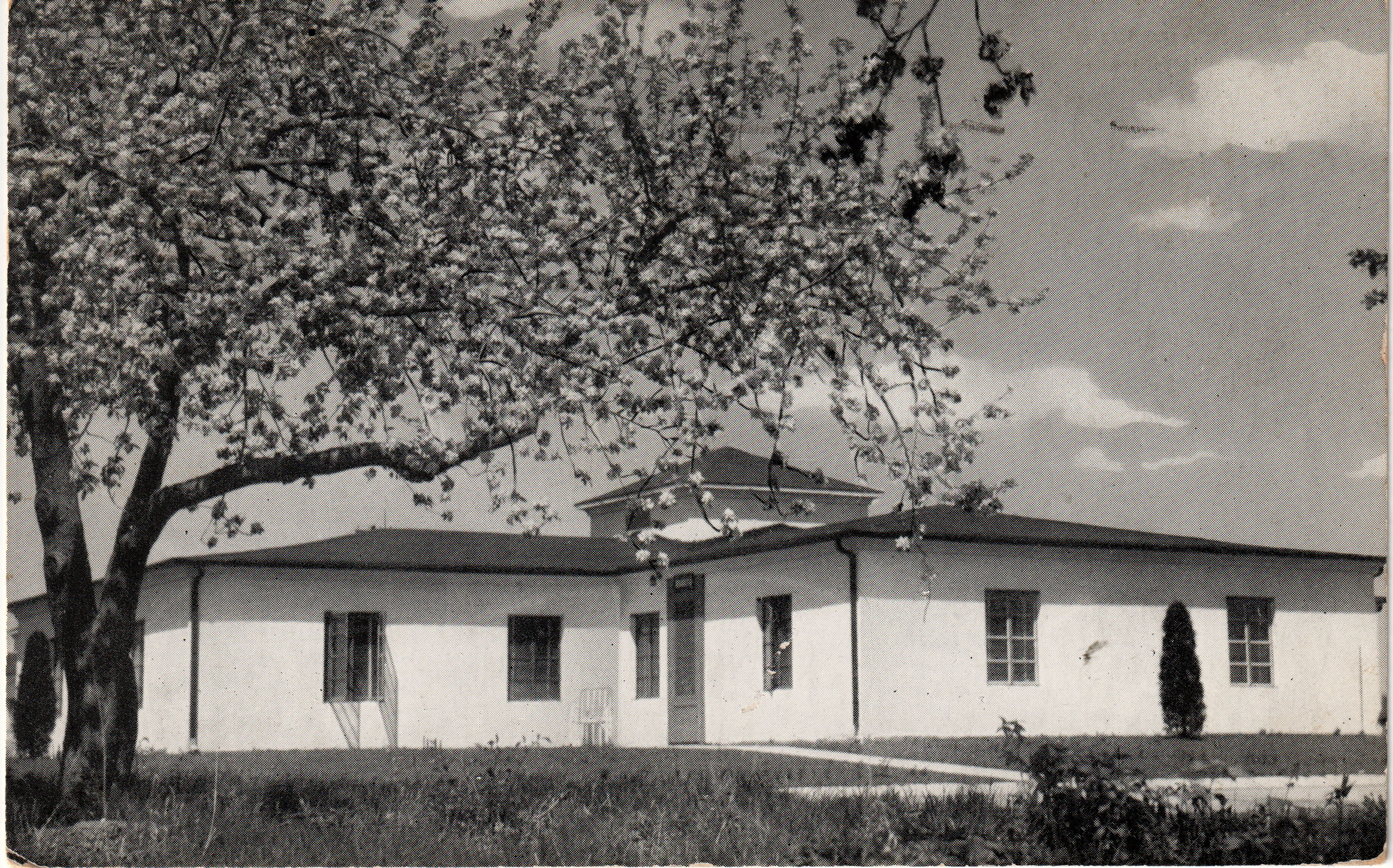
Unity Training School cottages at the world headquarters of Unity School of Christianity, about 1955

== Organization ==
Individual Unity churches are autonomous, each governed by its own board and minister. Minister training, ministerial placement, and educational resources are supported by Unity Worldwide Ministries, a separate nonprofit organization that leases office space at Unity Village from Unity World Headquarters.

In 2010, there were 594 Unity churches in the United States. Unity Worldwide Ministries counts 650 churches and 1,700 licensed and ordained leaders worldwide.

== Basic teachings ==
The five basic ideas of Unity teachings reflect the universal spiritual principles taught in most of the world's religions.

1. God is everywhere and always present in every circumstance. This divine energy underlies and animates all of existence.
2. Human beings are innately good because they are connected to and an expression of Spirit.
3. Our thoughts have creative power to influence events and determine our experiences.
4. Prayer and meditation connect and align us to our own spiritual nature and to God.
5. It is not enough to understand spiritual teachings. We must apply our learning in all areas of life, incorporating them into our thoughts, words, and actions.

Unity teaches that each person is a unique expression of God and is sacred and worthy. It emphasizes the creative power of thought and encourages choosing life-affirming thoughts, words, and actions in order to experience a more fulfilling and abundant life.

=== God ===
Unity views God as spiritual energy that is present everywhere and is available to all people. According to Unity co-founder Charles Fillmore: “God is not a person who has set creation in motion and gone away and left it to run down like a clock. God is Spirit, infinite Mind, the immanent force and intelligence everywhere manifest in nature. God is the silent voice that speaks into visibility all the life there is.”

=== Jesus ===
Unity teaches the divinity of Jesus and of all human beings. They consider him an “elder brother” or “wayshower” whose life demonstrated what is possible when we live from our innate spiritual nature or divine consciousness.

=== Nature of humanity ===
Unity teaches that all people are individual, eternal expressions of God, and their essential nature is divine and therefore inherently good. Followers believe their purpose in life is to express their divine potential as demonstrated by Jesus, and that the more they awaken to their divine nature, the more they can do this.

=== Bible ===
Unity founders Charles and Myrtle Fillmore interpreted the Bible as a metaphysical representation of each soul’s evolutionary journey toward spiritual awakening. Unity considers the Bible its primary spiritual resource, a complex collection of writings compiled over many centuries and a reflection of the comprehension and inspiration of the writers and their times.

=== Affirmative prayer ===
Affirmative prayer is understood in Unity as the highest form of creative thought. It includes the release of negative thoughts and holding in mind statements of spiritual truth. Unity teaches the use of meditation and prayer as a way to experience the presence of God, heighten the awareness of truth, and thereby transform a person's life. Prayer is believed valuable not because it alters the circumstances and conditions of a person's life but because it alters the person.

== Relationship to Christianity ==
Unlike other New Thought groups, Unity emphasizes its agreements, not differences, with traditional Christians and stresses its concurrence with the teachings of Jesus, the influence of the Holy Spirit, and the Bible. According to Unity co-founder Charles Fillmore:

It has been generally accepted that Jesus' great works were miracles and that the power to do miracles was delegated to His immediate followers only. In recent years many of Jesus' followers have inquired into His healing methods, and they have found that healing is based on universal mental and spiritual laws which anyone can utilize who will comply with the conditions involved in these laws.

Unity considers itself a non-sectarian educational institution, although Unity ministers are ordained following their prescribed courses and training.

== Notable members ==
There are well-known people affiliated with Unity such as Della Reese, Betty White, Eleanor Powell, Lucie Arnaz, David Friedman, Wally Amos, actress Michael Learned, Licensed Unity Teacher Ruth Warrick, Barbara Billingsley, Theodore Schneider, Erykah Badu, Matt Hoverman, author Victoria Moran, Patricia Neal, Johnnie Colemon, and Maya Angelou.

== See also ==
- New religious movement
- Universal Foundation for Better Living
