= Psychiana =

New Thought denomination founded by Frank Bruce Robinson

- Classification: Psychiana
- Orientation: New Thought
- Founder: Frank B. Robinson
- Origin: 1929; Moscow, Idaho, U.S.

Psychiana was a New Thought denomination created in 1928 by Frank Bruce Robinson (1886–1948), with headquarters in Turnstone Flats, Moscow, Idaho. It began and largely remained a mail-order enterprise, recruiting people through advertising in popular magazines and through direct mail solicitations. The first advertisement for Psychiana, which Robinson himself penned and took around to local publishers in Spokane, Washington, in 1929, featured a picture of Robinson with the headline, "I TALKED WITH GOD (yes I did, actually and literally)." Those who expressed an interest in Robinson's promises of health, wealth, and happiness by responding to one of his ads were offered a series of bi-weekly lessons by mail on a subscription plan. Robinson had his own printing presses and started a small publishing company, which offered many of his own books on various spiritual themes, as well as his memoir, The Strange Autobiography of Frank B. Robinson.

== Themes ==
Thematically, Robinson's ideas, as expressed in Psychiana, grew out of the metaphysical tradition and can be classified under the New Thought umbrella. Robinson adopted concepts such as affirmations, positive thinking, self-help and mental healing into Psychiana's lessons and emphasized health and material prosperity as possible rewards for dedicated and hardworking Psychiana students. Robinson said that the name he chose, "Psychiana," came to him in a dream. He referred to himself as a prophet, and envisioned his movement as becoming a worldwide, revolutionary spiritual force; at the same time, he made little effort to establish any kind of organizational structure beyond his headquarters office in Idaho, preferring to keep the operation strictly on a correspondence level.

== Controversy ==
Psychiana burgeoned during the Great Depression, but Robinson offended many of his contemporaries, not only by the "businesslike" nature of Psychiana, but also with his harsh criticisms of conventional Christianity. Deportation proceedings were initiated against him in a federal court in Idaho, his opponents claiming that he was a foreign national illegally residing in the United States. During the trial, Robinson contended that although he had been raised in England, he had been born in New York City while his father was visiting the U.S., and was therefore a U.S. citizen. Nonetheless he was ordered to leave the country. Robinson traveled to Cuba, where he stayed briefly while Idaho Senator William Borah intervened on his behalf and helped him to obtain a visa. Robinson was soon back in Idaho and became a naturalized citizen of the United States in 1942. Robinson had a penchant for mink coats and other trappings of wealth, and was accused of taking financial advantage of his followers. Mitch Horowitz devotes a chapter to Robinson in his 2009 book Occult America, writing that by all accounts Robinson was sincere in his devotion to Psychiana and truly believed he was offering useful guidance and advice. Additionally, writes Horowitz, Psychiana was wildly successful, but much of the movement's income went to cover postage costs for mailing thousands of Psychiana pamphlets. Robinson's annual income was estimated at the equivalent of about $130,000 in 2009 dollars—above the average income, but not outrageously so and within the reach of many white collar workers and hardly rising to the level of an opulent lifestyle. Upon Robinson's death in 1948, his wife, Pearl Robinson, and son, Alfred Robinson, tried to continue the operation of Psychiana. At the end of five years, however, Alfred shut the business down, refusing a buyout offer from St. Louis and giving Psychiana's archived materials to the University of Idaho. It is said that Alfred, a Presbyterian, did not agree with his father's theological beliefs.

== See also ==
- New religious movements
- New Thought Movement
- List of New Thought writers
