= Eliza Swann =

American interdisciplinary artist, writer, and educator

- Education: San Francisco Art Institute (BFA); Central Saint Martins (MA)
- Occupations: Artist, writer, educator
- Known for: Contemporary occult and alchemical arts
- Website: www.elizaswann.com

Eliza Swann is an American artist, writer, and educator known for her work in contemporary mystical and alchemical practices. Swann is the author of The Alchemical Imagination (2026) and the founder of the Golden Dome School and its successor, the Emerald School of Alchemical Arts. She teaches literature and alchemy at Pratt Institute.

== Early life and education ==
Swann earned a Bachelor of Fine Arts from the San Francisco Art Institute and a Master of Arts from Central Saint Martins in London. She has studied meditation, tarot, hypnotherapy, and other practices associated with Western esoteric traditions.

== Career ==
Swann’s early work included painting, poetry, and performance, incorporating symbolic systems, alchemical imagery, color theory, sound, and audience participation. In 2011, she produced Baba Yaga, a video work exploring ritual and nature-based practices. In 2014, Swann founded the Golden Dome School in Los Angeles, a project focusing on art and esoteric studies. The school organized workshops and public programs with institutions including Coaxial Arts, the Feminist Center for Creative Work, the Hammer Museum, and the Philosophical Research Society. In 2025, she founded the Emerald School of Alchemical Arts.

Swann has taught workshops and courses on alchemy, scrying, and related practices, including an online course for Atlas Obscura. She has presented programs at UrbanGlass, Le Petit Versailles, the Philosophical Research Society, and Emily Carr University of Art + Design. In 2016, she led a workshop on embodied alchemy near Joshua Tree, drawing on her studies with performance artist Linda Montano.

Swann’s visual work has been exhibited at the University of California, Santa Cruz; the Feminist Center for Creative Work; Cirrus Gallery; and Field Projects Gallery. She has participated in residencies at the California Botanic Garden, Art/Life Institute, Soundfjord, Saint Cecilia's Convent, The Future, and the Wassaic Project. Exhibitions include Fractal Labyrinth (2019, Occult Humanities Conference, NYU), The Spirit Goes Branching Out (2020, California Botanic Garden residency), The Work of the Sun (2021, Golden Dome School program), and She Has Risen (2017), a public art intervention commissioned by Art in Odd Places and the Foundation for Contemporary Arts.

She serves as an Adjunct Assistant Professor at Pratt Institute and has been lecturer-in-residence at the Philosophical Research Society.

== Writing ==
Swann has written about esoteric philosophy, alchemical imagery, and the role of imagination in artistic practices. Her essays have appeared in BOMB, Arthur, Momus, Contemporary Art Review Los Angeles, and Perfect Wave. Her books include The Anatomy of the Aura (2020), Green Mary (2024), and The Alchemical Imagination (2026).

She has reviewed exhibitions for Momus, including the Whitney Museum’s exhibition Fragments of a Faith Forgotten: The Art of Harry Smith. She has participated in the panel Oracular Visions at Emily Carr University of Art + Design and co-hosted a public event on Mandy Aftel’s The Museum of Scent at the Philosophical Research Society.
