= When Were You Born =

1938 film by William C. McGann

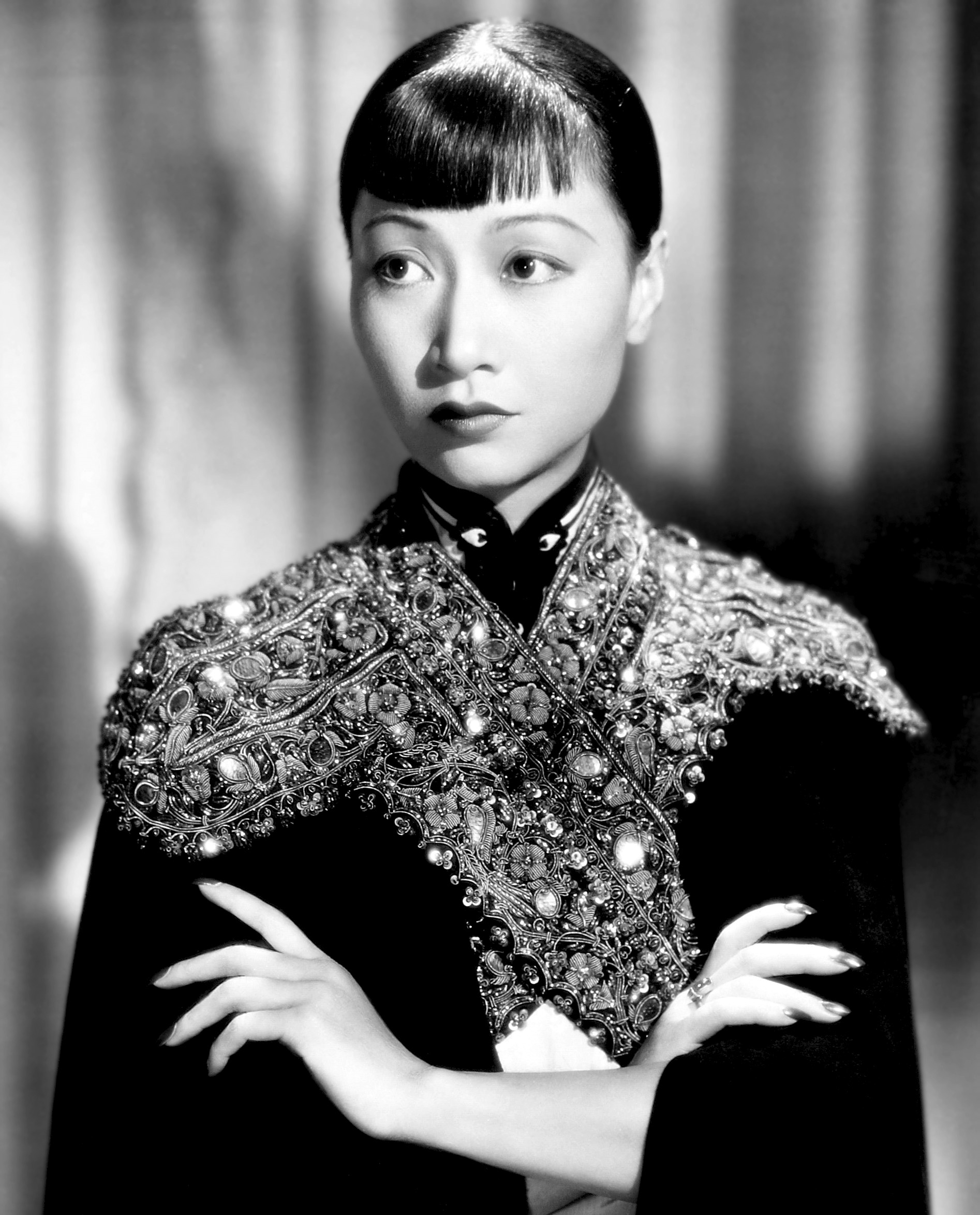
- Anna May Wong in 1937
- Directed by: William C. McGann
- Written by: Manly P. Hall (story); Anthony Coldeway
- Produced by: Bryan Foy
- Starring: Margaret Lindsay; Anna May Wong
- Narrated by: Manly P. Hall
- Cinematography: L. W. O'Connell
- Edited by: Doug Gould
- Music by: Bernhard Kaun
- Production company: Warner Bros. Pictures
- Distributed by: Warner Bros. Pictures
- Release dates: June 8, 1938 (New York); August 11, 1938 (Los Angeles)
- Running time: 65 minutes
- Country: United States
- Language: English

When Were You Born [sic] is a 1938 American murder-mystery film directed by William C. McGann and starring Anna May Wong as an astrologer who helps the police. Each of the twelve principal characters was born under a different astrological sign.

== Plot ==
On an ocean liner sailing from the Orient to San Francisco, Mei Lei Ming predicts the future of fellow passenger Nita Kenton. When Nita's boyfriend, importer Phillip Corey, scoffs at her predictions, Mei Lei informs him that he will die within 48 hours.

Corey is later found dead in his shop, an apparent suicide. However, police inspector Jim C. Gregg is certain that it is a homicide and questions Mei Lei. She convinces him of her innocence and helps the police solve the case as well as two other related murders. Police forensic scientist Dr. Merton remains firmly scornful of Mei Lei's unscientific methods.

When Corey's Chinese business partner Frederick Gow appears at the police station, he recognizes Juggler Barrows, who was being questioned about an unrelated crime. Gow announces that he wants to recover some business letters from Corey's safe, and Mei Lei becomes suspicious. When the letters are later examined, Mei Lei discovers a coded message that indicates that Corey and Gow were involved in drug smuggling.

Corey had been engaged to Doris Kane, although she preferred a man named Larry Camp. Under questioning, Kane reluctantly reveals that Corey had blackmailed her mother into pressuring her to accept the marriage arrangement. She also acknowledges that she visited Corey's home on the night when he was killed to try to persuade him to break the engagement. She was followed by Camp, who then quarreled with Corey. A shot was fired, but Camp claims that Corey fired at him. Corey's valet Shields is also a suspect.

Meanwhile, Gow encounters Barrows, who is astonished to see him, as Gow had deceived him into believing that Gow was Corey. Gow is relieved that Sergeant Kelly did not believe Barrows when he claimed to have spoken to Corey some time after the real Corey had been killed. Gow lures Barrows away. Later, Barrows' dead body is flung from a speeding car.

Convinced that Gow is the killer, Gregg visits his apartment with Mei Lei and some policemen to search it. Gow escapes through a hidden passageway. He spots Mei Lei alone in his reading room and takes her captive. However, Shields, who had seen Gow entering the secret passageway and followed him, shoots Gow dead. Mei Lei, seeing that Shields is an expert gunman, coaxes him to admit that he had killed Corey.

The true sequence of events is made clear. Gow had hired Barrows to open Corey's safe, and when Corey returned unexpectedly, they hid. Shields entered the room at just the wrong moment, and, accused of theft, shot Corey in self-defense.

== Cast ==
- Margaret Lindsay as Doris Kane (Leo)
- Anna May Wong as Mei Lei Ming (Aquarius)
- Lola Lane as Nita Kenton (Cancer)
- Anthony Averill as Larry Camp (Aries)
- Charles C. Wilson as Inspector Jim C. Gregg (Taurus)
- Jeffrey Lynn as Davis (Gemini)
- Eric Stanley as Shields (Virgo)
- James Stephenson as Phillip Corey (Libra)
- Leonard Mudie as Frederick Gow (Scorpio)
- Olin Howland as Peter Finlay (Sagittarius)
- Maurice Cass as Dr. Merton (Capricorn)
- Frank Jaquet as Sergeant Kelly (Pisces)

== Production ==
Warner Bros. Pictures hired Manly P. Hall of the Philosophical Research Society to write the screenplay for the film, which was believed to have been the first to deal with astrology as a serious topic. Hall also assisted with casting and provided technical advice. Hall stated: "There is a ready-made audience of 10,000,000 for definitely metaphysical themes in the United States—in addition to the general public. It is the richest untouched field of entertainment that remains to be exploited, for nearly every human being has had an experience he cannot explain, yet cannot forget!"

Newspaper advertisements for the film stated: "NOTE! The entire cast of this production was selected according to astrological calculations!" However, of the billed cast, only Jaquet was born under the sign that he represents in the film.

== Reception ==
In a contemporary review for The New York Times, critic Frank S. Nugent called When Were You Born "a routine murder mystery as a pretext for expounding the zodiac rigamarole" and wrote: "Anna May Wong demonstrates that your curly hair, or stubborn chin, or propensity for murder is all a matter of when you were born. Her system worked so well, both forward and back, in weeding out the suspects and tripping up the liars that we wondered why, at the last, she had to put her charts aside and plunge into the sliding panel, shadows-on-the-wall school of cinema criminology."

Lionel Collier, writing for the British magazine, Picturegoer, also commented on the use of astrology to solve murder as "novel, if not very credible … but those whose interest in astrology is strong enough, will be well entertained." He commented that Anna May Wong "gives quite a sound characterization", but overall his review was negative and he wrote that "the settings are not very varied and action is slow up to the last reel."

More recently, Jeff Stafford of Turner Classic Movies described the film as "an oddity if nothing else", noted that the premise was "quite unusual for its day" and that it "is an unpretentious little B-unit programmer from Warner Bros., it manages, in its brief 66 minute running time, to incorporate a Rashomon-like flashback structure with multiple suspects and climaxes with a double twist ending." Stafford stated that Wong was considered "past her peak" by the time of this film, and was second-billed to Margaret Lindsay despite appearing in almost every scene and that she "gives a surprisingly flat performance and comes off like some straitlaced schoolmarm, who alternates between officious behavior and mild irritation toward any naysayers." He wrote that the supporting cast is "energetic": James Stephenson "makes the most of his juicy role", Margaret Lindsay "provides the drama" and Lola Lane is "feisty and funny."
