= Turnstone Flats =

Coordinates: 46.7321°N 117.0025°W

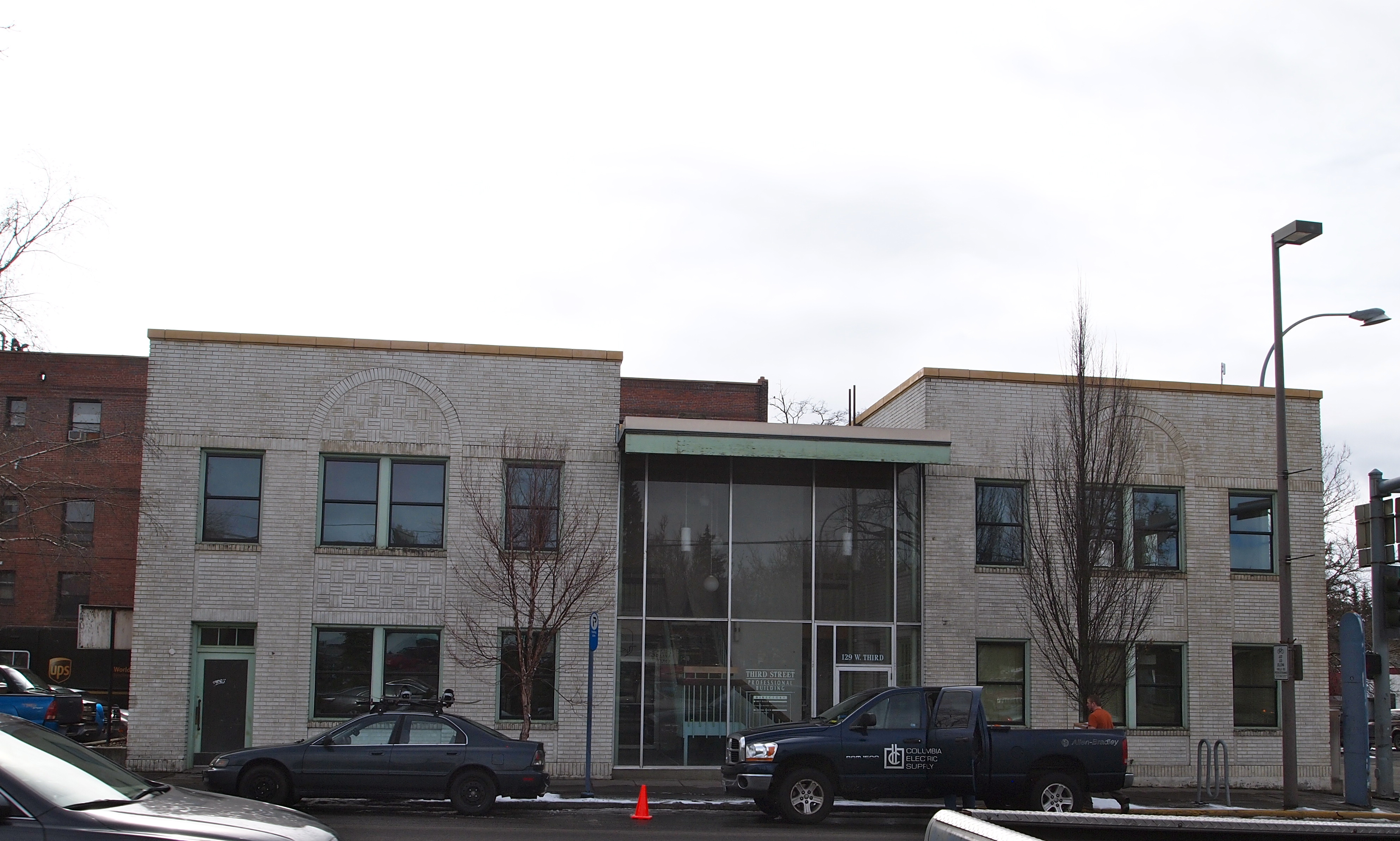
Looking south at 129 W 3rd Street in Moscow, Idaho

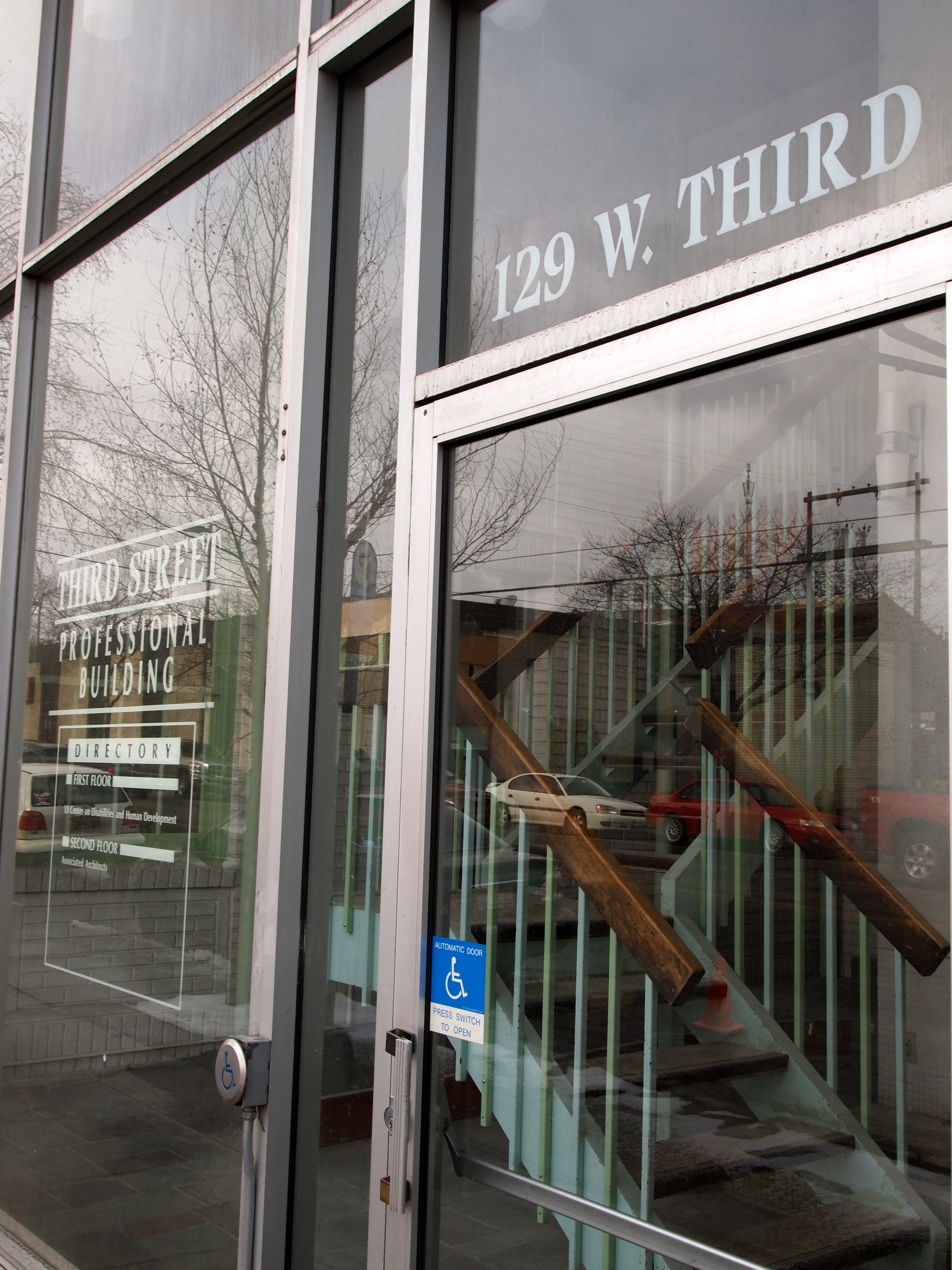
Entrance Series

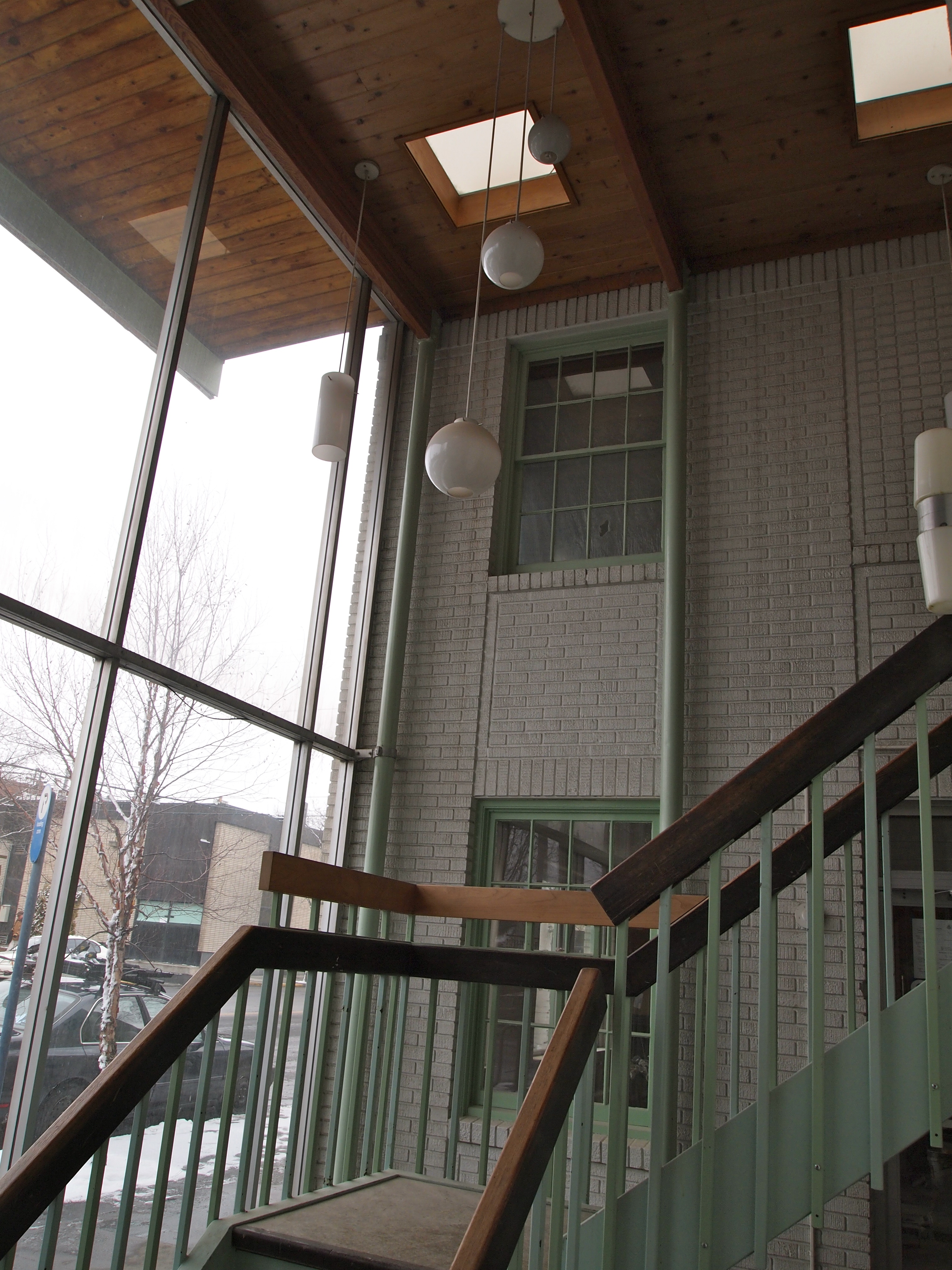
Interior of the atrium

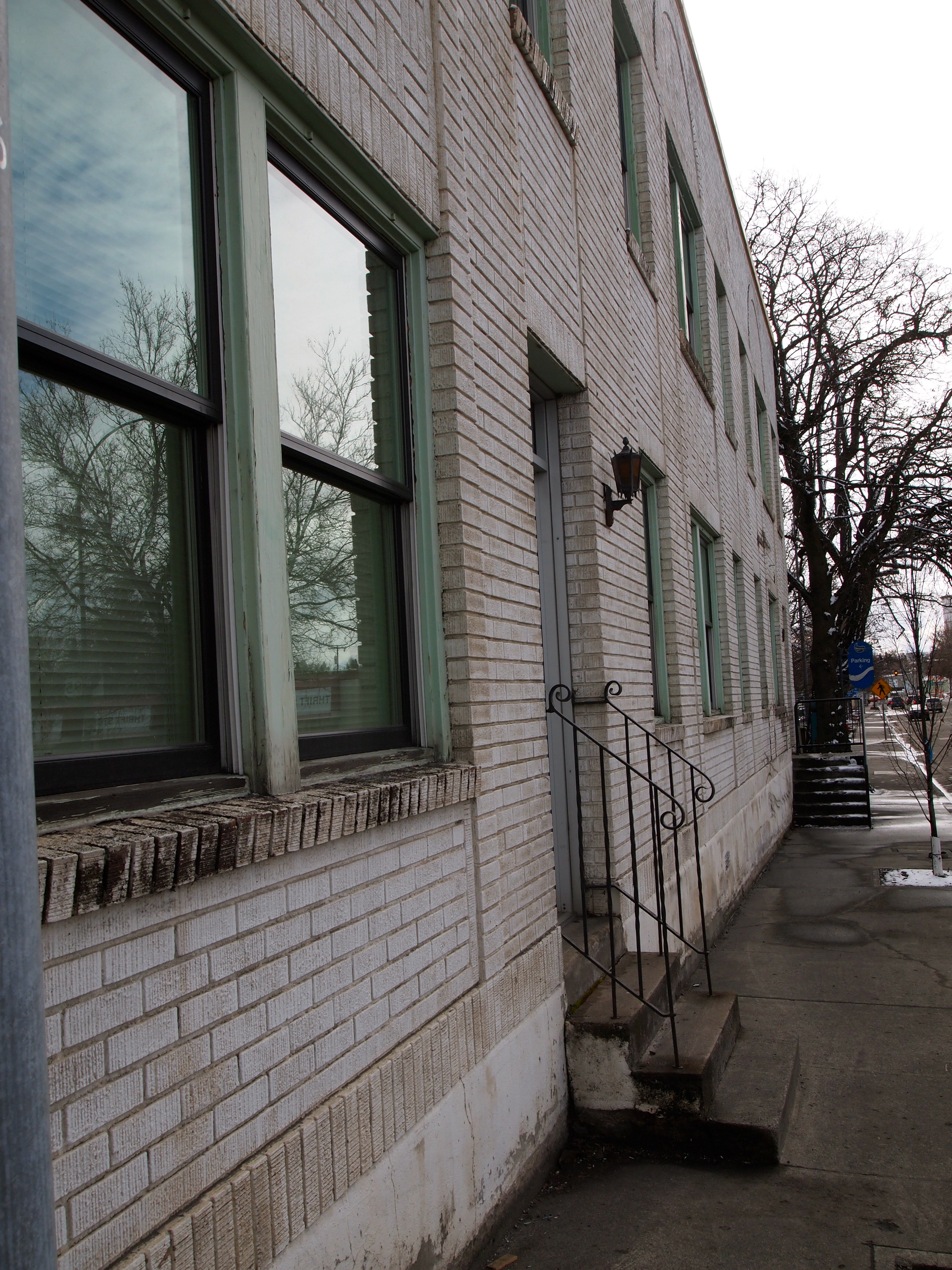
Side profile of the building

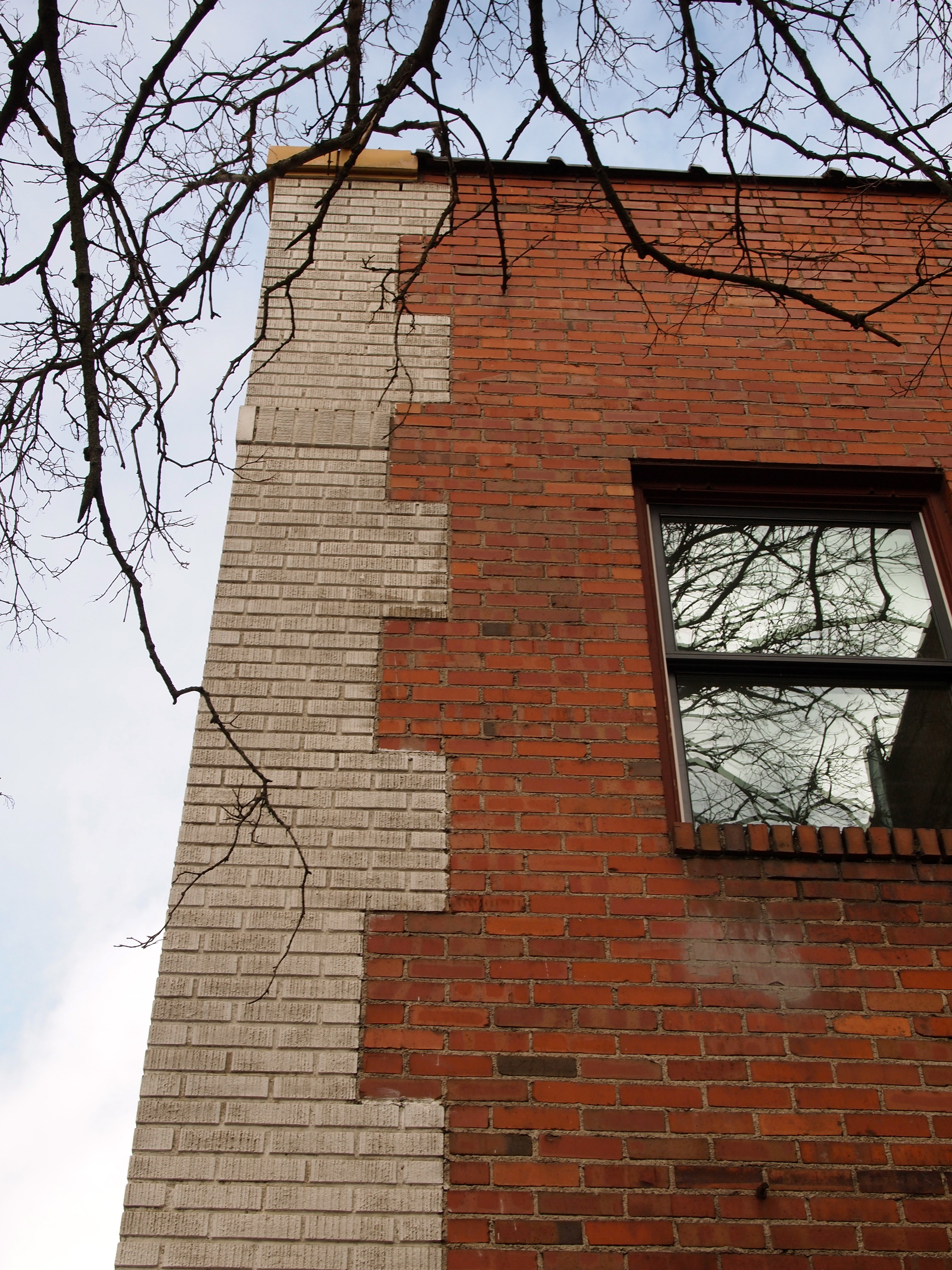
Back side of the building

Turnstone Flats is a property in the northwest United States, located on the southeast corner of Third and Jackson streets in Moscow, Idaho. The building that stands on the corner was built as a headquarters for a religion called Psychiana. This building was largely used to produce and mail the lessons of Psychiana all over the world. During the twenty-five years that this religion flourished, it was the seventh largest religion in the world. The majority of the religious lessons were written and mailed off from this site.

== History of the building ==
=== Psychiana ===
129 West Third Street consists of two lots on the third block of the western portion of downtown Moscow. The first structure on the property was a boarding house which eventually became a funeral parlor. The Short’s Funeral Chapel used the old boarding house until the Short's sold the property to Frank B. Robinson, who was the founder of Psychiana. With the purchase of this property, Psychiana was operating out of three buildings along the Third Street block in the heart of downtown Moscow.

Due to the large volume of mail that Psychiana was receiving and sending daily, the Moscow Post Office received a Class A Rating; which the post office still operates under today. As the religion began to grow, the religion began to outgrow the headquarters. In March 1934, they moved into a “beautiful, new concrete and brick building” which adorned the lots that Robinson acquired from the Shorts two years earlier. The new building contained an air change apparatus and could also accommodate up to three working crews, as well as the immense volumes of business. Psychiana employed approximately one hundred employees, and each employee handled up to 50,000 pieces of mail per day. The headquarters received an average of 1,300 pieces of correspondence each day.

=== Life after Psychiana ===
In January 1949, Pearl Robinson sold the building on the corner of Third Street and Jackson to the Medical Arts and Professional Building, Inc. The building was largely a professional center until the property was sold to Dr. John Ayers in January 1977. Ayers went on to own the building until December 1985, when he donated the property to the University of Idaho. After he donated the building, it still remained a professional center and the university sold the property in April 2011 to Turnstone, LLC. a local development company.
