= Occult America =

2009 book by Mitch Horowitz

- Author: Mitch Horowitz
- Publisher: Bantam Books
- Publication date: September 9, 2009
- Pages: 304
- Awards: PEN Oakland Josephine Miles Award (2010)
- ISBN: 978-0-553-80675-5
- OCLC: 299706517
- Dewey Decimal: 130
- LC Class: BF1434.U6 H67 2009

Occult America: The Secret History of How Mysticism Shaped Our Nation is a 2009 book by Mitch Horowitz published by Bantam Books. The book is focused on the role that new religious movements play in the history of the United States; Horowitz argues that these movements, often marginalized or ignored by mainstream culture, played a substantial role in shaping American society. Occult America covers a wide range of individuals, movements, and beliefs from the eighteenth through twentieth centuries, with Horowitz paying particular attention to figures such as Manly P. Hall, Henry A. Wallace, and Edgar Cayce, as well as the Spiritualist movement and its element of greatest mainstream popularity, the Ouija board.

The book received mixed to positive reviews. Critics praised the writing style and depth of research, but described the scope as exceptionally broad, limiting the work's ability to cover individual subjects. Occult America won the 2010 PEN Oakland Josephine Miles Award and established Horowitz's ongoing writing career.

== Synopsis ==
The central thesis of Occult America is that esoteric religious movements were a founding element of both spiritual and secular American culture. The early chapters focus on an array of figures in eighteenth- and nineteenth-century American religious movements, such as Ann Lee, Henry Steel Olcott, Helena Blavatsky, Joseph Smith, and the Public Universal Friend. The first chapter particularly focuses on the Burned-Over District, a region of Upstate New York with an especially dense prevalence of Christian religious movements such as the Shakers and Latter Day Saint movement.

The second chapter focuses on elements of American occultism less associated with Christianity, such as Theosophy and Western Buddhism. Horowitz particularly focuses on Spiritualism's focus on communication with the dead and its popularity during the American Civil War; the popularity of mediums soared during the Civil War, as the families of deceased soldiers sought the possibility of reconnecting with their lost relatives. He describes the example of Abraham and Mary Todd Lincoln, whose interests in Spiritualism were spurred by the death of their son William Wallace Lincoln in 1862 at the age of eleven. Though Mary Todd Lincoln's interest in Spiritualism was well-covered by contemporary and later sources, often to discredit her alongside discussion of her mental health, Horowitz suggests Abraham Lincoln may have been similarly interested in the phenomenon; he analyses contemporary reports of séances in the White House and the 1891 publication Was Abraham Lincoln a Spiritualist?, controversial memoir of the medium Nettie Colburn Maynard.

Following this general overview, Horowitz focuses on Ouija boards, a Spiritualist invention that became part of mainstream popular culture in the twentieth century. He discusses myths surrounding their origins, such as the idea they trace back to classical figures such as Pythagoras. Horowitz covers the origins of the Ouija board in the mid-nineteenth century; its later commercialization by William Fuld, a Presbyterian businessman who openly disclaimed the object's supernaturalism; and its influence on popular culture, such as its inspiration of the Pulitzer-winning epic poem The Changing Light at Sandover. The book then moves to cover movements, such as Christian Science and New Thought, that focus on the concept of manifestation. Horowitz presents this as a uniquely American-origin form of esotericism, juxtaposed with earlier movements with greater European influence, and chronicles its rise in popularity.

Later sections of Occult America cover African diaspora religions such as Louisiana Voodoo. Horowitz first covers figures such as Black Herman and the pseudonymous Henri Gamache before addressing specifically black nationalist figures and movements, such as Marcus Garvey, the Nation of Islam, and the Moorish Science Temple of America. The seventh chapter—the first to deal exclusively with a specific individual—biographizes Manly P. Hall, founder of the Philosophical Research Society. Occult America's eighth chapter deals with the role of esotericism in twentieth-century politics, particularly through Franklin D. Roosevelt's vice president Henry A. Wallace. Wallace, a high-ranking Freemason and self-described "practical mystic", took credit for the inclusion of the Eye of Providence on the dollar bill. Horowitz depicts Wallace's contemporaries as increasingly suspicious of his philosophy and motives, eventually ousting him from the vice presidential position in 1944.

The final chapters of Occult America discuss differences between European and American occult practices. Horowitz argues that while European mysticism in the 19th and 20th centuries "could seem to cling to secrecy almost as an end in itself", with a focus on initiation into underground occult orders, American mysticism was far more open. By discussing supernatural or esoteric beliefs openly, practitioners in the United States brought such ideas into the mainstream, inspiring the twentieth-century popularity of phenomena such as astrology and numerology. The book closes with a chapter-long biography of Edgar Cayce, who Horowitz presents as a metonym for the persistent popularity of mysticism in American culture; by spreading a message of "hope and dignity" to people who felt disaffected or abandoned by mainstream society, Cayce encapsulated the practices that, Horowitz argues, made large sectors of the population open to such concepts.

== Publication and reception ==
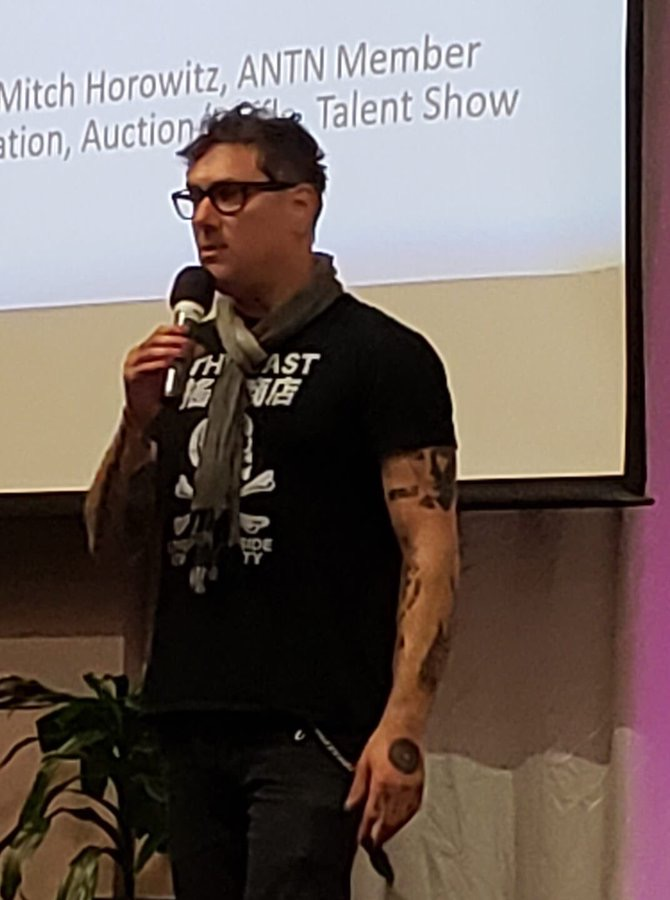
Mitch Horowitz in 2019

Occult America was published through Bantam Books, an imprint of Random House, on September 9, 2009. It is 304 pages long. Horowitz, who was then editor-in-chief of Penguin Group's New Age imprint TarcherPerigee, was in his early-mid forties at the time of the book's publication. He remarked to The Creative Independent that he had come to doubt he would become a published author; the experience of seeing Occult America through publication encouraged him to keep up a high pace and output of writing.

Following its release, the book received mixed to positive reviews. Amongst mainstream reviewers, Publishers Weekly praised its research and "authoritative" tone, but Kirkus Reviews dismissed it as a "hodgepodge" that jumped inconsistently between subject matters without coherently presenting the history of American occultism. Library Journal described it as "less than comprehensive", but nonetheless recommended the work for its tone and bibliography. The Washington Post and The Washington Times both received the book positively in interviews with Horowitz, the former noting its "evenhanded" approach to diverse beliefs and the latter complimenting Horowitz's research.

Religious reviewers focused on Horowitz's coverage of their own beliefs and practices. Matthew Bowman, the Howard W. Hunter Chair of Mormon Studies at Claremont Graduate University, reviewed Occult America for the Journal of Mormon History. He described the book as "often gleefully fascinating", but "weirdly organized" in its focus on a vast variety of figures across geographical and chronological bounds. Bowman was similarly disappointed by Horowitz's relatively brief description of Mormonism, which he felt was unduly focused on by the book's blurb, but referred to Occult America's ability to cover figures as diverse as Joseph Smith, Mary Baker Eddy, and Maharishi Mahesh Yogi as "an achievement not to be sneezed at". Eugene Taylor, writing from a Swedenborgian perspective, felt Occult America underrepresented Emanuel Swedenborg's influence on American religious history; nonetheless, he called the book "a fascinating subject and a great read" but inclined to "ignore or downplay the dark side of the movement [Horowitz] is describing".

Several reviewers remarked upon Horowitz's expansive definition of the occult. Taylor argued that Occult America deals not with occultism per se but with what he called "occult-lite", a "sanitized version of spiritualism, magic, New Thought, Christian Science, faith healing, and utopian idealism" that he juxtaposed with more centrally "occultist" Left-Hand Path practices. Bowman identified the book's definition as "anything Horowitz finds novel, interesting, or appropriately weird", criticising it as imprecise and arguably applicable to mainstream religions such as Orthodox Judaism.

Occult America was a winner of the 2010 PEN Oakland Josephine Miles Award, alongside Anna In-Between by Elizabeth Nunez and Master of the Eclipse by Etel Adnan. The book helped establish Horowitz's reputation as a writer on occultism and esotericism, and was described in 2022 as a "still-relevant" publication that established "his work to bring occult and esoteric ideas into the public discourse".

== See also ==
- List of new religious movements
- New religious movements in the United States
