= Mitch Horowitz =

American writer

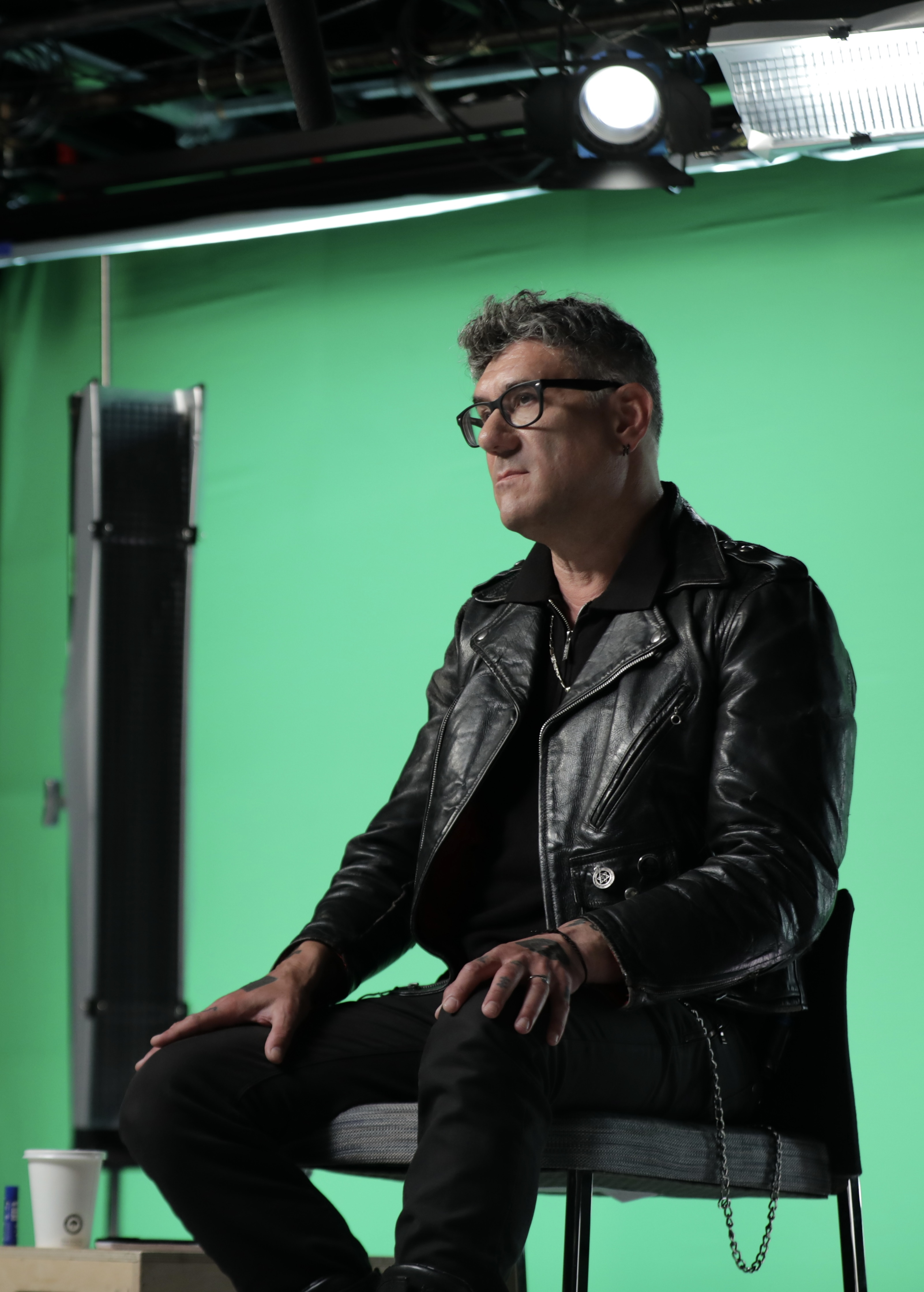
- Horowitz at A&E Studios in New York City in September 2025.
- Born: November 23, 1965 (age 60)
- Occupations: Author, speaker, television host
- Website: mitchhorowitz.substack.com

Mitch Horowitz (born November 23, 1965) is an American author, publisher, speaker, podcaster, and television host specializing in occult and esoteric themes. A frequent writer and speaker on religion and metaphysics in print and on television, radio, and online, Horowitz's writing has appeared in The New York Times, The Washington Post, The Wall Street Journal, Time, and CNN.com, and he has appeared on NPR, CBS News, NBC News, and Vice News.

In 2024, Horowitz began hosting the UFO-themed Discovery/HBO Max TV series, Alien Encounters: Fact or Fiction, and joined Elijah Wood's podcast network, SpectreVision Radio, where he hosts a historical podcast, Extraordinary Evidence: ESP Is Real, which explores the background and data of extrasensory perception (ESP) research. Horowitz plays himself as a historian and commentator in V/H/S/Beyond, the seventh entry in the horror anthology series on Shudder, which a reviewer for RogerEbert.com described as "one of the better V/H/S anthologies of late;" the film was nominated for Best Movie Made for Television at the 2025 Critics Choice Awards. He appears in the 2025 MGM+ docuseries Let the Devil In.

Horowitz is the former editor-in-chief of TarcherPerigee and a former vice-president at Penguin Random House. His best-known works are Occult America (2009), The Miracle Club (2018), and Modern Occultism (2023).

In 2022, author and self-titled "magic experience designer" Ferdinando Buscema writing for Boing Boing noted that "Horowitz is among the most articulate and respected voices in the contemporary occulture scene." In 2025, he published a book of magick, history, and occult spirituality titled Practical Magick. Also in 2025, Horowitz began writing a newsletter for Substack, "Mystery Achievement," focused on occultism in history and practice.

== Early life ==
The son of a legal aid attorney and a medical secretary, Horowitz grew up in Bellerose, Queens, before moving to New Hyde Park, New York. He was raised in a traditional Jewish household and had an Orthodox bar mitzvah. He developed an interest in the occult through books of folklore at his local public library, book-club catalogs at elementary school, and astrological content, such as newspaper horoscopes, whose references he historically researched. Horowitz received a bachelor of arts in English literature from Stony Brook University, where he was editor-in-chief of the school's student newspaper, The Statesman. In 1987, he won the Martin Buskin Award for Outstanding Campus Journalism. Before entering publishing, he worked as a police reporter.

He identifies as a "believing historian" and has participated in many of the spiritual movements he writes on, such as Theosophy, New Thought, Transcendental Meditation, and the Gurdjieff Work.

In the early nineties, Horowitz served as youth-section treasurer of the Democratic Socialists of America and on the editorial committee of its magazine, Democratic Left, an experience he described as "building an organization in its darkest days in hopes of future utility."

== Writing and lectures ==
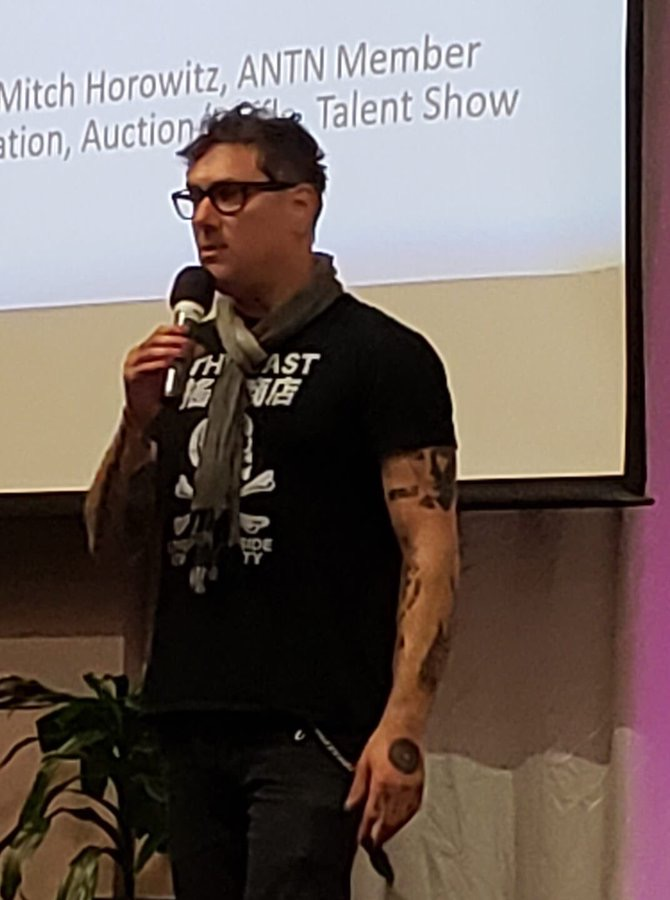
Horowitz speaking in Kansas City, Missouri in 2019

Horowitz is the author of Occult America: The Secret History of How Mysticism Shaped Our Nation, which received the 2010 PEN Oakland/Josephine Miles Award, and was noted for exploring the impact of occult and esoteric philosophies on mainstream politics and culture; the Washington Post stated that "Horowitz teases out fascinating stories of the 'dreamers and planners who flourished along the Psychic Highway'... In showing how the paths of these figures occasionally intersected with the likes of Abraham Lincoln, Frederick Douglass and Franklin D. Roosevelt, Horowitz argues that the influence of the occult extends beyond the séance room and into the mainstream of American thought."

He has also brought attention to the use that notable historical figures have made of occult and esoteric thinking, citing not only Frederick Douglass and hoodoo, but Mahatma Gandhi and Theosophy, Charles Lindbergh and Spiritualism, Theodore Dreiser and paranormalism, and Upton Sinclair and telepathy. He has also noted that Rosicrucianism and the Shakers have contributed to America's history of religious experimentation.

Horowitz notes the impact of Freemasonry on conceptions of religious liberty in the American colonies and classifies the Bavarian Illuminati as "radical Jeffersonians" focused on initiatory esotericism and liberal reform.

Horowitz believes that occultism is a uniquely Western tradition, and that the Renaissance-era rediscovery and adaptation of pre-Abrahamic belief systems inaugurated a new era for those beliefs, thereby making occultism, as integrated into modern society, an ancient revivalist movement.

He has sought to distinguish the complexity of New Thought works, as exemplified by Neville Goddard and Wallace Wattles, from the well-known but somewhat more simplified understandings of the law of attraction, as popularized most notably by Rhonda Byrne's 2006 book The Secret, which Horowitz notes was inspired by Wattles' famous 1910 book The Science of Getting Rich. Furthermore, Horowitz has contextualized New Age figures and books, including Goddard, Edgar Cayce, and The Kybalion, as contemporary expressions of Gnostic and Hermetic themes.

He has brought attention to the work of Australian psychiatrist Ainslie Meares, who conducted studies that demonstrated the therapeutic efficacy of "intensive meditation" on cancer patients both who were receiving chemotherapy and who were not.

His 2023 book Modern Occultism was noted for its historical comprehensiveness, surveying occult-themed philosophies from late-antiquity to the present.

Horowitz has also written on alternative spirituality for Politico, Salon, Big Think, U.S. News & World Report, Gnosis: Journal of Gnostic Studies, Parabola, Esopus, Fortean Times, and the Religion News Service.

Writing in The Washington Post in 2010, Horowitz identified themes and language from occult scholar Manly P. Hall in the speeches of President Ronald Reagan, including the story of an "unknown speaker" at the signing of the Declaration of Independence and America's assignation "to fulfill a mission to advance man a further step in his climb from the swamps." In 2021, in the Eisner-nominated Mysterious Travelers, culture scholar Zack Kruse wrote: "Horowitz draws specific attention to how Reagan infused New Thought and mind power language into the declaration of his candidacy in 1979... Horowitz provides a revised context that places Reagan, and his story, within the mystic liberal frame."

Horowitz has lectured at spiritual centers including the Philosophical Research Society, the Theosophical Society in America, and numerous Freemasonic lodges; universities such as Rice University, Duke University, and The New School for Social Research; and cultural venues including the Anthology Film Archives, the Mark Twain House and Museum, and Hancock Shaker Village. In spite of its continued marginalization in mainstream academia, Horowitz advocates for the validity of academic parapsychology research, defending its findings in books, articles, and talks, and he is a critic of professional skepticism. He has addressed some of the historical controversies and correspondences involving the Duke University professor and writer J. B. Rhine, who popularized parapsychology and ESP in American thought and wider culture in the 1930s through the 1960s.

Horowitz has also collaborated with author, speaker, and podcaster Douglas Rushkoff, known for his work on occult and esoteric history and ideas. In 2023, the two did a live talk on stage at an event titled "Can Magick Save Us? – Team Human Live in NYC," and Horowitz has been a recurring guest on Rushkoff's podcast, where they have explored questions and challenges of technology, media, and psychology.

In 2009, Horowitz was on the faculty of the urban holistic learning center, the New York City Open Center, for its annual Esoteric Quest. He presented lectures at the Open Center entitled The Psychic Highway: New York's 'Burned-Over District' and the Growth of Alternative Spirituality in America and Made in America: The Hidden History of 'Positive Thinking'.

Horowitz has called attention to the worldwide problem of violence against accused witches, helping draw notice to the human rights element of the issue. Chinese government censors excised nearly 40% of a Mandarin translation of Horowitz's 2014 book One Simple Idea, a history of the positive-mind movement.

Horowitz wrote the catalogue essay for the 2025 Raymond Pettibon / John Newsom exhibit The Seven Deadly Sins and The Seven Heavenly Virtues at the Kebbel Villa Museum in Schwandorf, Germany, noting: "Raymond Pettibon and John Newsom do us the favor of avoiding the shallows of explicitness and instead capture jarring episodes of the sinful and salvific, notions incomplete and often confusing in our lives." In the essay Horowitz further wrote, "I will not deny my joy at writing about Pettibon whose Black Flag bars are tattooed on top of my righthand; I saw them at age seventeen in 1982."

Writer Will Solomon in CounterPunch called Horowitz's 2025 book Practical Magick "an impressive blend of interrogated history and hands-on, practical techniques," noting that "Horowitz's writing stands out for its fundamentally sober, journalistic engagement with the material."

The California-based garage rock band Death Valley Girls wrote and recorded a song called "10 Day Miracle Challenge" for their 2020 album Under the Spell of Joy, and note that it was inspired by Horowitz's affirmation-and-intentionality program of the same name, as well as by his 2018 book The Miracle Club.

== Film and television ==
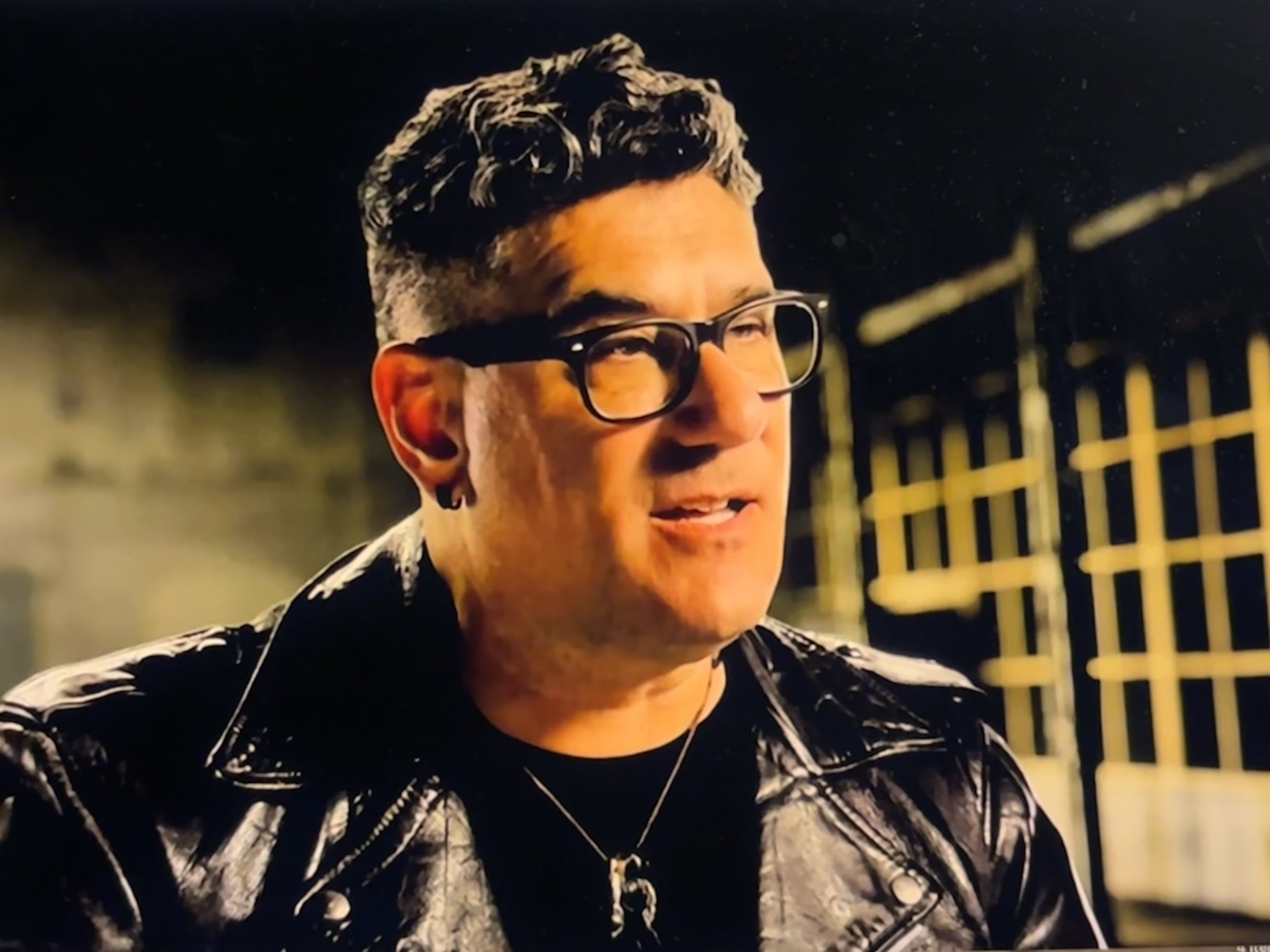
Horowitz on the set of The UnBelievable with Dan Aykroyd, 2026.

Horowitz has appeared on television shows including Vox/Netflix's Explained; History Channel's Ancient Aliens and The UnXplained with William Shatner; and the Travel Channel's Mysteries at the Museum.

Horowitz has also appeared on seasons one and two of the History Channel show The UnBelievable with Dan Aykroyd. In an interview in November 2024 with Decider, Aykroyd noted, "I love Mitch Horowitz. He's great... I kind of relate to him in a way."

Horowitz hosted, co-wrote, and produced the 2022 documentary The Kybalion, directed by Ronni Thomas and shot on location in Egypt. He appeared on seasons I and II of Shudder's Cursed Films on AMC+, a selection of SXSW 2020.

He is also featured in documentaries including Woodlands Dark and Days Bewitched: A History of Folk Horror, directed by Kier-La Janisse, a selection of SXSW 2021.

Horowitz played a newscaster in the Paramount feature film My Animal, directed by Jacqueline Castel, a selection of the 2023 Sundance Film Festival.

He hosts the Discovery/HBO Max series Alien Encounters: Fact or Fiction, which premiered June 2024 and evaluates people's self-reported experiences with UFOs and alien life.

In September 2024, Horowitz became part of the cast of the Shudder horror series V/H/S/Beyond, playing the role of a historical commentator. Beginning in October 2024, he appears on the MGM+ miniseries Beyond: UFOS and the Unknown.

== Publishing ==
Horowitz was a vice-president at Penguin Random House and editor-in-chief of TarcherPerigee, its imprint focused on spirituality and metaphysics. Horowitz published titles in world religion, esoterica, and the metaphysical, as well as works in philosophy, social thought and politics, including Catching the Big Fish: Meditation, Consciousness, and Creativity by director David Lynch, 2012: The Return of Quetzalcoatl by Daniel Pinchbeck and Weapons of Mass Deception: The Uses of Propaganda in Bush's War on Iraq by Sheldon Rampton and John Stauber. He has published a number of works by religious scholar Jacob Needleman, including The American Soul: Rediscovering the Wisdom of the Founders and What is God? While at Tarcher, he oversaw the work of writer-editor Mike Solana, who later became a vice president at Peter Thiel's Founders Fund.

Serving as guest host of the public radio program Interfaith Voices, Horowitz in 2016 interviewed David Lynch about Transcendental Meditation, ideas, and creativity.

In 2003, Horowitz published a trade-sized "Reader's Edition" of The Secret Teachings of All Ages by Manly P. Hall. In 2022, he introduced Taschen's reissue of Hall's original work.

Horowitz has edited and introduced anthologies including Neville Goddard's Final Lectures and The Secret History of America by Manly P. Hall.

Horowitz has also published work by scholar of religion Jeffrey J. Kripal, computer scientist and UFO theorist Jacques Vallée, memoirist and novelist Whitley Strieber, and historian Gary Lachman.

Horowitz has narrated audiobooks including Alcoholics Anonymous; Raven: The Untold Story of the Rev. Jim Jones and His People; and The Jefferson Bible.

Horowitz wrote a historical introduction to Sacred Bones Records' 2020 reissue of the 1905 illustrated occult work Thought Forms: A Record of Clairvoyant Investigation by Annie Besant and Charles Webster Leadbeater.

As an editor at the Simon & Schuster imprint The Free Press in 1996, Horowitz published The Case for Mars by Robert Zubrin, and acquired a book proposal by political commentator Tucker Carlson before Carlson went on to co-host CNN's Crossfire. Carlson did not complete the project but sent Horowitz a personal check returning the advance, which Horowitz characterized as "honorable."

Also in 1996, Horowitz reissued the anti-war satire Report from Iron Mountain in cooperation with its original authors and conceptualizers Victor Navasky, Marvin Kitman, Richard Lingeman, and chief writer Leonard Lewin. Journalist Phil Tinline wrote in his 2025 history of the book, Ghosts of Iron Mountain, that in correspondence about Navasky's foreword to the reissue, "its editor, Mitch Horowitz, encouraged him to address this question of why a left-wing satire had inspired the right. Were the two sides getting similar messages from it? Did it 'expose a sort of cognitive netherworld or fault-line of paranoia' that the two sides had in common?"

== Personal life ==
Horowitz has two sons and lives in Greenpoint, Brooklyn. He is married to filmmaker Jacqueline Castel.

== Selected bibliography ==
- Occult America: The Secret History of How Mysticism Shaped Our Nation (2009)
- One Simple Idea: How Positive Thinking Reshaped Modern Life (2014)
- Mind as Builder: The Positive-Mind Metaphysics of Edgar Cayce (2017)
- The Miracle Club: How Thoughts Become Reality (2018)
- The Miracle Habits: The Secret of Turning Your Moments Into Miracles (2020)
- Daydream Believer: Unlocking the Ultimate Power of Your Mind (2022)
- Uncertain Places: Essays on Occult and Outsider Experiences (2022)
- Modern Occultism: History, Theory, and Practice (2023)
- Happy Warriors: The Lives and Ideas of the Positive-Mind Mystics (2024)
- Practical Magick: Ancient Tradition and Modern Practice (2025)
- The Sixth Sense: Napoleon Hill's Ultimate Step to Success (2025)
- Esoterika: Formulas Against the False Self (2026)
