= Alien Encounters: Fact or Fiction =

American reality television series

- Starring: Mitch Horowitz, Chrissy Newton
- Country of origin: United States
- Original language: English
- No. of seasons: 1
- No. of episodes: 7

Production
- Executive producers: Mark Marinaccio, Kevin Bartel, Jeff Garcia
- Production location: Roswell, New Mexico
- Running time: 60 minutes
- Production company: Best Productions LLC

Original release
- Network: Discovery Channel
- Release: June 19, 2024 – present

Alien Encounters: Fact or Fiction is a UFO-themed television series on the Discovery Channel that evaluates people's self-reported experiences with UFOs and aliens. It premiered on Wednesday, June 19, 2024 at 10:00 p.m. ET/PT and is hosted by author Mitch Horowitz and podcaster Chrissy Newton, who review scientific data and research to analyze guests' encounters with extraterrestrial activity and determine whether or not they are explained. In one episode, geologist Frank Kimbler provides one of 20 small pieces of metal that he recovered from the outskirts of Roswell, New Mexico, one of which was tested and confirmed it to be "100-percent pure aluminum," which experts suggest was "compelling evidence" that prove that aliens crashed in the area decades earlier.

One review stated: "Utilizing scientific data and research, they aim to uncover whether these experiences can be rationally explained [and offer] viewers an intriguing perspective." In an interview about the show, Horowitz pointed to addressing the challenge of "overly credulous" tendencies among the UFO community, while giving a fair hearing to the legitimate evidence and experiences of witnesses, examining each account on the merits. Prior to Roswell's 2024 annual UFO Festival, Horowitz noted that the guests hailed from all over North America and Latin America, and stated, "I think what is seen in the spotlight that's placed on the experiencers is how canny and capable so many of these people are," as many of them have a background in technology, engineering, and military service. The seventh episode of the season, "Crash in California," airs on August 7, and consists first of a sighting in Nevada and then of an investigation of a possible UFO crash site in Needles, California.
