= Frank B. Robinson =

American writer

Frank Bruce "Doc" Robinson (1886 – 19 October 1948) was an American New Thought author and spiritual leader. A pharmacist in Moscow, Idaho, Robinson was the son of an English Baptist minister. He studied in a Canadian Bible school but later rejected organized religion in favor of the New Thought Movement. In 1928, he founded the spiritual movement Psychiana. Robinson was also publisher of the Idahoan newspaper. Psychiana's International Headquarters building still stands on 2nd Street, as does Robinson's house on Howard Street. Robinson's most lasting impact on Moscow and Latah County is the eponymous Robinson Park, for which he donated the land.
