= Manly P. Hall =

Canadian-American philosopher and writer (1901–1990)

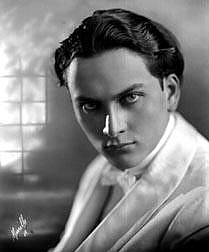
- Hall in the late 1920s
- Born: 18 March 1901; Peterborough, Ontario, Canada
- Died: 29 August 1990 (aged 89); Los Angeles, California, U.S.
- Occupations: Philosopher, writer
- Spouse(s): Marie Bauer (m. 1950) Fay Lee (m. 1930; died 1941)
- Parent: William Samuel Hall
- Writing career
- Period: 1919–1990
- Subject: Philosophy
- Notable works: The Secret Teachings of All Ages; The Lost Keys Of Freemasonry

Manly Palmer Hall (18 March 1901 – 29 August 1990) was a Canadian writer, lecturer, astrologer, and mystic. Over his 70-year career he gave thousands of lectures and published over 150 volumes, of which the best known is The Secret Teachings of All Ages (1928). In 1934, he founded the Philosophical Research Society in Los Angeles.

== Early life ==
Hall was born in 1901 in Peterborough, Ontario, Canada, to Louise Antist (née Palmer) Hall (1877–1953), a chiropractor and member of the Rosicrucian Fellowship, and William S. Hall, a dentist. Hall is said to have never known his father. In 1919, Hall moved to Los Angeles to reunite with his birth mother who was living in Santa Monica. After moving in with her, he very soon after became drawn to mysticism, esoteric philosophies and their underlying principles.

== Career ==
In 1919, Hall took over as preacher of the Church of the People, located at Trinity Auditorium in downtown Los Angeles. Less than a year later, Hall booked his first lecture on the topic of reincarnation. Hall was ordained a minister in the Church of the People on 17 May 1923. Only a few days after his ordination, he was elected "permanent pastor" of the church. His first publications consisted of two small pamphlets, The Breastplate of the High Priest (1920) and Wands and Serpents (1927). Between 1922 and 1923 he wrote three books: The Initiates of the Flame (1922), The Ways of the Lonely Ones (1922), and The Lost Keys of Freemasonry (1923).

During the early 1920s, Caroline Lloyd and her daughter Estelle, members of a family who controlled an oil field in Ventura County, California, began sending a large portion of their income to Hall. With these funds, Hall traveled throughout Europe and Asia to study the lives, customs, and religions of the people in those regions. While visiting London in the early 1930s, Hall acquired from an auction agent at Sotheby's a substantial collection of rare books and manuscripts about alchemy and esotericism. Owing to economic conditions resulting from the Great Depression, he acquired the collection for below the typical market price. Caroline Lloyd died in 1946 and in her will left Hall a house, $15,000 in cash, and an annual percentage of her family's oil field shares, valued at approximately $10,000 per year, for the next 38 years.

=== The Secret Teachings of All Ages ===
By 1928, Hall had become sufficiently known and respected as an interpreter and lecturer of many ancient writings. He utilized print and word-of-mouth advertising to solicit public funding to finance his book The Secret Teachings of All Ages (1928), and hired John Augustus Knapp to create full color illustrations, and black and white drawings. The HS Crocker Company of San Francisco agreed to publish his work if he could secure the interest of book designer John Henry Nash, who had worked as a printer for the Vatican.

After The Secret Teachings of All Ages circulated, Hall became increasingly influential on the metaphysical movement sweeping the United States. His book challenged assumptions about society's spiritual roots making readers view their spirituality in new and diverse ways. He subtitled his book to "the proposition that concealed within the emblematic figures, allegories and rituals of the ancients is a secret doctrine concerning the inner mysteries of life, which doctrine has been preserved in toto among a small band of initiated minds." As one writer put it: "The result was a gorgeous, dreamlike book of mysterious symbols, concise essays and colorful renderings of mythical beasts rising out of the sea, and angelic beings with lions' heads presiding over somber initiation rites in torch-lit temples of ancestral civilizations that had mastered latent powers beyond the reach of modern man."

In 1988, Hall wrote: "The greatest knowledge of all time should be available to the twentieth century not only in the one shilling editions of the Bohn Library in small type and shabby binding, but in a book that would be a monument, not merely a coffin. John Henry Nash agreed with me."

=== Further publications and lectures ===
After the success of The Secret Teachings of All Ages Hall went on to publish several books, the major of which included, The Dionysian Artificers (1936), Freemasonry of the Ancient Egyptians (1937), and Masonic Orders of Fraternity (1950). Continuing his career into his seventies and beyond, Hall delivered approximately 8,000 lectures in the United States and abroad, authored over 200 books and essays, and wrote countless magazine articles. Hall appears in the introduction to the 1938 film When Were You Born, a murder mystery that uses astrology as a key plot point. Hall wrote the original story for the film (screenplay by Anthony Coldeway) and is also credited as the narrator.

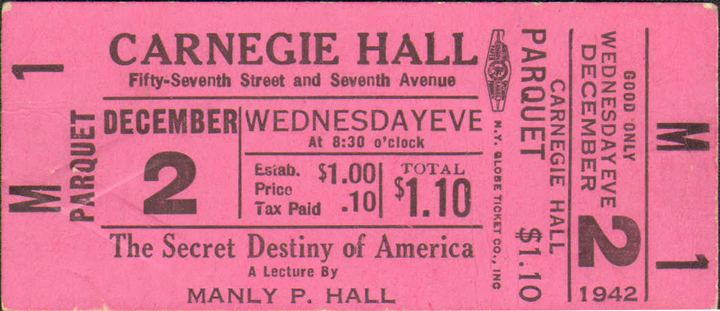
Ticket for Manly P. Hall at Carnegie Hall, 2 December 1942

In 1942, Hall spoke to a large audience at Carnegie Hall, on "The Secret Destiny of America," which later became a book of the same title. Through a series of stories, his book alleged that a secret order of philosophers created the idea of America as a country based on religious freedom and self-governance. In one of the stories that Hall cites as evidence of America's exceptionalism, he claims that an angel was present at the signing of the Declaration of Independence, and inspiring them with God's words. President Ronald Reagan is reported to have adopted ideas and phrasing from The Secret Destiny of America (1944) in his speeches and essays for his allegorical use of the City upon a Hill. Historian Mitch Horowitz has brought attention specifically to Reagan telling the story of an "unknown speaker" at the signing of the Declaration of Independence and America's assignation "to fulfill a mission to advance man a further step in his climb from the swamps."

Hall returned in 1945 for another well-attended lecture at Carnegie Hall, titled: "Plato's Prophecy of Worldwide Democracy".

== Personal life ==
Hall and his followers went to extreme lengths to keep any rumors or information that could tarnish his image from being publicized, and little is known about his first marriage. On 28 April 1930, Hall married Fay B. deRavenne, who had been his secretary for five years. The marriage was not a happy one; his friends never discussed it, and Hall removed virtually all information about her from his papers following her suicide on 22 February 1941. Following a long friendship, on 5 December 1950, Hall married Marie Schweikert Bauer (following her divorce from George Bauer), and the marriage, though stressful, was happier than his first. Marie Schweikert Bauer Hall died 21 April 2005.

In 1934, Hall founded the Philosophical Research Society (PRS) in Los Angeles, California, a nonprofit organisation dedicated to the study of religion, mythology, metaphysics, and the occult. The PRS still maintains a research library of over 50,000 volumes, and also sells and publishes metaphysical and spiritual books, mostly those authored by Hall. He held centuries-old books, such as first editions of H.P. Blavatsky's The Secret Doctrine (1888), with her handwritten notes, as well as alchemical and Rosicrucian codices, and a triangular cipher manuscript attributed to the Count of St. Germain. After his death, some of Manly Hall's rare alchemy books were sold to keep the PRS in operation. "Acquisition of the Manly Palmer Hall Collection in 1995 provided the Getty Research Institute with one of the world's leading collections of alchemy, esoterica, and hermetica."

Hall was a Knight Patron of the Masonic Research Group of San Francisco, with which he was associated for a number of years prior to his Masonic affiliations. On 28 June 1954, Hall was initiated as a Freemason into Jewel Lodge No. 374, San Francisco (now the United Lodge); passed 20 September 1954; and raised 22 November 1954. He took the Scottish Rite Degrees a year later. He later received his 32° in the Valley of San Francisco AASR (SJ). On 8 December 1973 (45 years after writing The Secret Teachings of All Ages), Hall was recognized as a 33° Mason (the second highest honor conferred by the Supreme Council of the Scottish Rite) at a ceremony held at the Philosophical Research Society (PRS).

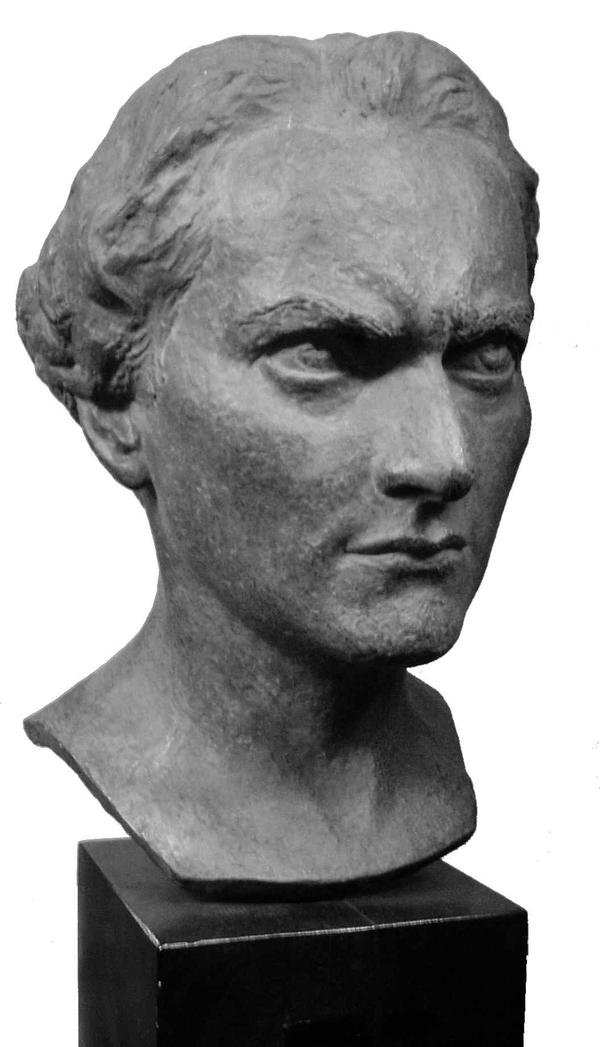
Bust of Manly Hall, artist unknown

Dubbed the "Sage of Los Angeles", Hall once wrote scripts for Hollywood film studios, and as a result became friendly with numerous prominent figures in public life, the arts, and many professions. He was a close friend of the original Dracula actor, Bela Lugosi, and country singer John Denver, and he was said to be on friendly terms with former actor and future President of the United States, Ronald Reagan, who, according to Hall's fellow lecturer at the Philosophical Research Society, Stephan A. Hoeller, even visited him at his office. He was also friends with Elvis Presley, with whom he exchanged frequent phone calls.

== Death ==
Hall died on August 29, 1990, at the age of 89, during a vacation trip with his wife, Marie Bauer. The circumstances surrounding his death were suspicious, with his wife suspecting a plot devised by Hall's assistant at the Philosophical Research Society, Daniel Fritz, who made Hall rewrite his will only six days prior to his death; the mystery of Hall's death was never fully solved.

== Selected works ==
Manly P. Hall published over 150 books and essays in his lifetime, here follows a short selection of notable works.

=== Books ===
- The Initiates of the Flame. Los Angeles: Premier Printing Company. 1922. pp. 1–89. OL 6651369M.
- The Lost Keys of Freemasonry. New York: Macoy Publishing and Masonic Supply Co. 1923 – via Wikisource.
- The Secret Teachings of All Ages. Los Angeles: John Henry Nash. 1928.
- Lectures on Ancient Philosophy: An Introduction to the Study and Application of Rational Procedure (PDF). Los Angeles: The Hall Publishing Company. 1929. pp. 1–513.
- Melchizedek and the Mystery of Fire: A Treatise in Three Parts (PDF). San Francisco: Hall Publishing Company. 1929.
- The Occult Anatomy of Man: To Which Is Added a Treatise on Occult Masonry (PDF). Los Angeles: Philosophical Research Society. 1937.
- How to Understand Your Bible. Los Angeles: Philosophical Research Society. 1942. pp. 1–239.
- The Secret Destiny of America (PDF). Los Angeles: Philosophical Research Society. 1944.
- The Blessed Angels: A Monograph. Los Angeles: Philosophical Research Society. 1980. pp. 1–55.
- Meditation Symbols in Eastern & Western Mysticism : Mysteries of the Mandala. Los Angeles: Philosophical Research Society. 1988. pp. xi, 1–249.

=== Periodicals ===
- The All-Seeing Eye. Los Angeles: Manly P. Hall (1923, 1924), Hall Publishing Company (1925–1931). OCLC 12378332.
- A Monthly Letter. Los Angeles: The Phoenix Press. 1934–1949. OCLC 122500060.

=== Archival Collections ===
- Manly Palmer Hall collection of alchemical manuscripts, circa 1500-1825
  - Box 16 Manuscripts
  - Box 25 Manuscripts
  - Box 36 Manuscripts

=== Early Essays and Monthly Letters ===
- c. 1920–1923, Symbolic Essays
- c. 1926–1927, Noah and His Wonderful Ark
- c. 1930–1940s, Atlantis: An Interpretation
