= Le Petit Versailles =

Community garden in Manhattan, New York

- Interactive map of Le Petit Versailles
- Location: 247 E. 2nd Street, between Avenues B and C, New York City
- Coordinates: 40°43′19.873″N 73°59′1.854″W
- Area: 1,588 ft^{2}
- Established: 1996
- Website: Allied Productions site

Le Petit Versailles is a New York City community garden on the Lower East Side of Manhattan. It was established in 1996 by artists Peter Cramer and Jack Waters, who wanted to create a queer public space in the city. The garden is a part of the NYC Department of Park's GreenThumb program. The garden regularly holds calls for proposals for artistic works or events and hosts community events such as exhibitions, readings, live performances, and film screenings.

== History ==
Peter Cramer and Jack Waters had been artistic collaborators in New York since the 1980s. They became co-directors of the ABC No Rio space after curating an art exhibition there together, and both joined the Visual AIDS collective. The garden site on 2nd Street had been an auto chop shop, before that was demolished. Cramer and Waters built the garden together, in 1996.

In the aftermath of September 11 attacks and the protests against the 2004 Republican National Convention in New York, the garden became a refuge and organizing space for activists. In 2006, the garden began broadcasting footage from its arts events on the Manhattan Neighborhood Network, a local public TV channel, as LPVTV.

== Gallery ==
Art at Le Petit Versailles
A Vision for the Future in Present Tense, Daniel Rothbart

Top detail on A Vision for the Future in Present Tense

Base detail on A Vision for the Future in Present Tense

Junk sculpture of a couple, artist unknown

Junk sculpture of a person with hoops, artist unknown

Junk sculpture of a woman with a birdhouse, artist unknown
