= St. Cecilia's Convent =

St. Cecilia's Convent may refer to:

- St. Cecilia's Convent, Batticaloa, a school in Sri Lanka
- St Cecilia's Convent Secondary School, a school in Malaysia
- St. Cecilia Church and Convent, New York City
