= Philosophical Research Society =

American nonprofit wisdom literature organization

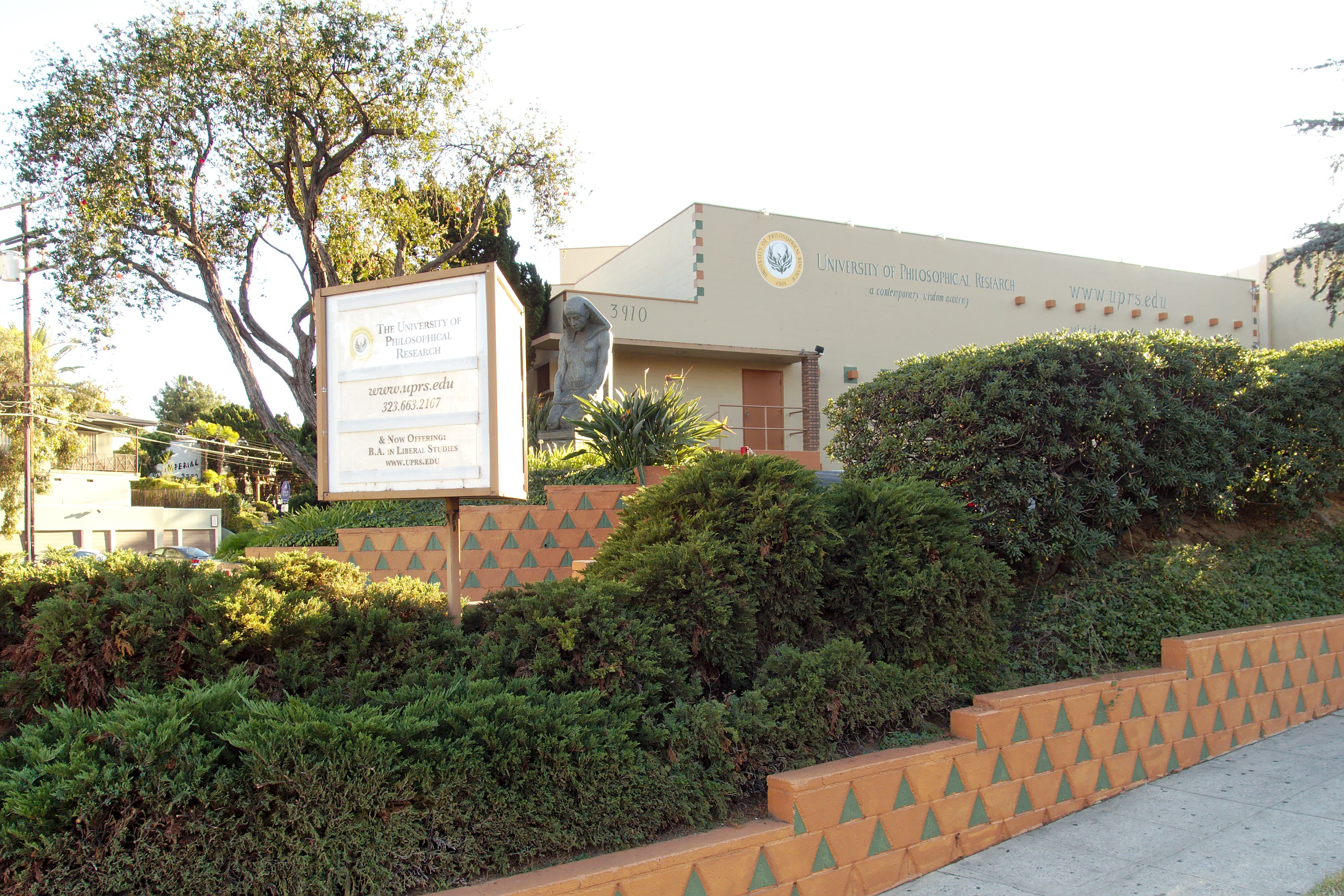
- Formation: 1934
- Founder: Manly P. Hall
- Headquarters: Los Feliz, Los Angeles, California

The Philosophical Research Society (PRS) is an American nonprofit organization founded in 1934, by Manly P. Hall, to promote the study of the world's wisdom literature, philosophy, comparative religion, mysticism and metaphysics. PRS is located at 3910 Los Feliz Blvd in Los Angeles. Hall believed the accumulated wisdom of mankind is the birthright of every individual and founded the facility to serve the general public to this end.

As of 2024, its president is John Pillsbury, who replaced the third president, Greg Salyer in 2022. Kelly Carmena is the current executive director. Salyer was a graduate of Emory University's Graduate Institute of the Liberal Arts. Following Mr. Hall's death in 1990, Obadiah Harris served as the second president and in 2001 opened the University of Philosophical Research, an accredited online university offering graduate programs in consciousness studies and transformational psychology and an undergraduate degree in liberal studies. PRS closed this university in 2019 in favor of offering non-degree courses and certificates with lower costs and greater access to seekers of wisdom.

PRS maintains a research library of over 50,000 volumes, and also sells and publishes metaphysical and esoteric books, mostly those authored by Hall. In 2018 PRS opened the Hansell Gallery to exhibit works of art that express the concept of wisdom in all of its forms. PRS offers a variety of events and lectures throughout the year that incorporate art, cultural studies, literature, philosophy, mythology, among others disciplines. Presenters have included Eliza Swann, lecturer-in-residence.

Its headquarters are in Los Angeles, California. The building at 3910 Los Feliz Boulevard in the Los Feliz neighborhood was designed by architect Robert Stacy-Judd and designated as a Los Angeles Historic Cultural Monument.

== Gallery ==
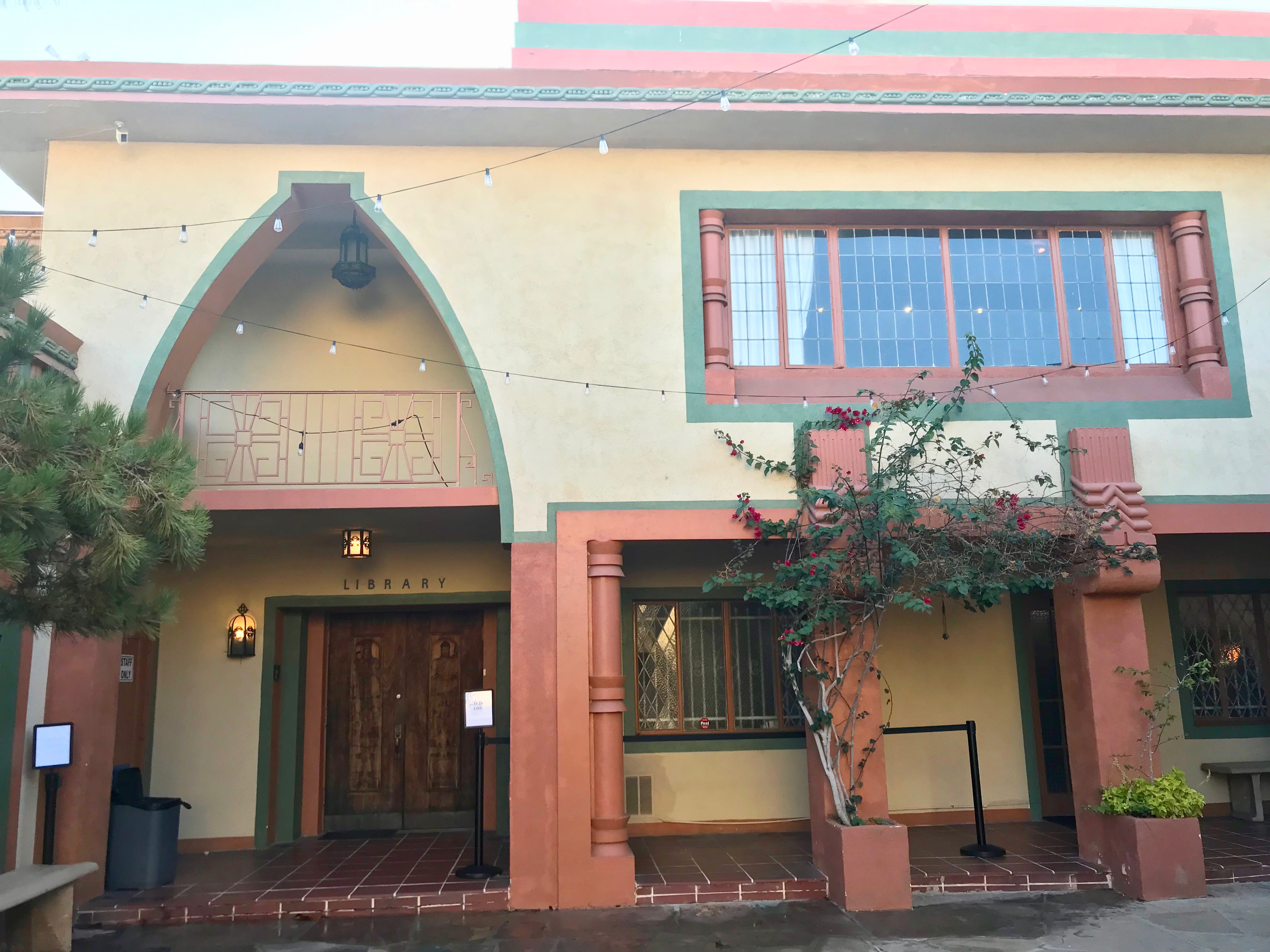
Mayan Revival library

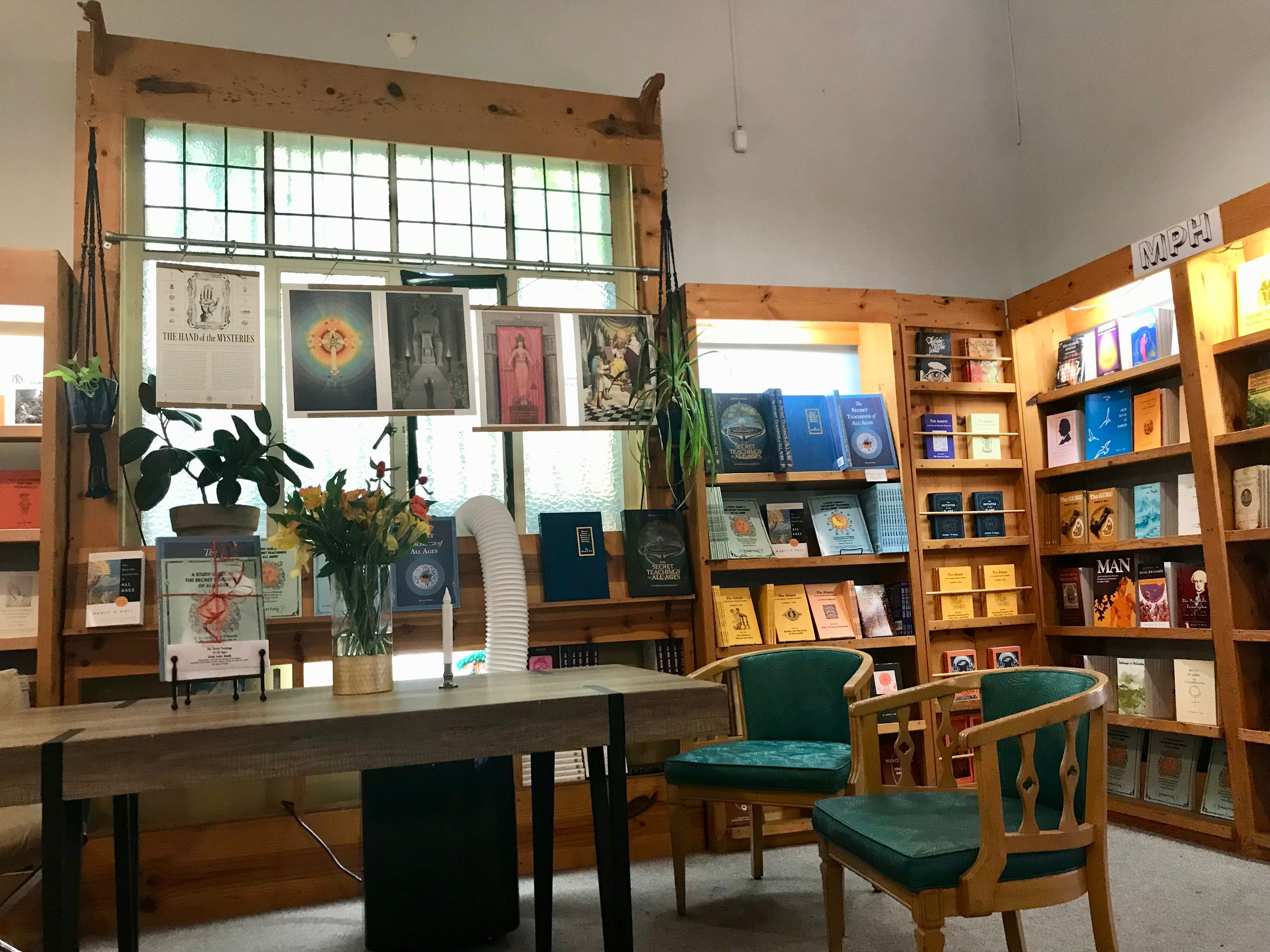
Bookshop

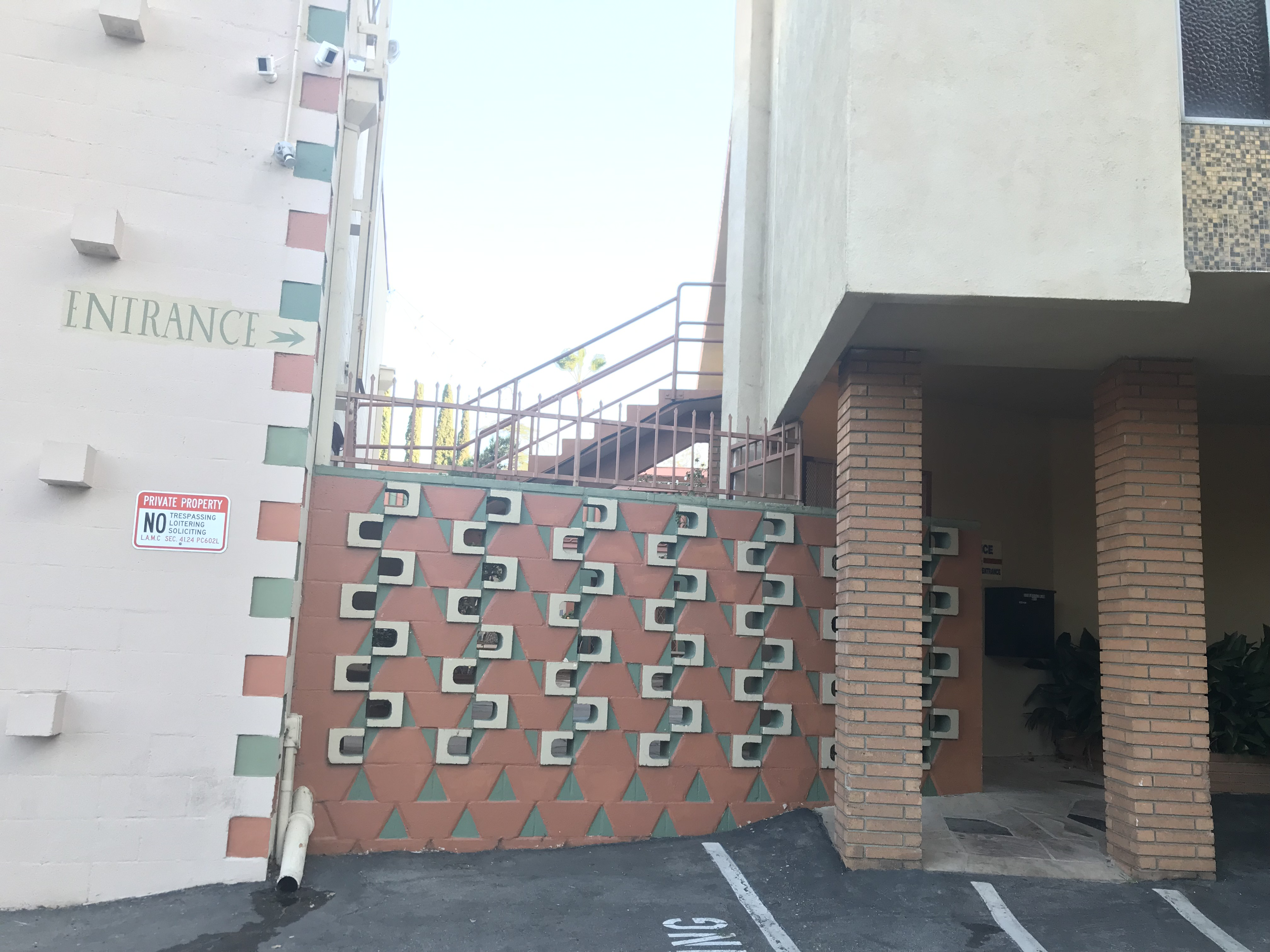
Front entrance

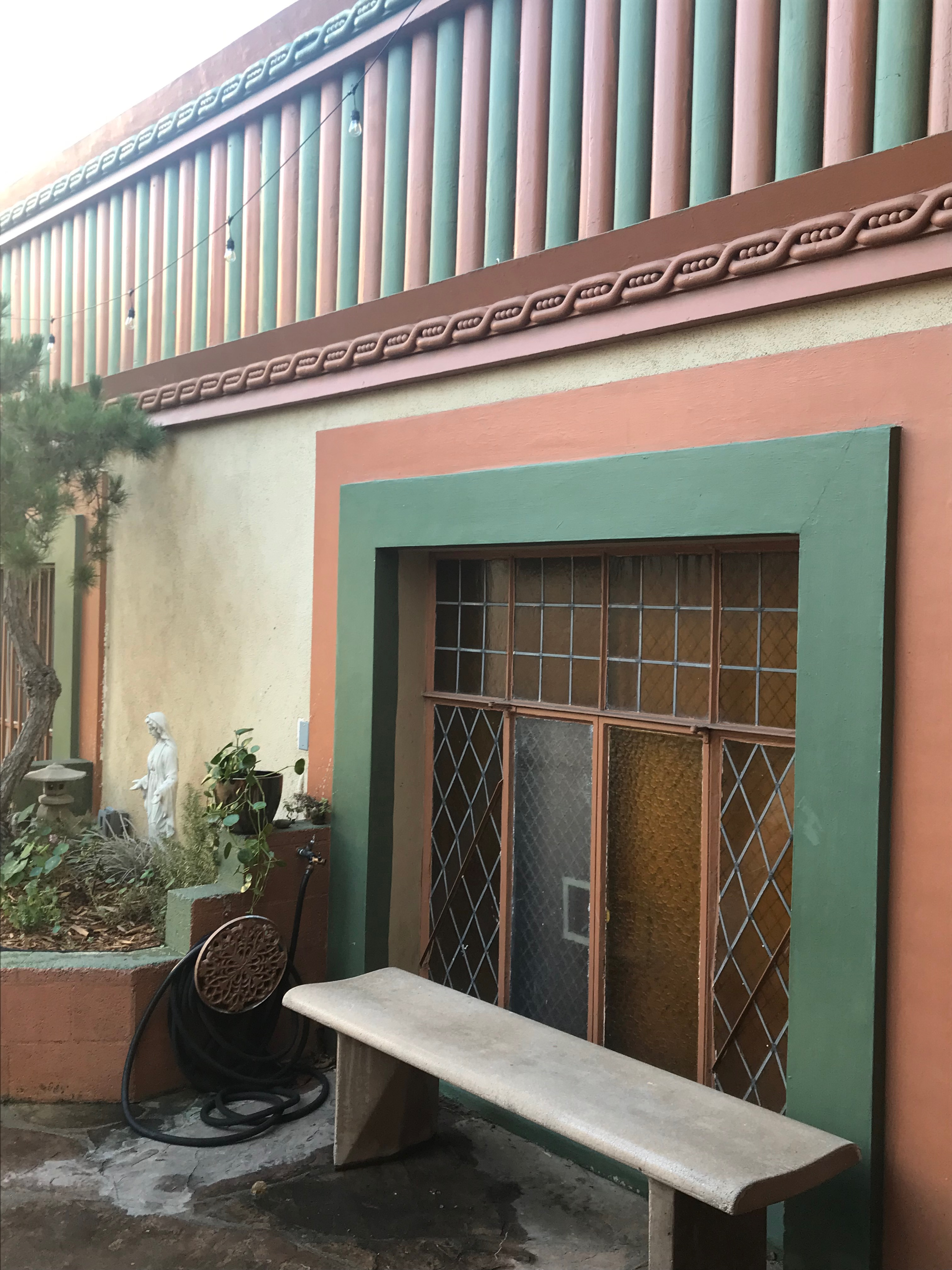
Courtyard bench

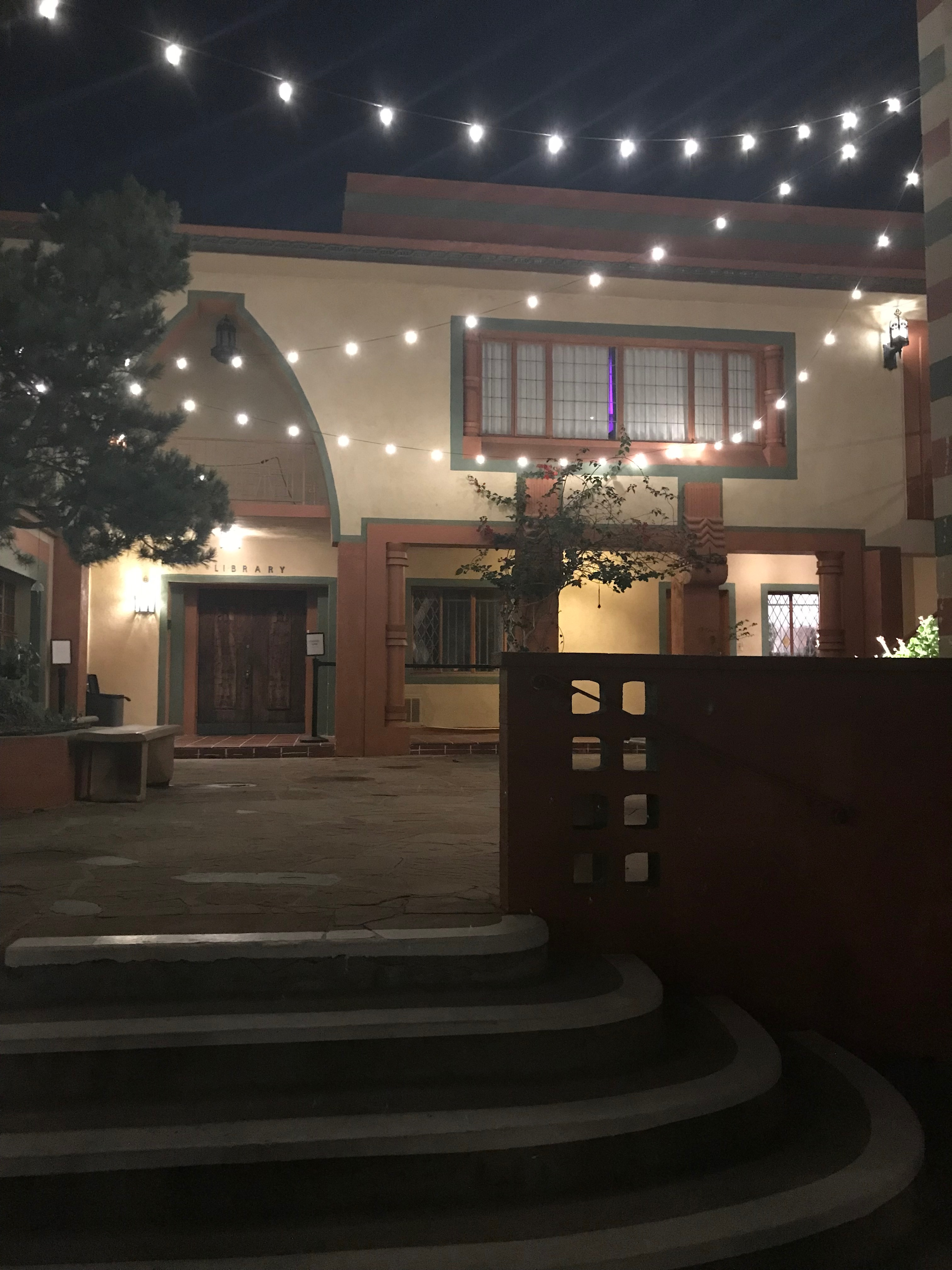
The library at night
