= Super Soul Sunday =

2011 American TV talk show

- Genre: Self-help
- Presented by: Oprah Winfrey
- Country of origin: United States
- Original language: English
- No. of seasons: 17
- No. of episodes: 186

Production
- Camera setup: Single
- Running time: 42 minutes
- Production companies: Harpo Studios; Super Soul Sunday, LLC

Original release
- Network: Oprah Winfrey Network
- Release: October 16, 2011 – December 19, 2021

Related
- The Oprah Winfrey Show; Oprah's Lifeclass

Super Soul Sunday is a self-help talk show hosted by Oprah Winfrey, which airs on the Oprah Winfrey Network. The series premiered on October 16, 2011, and ended on December 19, 2021.

== Format ==
Super Soul Sunday was designed to help viewers awaken to their best selves and discover a deeper connection to the world around them. Recognized by the National Academy of Television Arts and Sciences with Daytime Emmy Awards, the Alliance for Women in Media Foundation with a Gracie Award and the Religion Communicators Council with a Wilbur Award, Super Soul Sunday features conversations between Oprah and philosophers, authors, visionaries, and spiritual leaders. It presents an array of perspectives on what it means to be alive in today's world. Exploring themes and issues including happiness, personal fulfillment, spirituality and conscious living, guests who have appeared include: Elie Wiesel, Maya Angelou, Brené Brown, India Arie, Wayne Dyer, Gary Zukav, Iyanla Vanzant, Marianne Williamson, Phil Jackson, Ram Dass, Eckhart Tolle, Diana Nyad, Sarah Ban Breathnach, and Thích Nhất Hạnh.

== Oprah's SuperSoul Conversations Podcast (2017–2019) ==
On August 6, 2017 Oprah's SuperSoul Conversations podcast premiered, featuring interviews pulled from the Super Soul Sunday television show and new conversations recorded exclusively for the podcast. New conversations recorded exclusively for the podcast have featured such guests as: Reese Witherspoon, Mindy Kaling, Jimmy Kimmel, Amy Schumer, Phil McGraw, Will.i.am, Maria Shriver, former mayor of New Orleans Mitch Landrieu, Ralph Lauren, Tina Turner, Julia Roberts, and Michelle Obama.

On February 7, 2018, Winfrey hosted a live show for the podcast at the Apollo Theatre in New York City. The show was hosted by Jessica Williams and Phoebe Robinson of 2 Dope Queens and featured interviews with Jordan Peele, Stephen Colbert, Salma Hayek Pinault, Trevor Noah, Lin-Manuel Miranda, and Yara Shahidi.

On February 8, 2019, Winfrey hosted Oprah's SuperSoul Conversations from Times Square, another live show for the podcast and television series at PlayStation Theater in New York City. The show featured interviews with Bradley Cooper, Michael B. Jordan, Beto O'Rourke, Melinda Gates, and Lisa Borders.

== Super Soul on discovery+ (2021) ==
On March 6, 2021, a new streaming series hosted by Winfrey called SuperSoul premiered on the discovery+ streaming platform. Season one episodes included interviews with Andra Day, Chip and Joanna Gaines, Priyanka Chopra Jonas, Sharon Stone, Jon Meacham, Dr. Bruce Perry, and Julianna Margulies.

== Episodes ==
=== Series overview ===
Season	Episodes	Timeslot (EST)	Original Airing	
Season	Episodes	Timeslot (EST)	Season premiere	Season finale
1	8	Sunday 11:00 AM	October 16, 2011	January 1, 2012
2	11	Sunday 11:00 AM	February 12, 2012	May 6, 2012
3	19	Sunday 11:00 AM	June 3, 2012	October 21, 2012
4	7	Sunday 11:00 AM	November 4, 2012	December 16, 2012
5	8	Sunday 11:00 AM	February 3, 2013	March 24, 2013
6	8	Sunday 11:00 AM	May 12, 2013	June 30, 2013
7	14	Sunday 11:00 AM	September 22, 2013	December 22, 2013
8	13	Sunday 11:00 AM	March 23, 2014	June 15, 2014
9	13	Sunday 11:00 AM	September 7, 2014	December 21, 2014
10	13	Sunday 11:00 AM	February 8, 2015	May 3, 2015
11	12	Sunday 7:00 PM	September 27, 2015	December 13, 2015
12	8	Sunday 11:00 AM & 7:00 PM	March 13, 2016	May 1, 2016
13	12	Sunday 11:00 AM & 7:00 PM	August 7, 2016	October 23, 2016
14	15	Sunday 11:00 AM & 7:00 PM	April 16, 2017	November 12, 2017
15	10	Sunday 11:00 AM	June 10, 2018	May 5, 2019
16	13	Sunday 11:00 AM	May 19, 2019	October 26, 2019
17	9	Sunday 11:00 AM	March 29, 2020	December 19, 2021

=== Season 1 (2011–12) ===
No. in series	No. in season	Original air date	Title	Guest	Additional Segments
1	1	October 16, 2011	The World Beyond	Jonas Elrod	Wake Up
2	2	October 23, 2011	Crazy Sexy Life	Kris Carr	Kathy Freston discusses optimum health.
3	3	October 30, 2011	Finding Beauty	Rainn Wilson	A Man Named Pearl
4	4	November 6, 2011	Earth Love		The world of plants from Life; a family gives up modern conveniences for one year.
5	5	November 13, 2011	Unexpected Gifts	Jill Bolte Taylor	Emmanuel's Gift
6	6	November 20, 2011	The Journey Within	Elizabeth Gilbert	Iyanla Vanzant discusses letting go of anger.
7	7	November 27, 2011	Super Soul Marathon	Wayne Dyer, Reverend Ed Bacon, Mark Nepo	SoulPancake's latest
8	8	January 1, 2012	What's Right with the World?	Tom Shadyac	Documentary I Am; the boy Oprah could not forget; SoulPancake's latest.

=== Season 2 (2012) ===
No. in series	No. in season	Original air date	Title	Guest	Additional Segments
9	1	February 12, 2012	Feeling the Love	Gary Zukav, Linda Francis	A segment on Love Etc. director Jill Andresevic's documentary following five couples over the course of a year.
10	2	February 19, 2012	Debbie Ford: Out of the Shadows	Debbie Ford	Short film The Shadow Effect; SoulPancake's latest
11	3	February 26, 2012	Lost & Found	Daniel H. Pink	The documentary Lost In Woonsocket, about a humanitarian experiment attempting to help two homeless alcoholics.
12	4	March 4, 2012	Open Your Heart	Llewellyn Vaughan-Lee	Love Hate Love, a documentary following families of victims of the September 11, 2001, terrorist attack, the July 7, 2005 attack in London and the 2002 nightclub bombing in Bali, Indonesia.
13	5	March 11, 2012	Finding Your Authentic Power with Gary Zukav	Gary Zukav	Music creates unity in the British television series What About Me.
14	6	March 25, 2012	Wayne Dyer: Living with Grace	Wayne Dyer	A segment on the British TV series What About Me? features spoken and musical ruminations on love, need and aging gracefully around the world.
15	7	April 1, 2012	The Shift	Wayne Dyer	Self-help author Wayne Dyer appears as himself in "The Shift," a drama about a group of Northern Californians searching for meaning in life beyond ambition and success. The cast includes Portia de Rossi.
16	8	April 15, 2012	Bestselling Author Daniel Pink: The Spark Within	Daniel H. Pink	N/A
17	9	April 22, 2012	Oprah and Ram Dass: Fierce Grace	Ram Dass	N/A
18	10	April 29, 2012	Oprah and Deepak Chopra in India	Deepak Chopra	N/A
19	11	May 6, 2012	Oprah and Thích Nhất Hạnh: The Meaning of Mindfulness	Thích Nhất Hạnh	The Dhamma Brothers, a 2008 documentary about inmates in an Alabama prison whose lives change when they participate in a 10-day Buddhist meditation course.

=== Season 3 (2012) ===
No. in series	No. in season	Original air date	Title	Guest	Additional Segments
20	1	June 3, 2012	Focus Your Life	Iyanla Vanzant, Tony Robbins	N/A
21	2	June 10, 2012	Oprah and Sara Ban Breathnach: Losing Everything, Finding Yourself	Sara Ban Breathnach	N/A
22	3	June 17, 2012	Oprah and DeVon Franklin: Keeping the Faith in Hollywood	DeVon Franklin	N/A
23	4	June 24, 2012	Oprah and Caroline Myss: Intuition, Power and Grace	Caroline Myss	N/A
24	5	July 1, 2012	Living from the Core	T. D. Jakes, Deepak Chopra	N/A
25	6	July 8, 2012	Oprah and Actor Rainn Wilson: The Man Behind SoulPancake	Rainn Wilson	Short film: Framed
26	7	July 15, 2012	Oprah and Wayne Dyer in Maui	Wayne Dyer	N/A
27	8	July 22, 2012	Oprah's Book Club 2.0 Interview: Oprah and Author of Wild, Cheryl Strayed	Cheryl Strayed	N/A
28	9	July 29, 2012	Oprah and Marianne Williamson: 20 Years After 'A Return to Love'	Marianne Williamson	The Best of The Oprah Show: Marianne Williamson
29	10	August 5, 2012	Oprah and Michael Singer: The Untethered Soul	Michael Singer	The Best of The Oprah Show: Gary Zukav
30	11	August 12, 2012	Oprah and Jill Bolte Taylor: A Stroke of Insight	Jill Bolte Taylor	The Best of The Oprah Show: Power of Prayer
31	12	August 19, 2012	Oprah and Rev. Ed Bacon: Faith and Spirituality	Rev. Ed Bacon	The Best of The Oprah Show: Deepak Chopra
32	13	August 26, 2012	Why Oprah Loves Beasts of the Southern Wild	Benh Zeitlin, Dwight Henry, Quvenzhané Wallis	The Best of The Oprah Show: What's Your Spiritual Belief?
33	14	September 2, 2012	Oprah and Llewellyn Vaughan-Lee: Sufism and the Wisdom of the Heart	Llewellyn Vaughan-Lee	The Best of The Oprah Show: Eat, Pray, Love Phenomenon & When Life Breaks You Open
34	15	September 9, 2012	Oprah and Iyanla Vanzant: Soul to Soul, Part I	Iyanla Vanzant	The Best of The Oprah Show: Iyanla Vanzant
35	16	September 16, 2012	Oprah and Iyanla Vanzant: Soul to Soul, Part II	Iyanla Vanzant	The Best of The Oprah Show: Marianne Williamson
36	17	October 7, 2012	Oprah and Debbie Ford: Shadows, Light & Courage	Debbie Ford	N/A
37	18	October 21, 2012	Oprah and Gary Zukav: The Essence of The Seat of the Soul	Gary Zukav	Oprah, Gary Zukav and Linda Francis: Spiritual Partnerships, The Best of The Oprah Show: A Conversation with Gary Zukav
38	19	October 28, 2012	Oprah and Daniel Pink: A Whole New Mind	Daniel H. Pink	N/A

=== Season 4 (2012) ===
No. in series	No. in season	Original air date	Title	Guest	Additional Segments
39	1	November 4, 2012	Meditation 101 with Deepak Chopra	Deepak Chopra	The Best of The Oprah Show: Gary Zukav and Emotional Awareness; The Best of The Oprah Show: The Power of Prayer
40	2	November 11, 2012	Oprah and Eckhart Tolle: Being in the Now	Eckhart Tolle	The Best of The Oprah Show: Memorable Thinkers; The Best of The Oprah Show: What's Your Spiritual Belief?
41	3	November 18, 2012	Oprah and Three New Voices: Next Generation Spiritual Thinkers	Mastin Kipp, Gabrielle Bernstein, and Marie Forleo	The Best of The Oprah Show: You Were My Inspiration; The Best of The Oprah Show: Eat, Pray, Love Phenomenon
42	4	November 25, 2012	Oprah and Jean Houston: The Hero's Journey	Jean Houston	The Best of The Oprah Show: Gary Zukav On Real Power; The Best of The Oprah Show: Gratitude Stories
43	5	December 2, 2012	Oprah and Neurosurgeon Eben Alexander: Proof of Heaven	Dr. Eben Alexander	Oprah & Jill Bolte Taylor: A Stroke of Insight; The Best of The Oprah Show: The Law of Attraction: Real Life Stories
44	6	December 9, 2012	Oprah and Nobel Prize Winner Elie Wiesel: Living With an Open Heart	Elie Wiesel	The Best of The Oprah Show: Oprah and Elie Wiesel at Auschwitz; The Best of The Oprah Show: Remembering Your Spirit with Caroline Myss
45	7	December 16, 2012	Soul to Soul: Asking Life's Big Questions	Deepak Chopra, Marianne Williamson, Eckhart Tolle, Gary Zukav, Wayne Dyer, Iyanla Vanzant	Oprah and Rainn Wilson Present SoulPancake: Love

=== Season 5 (2013) ===
No. in series	No. in season	Original air date	Title	Guest	Additional Segments
46	1	February 3, 2013	Oprah's Book Club 2.0: Oprah and Ayana Mathis, Author of "The Twelve Tribes of Hattie"	Ayana Mathis	In Deep Shift with Jonas Elrod; Oprah and Rainn Wilson Present SoulPancake: Love
47	2	February 10, 2013	Oprah and Nate Berkus: The Things That Matter, Part I	Nate Berkus	The Best of The Oprah Show: How to Make Love Last; The Best of The Oprah Show: Gary Zukav on Fear and Surrendering
48	3	February 17, 2013	Oprah and Nate Berkus: The Things That Matter, Part II	Nate Berkus	Why Oprah Loves Beasts of the Southern Wild; The Best of The Oprah Show: There Are Angels Around Us; You Are Beautiful: The Little Sticker That Started a Worldwide Phenomenon
49	4	February 24, 2013	Oprah and Panache Desai: Change Your Energy, Change Your Life	Panache Desai	Oprah and Debbie Ford: Shadows, Light & Courage; The Best of The Oprah Show: Were You Here Before
50	5	March 3, 2013	Oprah and Don Miguel Ruiz: The Four Agreements	Don Miguel Ruiz	Oprah and Michael Singer: The Untethered Soul; The Best of The Oprah Show: Shirley MacLaine: Out on a Limb
51	6	March 10, 2013	Oprah and Dr. Robin Smith: The Hungry Soul	Dr. Robin Smith	Oprah and DeVon Franklin: Keeping the Faith in Hollywood; Meditation 101 with Deepak Chopra
52	7	March 17, 2013	Oprah and Brené Brown: Daring Greatly	Brené Brown	Oprah and Caroline Myss: Intuition, Power and Grace
53	8	March 24, 2013	Oprah and Brené Brown: Living With a Whole Heart	Brené Brown	Oprah and Sara Ban Breathnach: Losing Everything, Finding Yourself; The Best of The Oprah Show: Gary Zukav's Romantic Class

=== Season 6 (2013) ===
No. in series	No. in season	Original air date	Title	Guest	Additional Segments	Viewers (millions)
54	1	May 12, 2013	Oprah and Dr. Maya Angelou, Part I	Dr. Maya Angelou	Soul to Soul: Asking Life's Big Questions; The Best of The Oprah Show: Gary Zukav's Romantic Class	0.24
55	2	May 19, 2013	Oprah and Dr. Maya Angelou, Part II	Dr. Maya Angelou	Oprah and Nobel Prize Winner Elie Wiesel: Living With an Open Heart; The Best of The Oprah Show: Getting the Love You Want	0.33
56	3	May 26, 2013	The Bigger Picture with Oprah, Rev. Ed Bacon, Elizabeth Lesser, and Mark Nepo	Rev. Ed Bacon, Elizabeth Lesser, and Mark Nepo	Oprah and Panache Desai: Change Your Energy, Change Your Life; The Best of The Oprah Show: Spirit	
57	4	June 2, 2013	Oprah and Dr. Brian Weiss: Reincarnation, Past Lives and Miracles	Dr. Brian Weiss	Oprah and Thích Nhất Hạnh: The Meaning of Mindfulness; The Best of The Oprah Show: How to Forgive Yourself with Rabbi Irwin Kula	0.28
58	5	June 9, 2013	Oprah and Karen Armstrong: Losing Faith, Finding God	Karen Armstrong	The Best of The Oprah Show: Gary Zukav on Addiction & Temptation; Oprah and Jean Houston: The Hero's Journey	
59	6	June 16, 2013	Oprah and Coach Phil Jackson: The Zen Master	Phil Jackson	Oprah and Dr. Robin Smith: The Hungry Soul; Oprah and Daniel Pink: A Whole New Mind	
60	7	June 23, 2013	Oprah and Grammy Award Winner India.Arie: Spiritual Awakening	India.Arie	Oprah and Marianne Williamson: 20 Years After 'A Return to Love'; The Best of The Oprah Show: The Law of Attraction	
61	8	June 30, 2013	Oprah and Grammy-Award Winner India.Arie: How to Break Through	India.Arie	Oprah and Actor Rainn Wilson: The Man Behind SoulPancake; The Best of The Oprah Show: Gary Zukav on Emotional Awareness	

=== Season 7 (2013) ===
No. in series	No. in season	Original air date	Title	Guest	Additional Segments	Viewers (millions)
62	1	September 22, 2013	Oprah, Mariel Hemingway and Bobby Williams: Finding Soul Connections	Mariel Hemingway and Bobby Williams	Help Desk New York with Deepak Chopra; Help Desk Los Angeles with Reverend Ed Bacon	0.30
63	2	September 29, 2013	Oprah and Steven Pressfield: Unlocking Your Creative Genius	Steven Pressfield	The Best of The Oprah Show: Dr. Phil: Uncovering Your Authentic Self; Help Desk New York with Deepak Chopra; Help Desk Los Angeles with Reverend Ed Bacon	0.23
64	3	October 6, 2013	Oprah and Swimming Champion Diana Nyad: The Power of the Human Spirit	Diana Nyad	The Best of The Oprah Show: Our Disconnection from Our Children; The Best of The Oprah Show: Remembering Your Spirit with Caroline Myss	
65	4	October 13, 2013	Oprah and Swimming Champion Diana Nyad Part 2: Dare To Dream	Diana Nyad	The Best of The Oprah Show: Embraced by the Light; The Best of The Oprah Show: Gary Zukav on Fear and Surrendering	
66	5	October 20, 2013	Oprah and Bestselling Author Dani Shapiro: Finding Devotion	Dani Shapiro	The Best of The Oprah Show: Remembering Your Spirit; The Best of The Oprah Show: You Were My Inspiration	
67	6	October 27, 2013	Oprah and Bestselling Author Anne Lamott: The 3 Essential Prayers	Anne Lamott	The Best of The Oprah Show: Age of Miracles: The New Midlife; The Best of The Oprah Show: Gary Zukav on Real Power	
68	7	November 3, 2013	Oprah and Rob Bell: What We Talk About When We Talk About God	Rob Bell	Oprah and Neurosurgeon Eben Alexander: Proof of Heaven; Oprah and Steven Pressfield: Unlocking Your Creative Genius	
69	8	November 10, 2013	Oprah and Mark Nepo: "The Big C": Healing Body & Soul	Mark Nepo	The Best of The Oprah Show: Shirley MacLaine: Out on a Limb; The Best of The Oprah Show: Wisdom From the Dying	
70	9	November 17, 2013	Oprah and Mark Nepo: Listening to the Soul	Mark Nepo	The Best of The Oprah Show: Conversations with Oprah: Maya Angelou; The Best of The Oprah Show: Gary Zukav's Romantic Class 101	
71	10	November 24, 2013	Oprah and Sandy Hook Parents Francine and David Wheeler: After Sandy Hook	Francine and David Wheeler	The Best of The Oprah Show: When Life Breaks You Open; The Best of The Oprah Show: Gary Zukav's Romantic Class 102	
72	11	December 1, 2013	Oprah and Karen Armstrong: Twelve Steps to Compassion	Karen Armstrong	The Best of The Oprah Show: A No Holds Barred Conversation With Former Oprah Show Expert Iyanla Vanzant; The Best of The Oprah Show: How She Lost Her Marriage, Her House, Her Fortune: Iyanla Vanzant Part II	
73	12	December 8, 2013	Oprah and Starbucks CEO Howard Schultz: Building A Business with Soul	Howard Schultz	The Best of The Oprah Show: How Happy Are You?; The Best of The Oprah Show: The Law of Attraction: Real Life Stories	
74	13	December 15, 2013	Oprah and Jack Kornfield: Living Compassion	Jack Kornfield	The Best of The Oprah Show: Getting The Love You Want; The Best of The Oprah Show: Gratitude Stories	
75	14	December 22, 2013	Soul to Soul 2: Asking Life's Big Questions	Tina Turner, George Lucas	The Best of The Oprah Show: The Power of Prayer; The Best of The Oprah Show: Gary Zukav on Emotional Awareness	

=== Season 8 (2014) ===
No. in series	No. in season	Original air date	Title	Guest	Additional Segments
76	1	March 23, 2014	Oprah & Legendary Actress Shirley MacLaine: The Soul of a Star	Shirley MacLaine	Super Soul Sunday Presents Oprah & Eckhart Tolle: A New Earth- Chapter 1; The Best of The Oprah Show: How to Forgive Yourself
77	2	March 30, 2014	Oprah & Gary Zukav: Celebrating 25 Years of "The Seat of the Soul"	Gary Zukav	Super Soul Sunday Presents Oprah & Eckhart Tolle: A New Earth- Chapter 2; The Best of The Oprah Show: There Are Angels Around Us
78	3	April 6, 2014	Oprah & Filmmaker Louie Schwartzberg: The World Beyond What We Can See	Louie Schwartzberg	Super Soul Sunday Presents Oprah & Eckhart Tolle: A New Earth- Chapter 3; The Best of The Oprah Show: How to Forgive Yourself
79	4	April 13, 2014	Oprah & Book Club Author Sue Monk Kidd: The Soul of A Writer	Sue Monk Kidd	Super Soul Sunday Presents Oprah & Eckhart Tolle: A New Earth- Chapter 4; The Best of The Oprah Show: Are You Listening to Your Life?
80	5	April 20, 2014	Oprah & Adyashanti: Falling Into Grace	Adyashanti	Super Soul Sunday Presents Oprah & Eckhart Tolle: A New Earth- Chapter 5; The Best of The Oprah Show: Were You Here Before?
81	6	April 27, 2014	Oprah & Bestselling Author Elizabeth Lesser: The Healing Power of Love	Elizabeth Lesser	Super Soul Sunday Presents Oprah & Eckhart Tolle: A New Earth- Chapter 6; Oprah, Mariel Hemingway and Bobby Williams: Finding Soul Connections
82	7	May 4, 2014	Oprah & Tracy McMillan: Soulmates, Love & Marriage	Tracy McMillan	Super Soul Sunday Presents Oprah & Eckhart Tolle: A New Earth- Chapter 7; The Best of The Oprah Show: How to Make Love Last
83	8	May 11, 2014	Oprah & Arianna Huffington: Her Big Wake-Up Call	Arianna Huffington	Super Soul Sunday Presents Oprah & Eckhart Tolle: A New Earth- Chapter 8; The Best of The Oprah Show: Conversations with Oprah: Maya Angelou
84	9	May 18, 2014	Oprah & Shefali Tsabary: How to Raise A Conscious Child	Shefali Tsabary	Super Soul Sunday Presents Oprah & Eckhart Tolle: A New Earth- Chapter 9; The Best of The Oprah Show: How Happy Are You?
85	10	May 25, 2014	Oprah & Shawn Achor: The Secret of Happy People, Part I	Shawn Achor	Super Soul Sunday Presents Oprah & Eckhart Tolle: A New Earth- Chapter 10; The Best of The Oprah Show: Are You Listening To Your Life?
86	11	June 1, 2014	Oprah & Shawn Achor: The Secret of Happy People, Part II	Shawn Achor	Oprah and Dr. Maya Angelou, Part I; Oprah and Dr. Maya Angelou, Part II
87	12	June 8, 2014	Oprah & Whole Foods Co-Founder John Mackey: The Conscious CEO	John Mackey	Oprah and Sandy Hook Parents Francine and David Wheeler: After Sandy Hook; The Best of The Oprah Show: How To Make Love Last
88	13	June 15, 2014	Oprah & Russell Simmons: Success Through Stillness	Russell Simmons	The Best of The Oprah Show: Conversations with Oprah: Deepak Chopra; The Best of The Oprah Show: Memorable Thinkers

=== Season 9 (2014) ===
No. in series	No. in season	Original air date	Title	Guest	Additional Segments
89	1	September 7, 2014	Oprah & Paulo Coelho, Part I	Paulo Coelho	Help Desk New York City with Deepak Chopra; Help Desk Los Angeles with Reverend Ed Bacon
90	2	September 14, 2014	Oprah & Paulo Coelho, Part II	Paulo Coelho	Help Desk Washington with Iyanla Vanzant; The Best of The Oprah Show: Gary Zukav's Soul Stories
91	3	September 21, 2014	Alanis Morissette	Alanis Morissette	Help Desk Portland with Gary Zukav; The Best of The Oprah Show: Letters to Gary Zukav
92	4	September 28, 2014	Ali MacGraw	Ali MacGraw	Help Desk Los Angeles with DeVon Franklin; The Best of The Oprah Show: You Can Do Anything
93	5	October 5, 2014	Elizabeth Gilbert, Part I	Elizabeth Gilbert	Help Desk San Francisco with Carolyn Myss; The Best of The Oprah Show: Oprah and M. Scott Peck: The Road Less Traveled
94	6	October 12, 2014	Elizabeth Gilbert, Part II	Elizabeth Gilbert	Help Desk Long Beach with Michael Beckwith; The Best of The Oprah Show: Do You Believe?
95	7	October 19, 2014	Pema Chödrön	Pema Chödrön	Help Desk Portland with Cheryl Strayed; The Best of The Oprah Show: Best Life Week: Finding Your Spiritual Path
96	8	October 26, 2014	Madonna Badger	Madonna Badger	Help Desk New York with Gabrielle Bernstein; The Best of The Oprah Show: Finding Something More
97	9	November 2, 2014	Marianne Williamson	Marianne Williamson	Help Desk Hermosa Beach with Rob Bell
98	10	November 9, 2014	Barbara Brown Taylor	Barbara Brown Taylor	Help Desk San Francisco with Panache Desai
99	11	November 16, 2014	Paul Williams & Tracey Jackson	Paul Williams & Tracey Jackson	Help Desk Washington with Iyanla Vanzant, Part II
100	12	November 23, 2014	Timothy Shriver	Timothy Shriver	Help Desk Washington with Iyanla Vanzant; The Best of The Oprah Show: What Your Marriage is Trying to Teach You
101	13	December 21, 2014	Soul to Soul 3 Primetime Special	Pharrell Williams, John Legend, Tina Turner, Sharon Stone, David Oyelowo	The Rob Bell Show

=== Season 10 (2015) ===
No. in series	No. in season	Original air date	Title	Guest	Additional Segments
102	1	February 8, 2015	Oprah & Author Richard Rohr: The Search For Our True Self	Richard Rohr	In Deep Shift with Jonas Elrod: Mary Neal. To Heaven and Back
103	2	February 15, 2015	Oprah with Rob and Kristen Bell: How to Transform Your Relationships	Rob & Kristen Bell	In Deep Shift with Jonas Elrod: Jen Larsen. Body Image from the Inside Out
104	3	February 22, 2015	Oprah & Paralympian Amy Purdy: How to Create a New Vision for Your Life	Amy Purdy	In Deep Shift with Jonas Elrod: Amanda Lindgren. Love Never Dies
105	4	March 1, 2015	Oprah and Sister Joan Chittister: A Life of Passion, Purpose, and Joy	Joan Chittister	In Deep Shift with Jonas Elrod: Vince Young. Fathers and Sons
106	5	March 8, 2015	Oprah & Bestselling Author Pico Iyer: The Art of Stillness	Pico Iyer	In Deep Shift with Jonas Elrod: Ester Nicholson. Mothers and Daughters
107	6	March 15, 2015	Former NBA Star Jay Williams on Finding His Purpose After Losing It All	Jay Williams	In Deep Shift with Jonas Elrod: Karen Perry. Angels Three
108	7	March 22, 2015	Oprah & Best-selling Author Cynthia Bond's Ruby: Oprah's Book Club 2.0	Cynthia Bond	In Deep Shift with Jonas Elrod: Maysoon Zayid. Taking a Stand
109	8	March 29, 2015	Oprah and Bestselling Author Michael Pollan: Mindful Eating	Michael Pollan	In Deep Shift with Jonas Elrod: Alanis Morissette. God Girl
110	9	April 5, 2015	Oprah and Life Coach Tim Storey: Finding Your Calling	Tim Storey	Super Soul Sunday marathon
111	10	April 12, 2015	Oprah and Jon Kabat-Zinn: Practicing Mindfulness	Jon Kabat-Zinn	Super Soul Sunday marathon
112	11	April 19, 2015	Oprah and Oscar-Winning Producer Brian Grazer on the Power of Curiosity	Brian Grazer	Super Soul Sunday marathon
113	12	April 26, 2015	Ageless Living with Oprah and Dr. Christiane Northrup	Dr. Christiane Northrup	Super Soul Sunday marathon
114	13	May 3, 2015	Oprah and Bestselling Author Janet Mock: Becoming Your Most Authentic Self	Janet Mock	Super Soul Sunday marathon

=== Season 11 (2015) ===
No. in series	No. in season	Original air date	Title	Guest	Additional Segments	Viewers (millions)
115	1	September 27, 2015	Oprah's Intimate Interview with President Jimmy Carter	Jimmy Carter	N/A	0.28
116	2	October 4, 2015	Rising Strong with Brené Brown	Brené Brown	"The Rooster Who Nearly Died and Rose Again Stronger Than Ever" by John Chester at Apricot Lane Farms	0.15
117	3	October 11, 2015	Oprah and Nobel Peace Prize Winner Malala Yousafzai	Malala Yousafzai	Belief	0.18
118	4	October 18, 2015	A Religion of One's Own With Thomas Moore	Thomas Moore	Belief	0.31
119	5	October 25, 2015	Oprah and Feminist Icon Gloria Steinem	Gloria Steinem	"A Photographer's Journey: Discovering True Beauty in Women" by Mihaela Noroc	0.18
120	6	November 1, 2015	Just Mercy with Civil Rights Attorney Bryan Stevenson	Bryan Stevenson	"Showing Empathy for the Animals Who Scare Us Most" by Joe Romero	0.25
121	7	November 8, 2015	Oprah and Happiness Expert Gretchen Rubin	Gretchen Rubin	"The Joy of Knowing What Really Makes You Happy" by Jason Perez	0.21
122	8	November 15, 2015	Oprah and Prolific TV Producer Shonda Rhimes	Shonda Rhimes	SuperSoul Original Short: "Start Your Week with a Resounding Yes"	0.17
123	9	November 22, 2015	Oprah and Pastor Wintley Phipps	Wintley Phipps	"Gratitude" by Louie Schwartzberg	N/A
124	10	November 29, 2015	Oprah and Women's Rights Activist Zainab Salbi	Zainab Salbi	SuperSoul Original Short: "If You Knew Me You Would Care"	N/A
125	11	December 6, 2015	Oprah Interviews New York Times Columnist David Brooks	David Brooks	"Denali: A Tribute to Man's Best Friend" by Ben Moon	N/A
126	12	December 13, 2015	Oprah and Jack Canfield	Jack Canfield	Super Soul Sessions with Oprah Winfrey, Brene Brown, Elizabeth Gilbert & Tim Storey	N/A

=== Season 12 (2016) ===
No. in series	No. in season	Original air date	Title	Guest	Additional Segments
127	1	March 13, 2016	Oprah and Criminal Justice Activist Shaka Senghor	Shaka Senghor	"I Am Not a Label" by Prince Ea
128	2	March 20, 2016	Oprah and New York Times Bestselling Author Daniel Goleman	Daniel Goleman	"The Journey of Apricot Lane Farms" by John Chester
129	3	March 27, 2016	Oprah and Pastor Joel Osteen	Joel Osteen	"#dearstuartscott: A Love Letter from Stuart Scott's Daughters" by Dear World
130	4	April 3, 2016	Oprah and Comedian and TV Star Tracy Morgan	Tracy Morgan	N/A
131	5	April 10, 2016	Oprah and Bestselling Author Cheryl Strayed	Cheryl Strayed	"The Important Places" by Gnarly Bay & Forest Woodward
132	6	April 17, 2016	Oprah Sits Down with Religious Scholar Reza Aslan	Reza Aslan	"Five" by Katina Mercadante
133	7	April 24, 2016	Oprah Sits Down with Spiritual Life Coach Iyanla Vanzant	Iyanla Vanzant	Breathing Space: "A Baby Bird Takes Flight"
134	8	May 1, 2016	Oprah Sits Down with TV Icon Norman Lear	Norman Lear	Breathing Space: "Archie Bunker Answers Life's Big Questions"

=== Season 13 (2016) ===
No. in series	No. in season	Original air date	Title	Guest	Additional Segments
135	1	August 7, 2016	Oprah Sits Down with New York Times Bestselling Author Dr. Shefali Tsabary	Dr. Shefali Tsabary	SuperSoul Original Short: "Oprah's Surprise Visit to Mattie Stepanek's Mother, Jeni"
136	2	August 14, 2016	Oprah Sits Down with Tony Robbins and His Wife Sage	Tony Robbins and Sage Robbins	SuperSoul Original Short: "The Conditioned"
137	3	August 21, 2016	Oprah and The Humane Society of The United States President/CEO Wayne Pacelle	Wayne Pacelle	"What Maggie the Cow Taught a Farmer About Letting Go" by John Chester at Apricot Lanes
138	4	August 28, 2016	Oprah Sits Down with Hollywood Power Couple DeVon Franklin, and Meagan Good	DeVon Franklin and Meagan Good	SuperSoul Original Short: "Chloe"
139	5	September 4, 2016	Oprah and Social Entrepreneur Wes Moore	Wes Moore	"The Inspiring Story Behind the Baltimore Photo That Landed on the Cover of Time" by Yahoo
140	6	September 11, 2016	Oprah's Book Club 2.0: Oprah Sits Down with Bestselling Author Glennon Doyle Melton	Glennon Doyle Melton	"Come Eat" by Long Winter Media
141	7	September 18, 2016	Oprah Sits Down with LinkedIn CEO Jeff Weiner	Jeff Weiner	"Miyako" by Erez Sitzer; SuperSoul Original Short: "A Target Employee's Act of Kindness Yields a Surprising Reward"; "A Tribute to Discomfort" by Blue Chalk Media
142	8	September 25, 2016	Oprah Sits Down with Author and Philanthropist Cookie Johnson	Cookie Johnson	"The Rebound" By Samaritan's Purse
143	9	October 2, 2016	Oprah Sits Down with Author and Co-founder of the Omega Institute Elizabeth Lesser	Elizabeth Lesser	"Gratitude Grows" by Hailey & Andrew Bartholomew
144	10	October 9, 2016	Oprah and Founder of the Agape International Spiritual Centre Michael Beckwith	Michael Beckwith	"The DNA Journey" by Momondo
145	11	October 16, 2016	Oprah and New York City's Hillsong Church Senior Pastor Carl Lentz	Carl Lentz	"Delivery Room" by Michael Jr.
146	12	October 23, 2016	Oprah and Grammy and Academy Award-winning Singer/Songwriter Carole Bayer Sager	Carole Bayer Sager	"Elegy for the Arctic" by Greenpeace

=== Season 14 (2017) ===
No. in series	No. in season	Original air date	Title	Guest	Additional Segments
147	1	April 16, 2017	Oprah Sits Down with Pastor John Gray	John Gray	"Everybody Dies, but Not Everybody Lives" by Prince Ea
148	2	April 23, 2017	Oprah and Global Visionary Lynne Twist	Lynne Twist	SuperSoul Original Short: "We Are Fire"
149	3	April 30, 2017	Oprah Talks to New York Times Bestselling Author Geneen Roth	Geneen Roth	"What Do Strangers Think Of You?" by BuzzFeed
150	4	May 7, 2017	Oprah and Palliative Care Physician BJ Miller	BJ Miller	SuperSoul Original Short: "When Breath Becomes Air"
151	5	June 25, 2017	Oprah and Facebook's Sheryl Sandberg	Sheryl Sandberg	N/A
152	6	July 2, 2017	Soul to Soul Version 4 – Answering Life's Big Questions	Tony Robbins, Janet Mock, Shonda Rhimes, Iyanla Vanzant, Malala Yousafzai, Brené Brown	SuperSoul Original Short: "Mother Earth"
153	7	July 9, 2017	Oprah and The Shack Author, William Paul Young on the Lies He Says We Believe	William Paul Young	N/A
154	8	July 16, 2017	Oprah and Writer and Futurist Charles Eisenstein	Charles Eisenstein	"The Orphan" by John Chester at Apricot Lanes
155	9	August 20, 2017	Oprah Talks to Bestselling Author Shauna Niequist	Shauna Niequist	N/A
156	10	August 27, 2017	Oprah Sits Down with New York Times Bestselling Author Mitch Albom	Mitch Albom	N/A
157	11	September 10, 2017	Oprah and Pastor A. R. Bernard	A. R. Bernard	N/A
158	12	October 22, 2017	Oprah and Visionary Thought Leader Eckhart Tolle	Eckhart Tolle	SuperSoul Original Short: "Kidada Jones' School of Awake"
159	13	October 29, 2017	Oprah and Brother David Steindl-Rast	Brother David Steindl-Rast	SuperSoul Original Short: "Covenant House Makeover"
160	14	November 5, 2017	Oprah Takes You Inside "The Wisdom of Sundays"	Eckhart Tolle, Gary Zukav, Iyanla Vanzant, Brené Brown, Elizabeth Lesser, Shaka Senghor	N/A
161	15	November 12, 2017	Oprah Sits Down with Former Vice President Joe Biden	Joe Biden	Breathing Space: "The Smithsonian National Museum of African American History and Culture"

=== Season 15 (2018–19) ===
No. in series	No. in season	Original air date	Title	Guest	Additional Segments
162	1	June 10, 2018	Oprah's Book Club: Freedom After 30 Years on Death Row	Anthony Ray Hinton	N/A
163	2	June 17, 2018	Quarterback Tom Brady on Legacy & Longevity	Tom Brady	"Light" by Prince Ea
164	3	December 8, 2018	Oprah at Home with Gabrielle Union, Dwyane Wade & Their New Baby	Gabrielle Union, Dwyane Wade	N/A
165	4	February 16, 2019	Oprah's SuperSoul Conversations from Times Square: Michael B. Jordan, Bradley Cooper, Beto O'Rourke, Melinda Gates, and Lisa Borders	Michael B. Jordan, Bradley Cooper, Beto O'Rourke, Melinda Gates, and Lisa Borders	N/A
166	5	February 24, 2019	Beto O'Rourke: A Hopeful Voice	Beto O'Rourke	N/A
167	6	March 3, 2019	Bradley Cooper: A Soulful Star Is Born	Bradley Cooper	SuperSoul Original Short: Chasing the Sublime
168	7	March 10, 2019	Michael B. Jordan: Exceeding His Dreams	Michael B. Jordan	N/A
169	8	March 31, 2019	The Path Made Clear	Eckhart Tolle, Gary Zukav, Iyanla Vanzant, Brené Brown, Elizabeth Gilbert, Jay-Z, Caroline Myss, Dr. Shefali Tsabary, and others	N/A
170	9	April 28, 2019	Melinda Gates: The Moment of Lift	Melinda Gates	N/A
171	10	May 5, 2019	Oprah Sits Down with Tara Westover	Tara Westover	N/A

=== Season 16 (2019) ===
No. in series	No. in season	Original air date	Title	Guest	Additional Segments
172	1	May 19, 2019	David Brooks: The Quest for a Moral Life	David Brooks	N/A
173	2	May 26, 2019	Sister Joan Chittister: The Time is Now	Sister Joan Chittister	N/A
174	3	June 2, 2019	Father Richard Rohr: The Universal Christ	Father Richard Rohr	The Universal Christ Book Trailer
175	4	June 9, 2019	Elizabeth Gilbert: City of Girls	Elizabeth Gilbert	N/A
176	5	June 16, 2019	Dr. Edith Eva Eger: The Choice	Dr. Edith Eva Eger	N/A
177	6	September 15, 2019	Malcolm Gladwell: Talking to Strangers	Malcolm Gladwell	N/A
178	7	September 22, 2019	Dean and Anne Ornish	Dean Ornish, Anne Ornish	N/A
179	8	September 29, 2019	Chanel Miller: Know My Name	Chanel Miller	N/A
180	9	September 29, 2019	Bob Iger: The Ride of a Lifetime	Bob Iger	N/A
181	10	October 6, 2019	Joy Harjo-Sapulpa: An American Sunrise	Joy Harjo-Sapulpa	N/A
182	11	October 13, 2019	Suzy Amis Cameron: One Meal a Day	Suzy Amis Cameron	The Sustainability-Focused MUSE School
183	12	October 20, 2019	Pema Chödrön: Welcoming the Unwelcome	Pema Chödrön	N/A
184	13	October 26, 2019	OWN Spotlight: Oprah At Home with Lupita Nyong'o and Cynthia Erivo	Lupita Nyong'o and Cynthia Erivo	N/A

=== Season 17 (2020–21) ===
No. in series	No. in season	Original air date	Title	Guest	Additional Segments
185	1	March 29, 2020	Oprah and Alicia Keys: The Interview	Alicia Keys	Alicia performs three songs, including the new single "Underdog"—from her upcoming album, Alicia
186	2	November 1, 2020	Oprah and Reverend Otis Moss III: Honoring the Right to Vote	Otis Moss III	Otis' Dream: A Short Film
187	3	March 7, 2021	OWN Spotlight: Oprah and Andra Day	Andra Day	
188	4	November 14, 2021	Chip and Joanna Gaines	Chip and Joanna Gaines	
189	5	November 21, 2021	Sharon Stone	Sharon Stone	
190	6	November 28, 2021	Dr. Bruce Perry	Dr. Bruce Perry	
191	7	December 5, 2021	Julianna Margulies	Julianna Margulies	
192	8	December 12, 2021	Jon Meacham	Jon Meacham	
193	9	December 19, 2021	Priyanka Chopra Jonas	Priyanka Chopra Jonas	

== Awards and nominations ==
Year	Award	Category	Result
2012	39th Daytime Emmy Awards	Outstanding Special Class Series	Won
2013	Gracie Awards	Outstanding Special or Variety	Won
2013	40th Daytime Emmy Awards	Outstanding Special Class Series	Nominated
2013	Wilbur Award	from the Religion Communicators Council	Won
2014	41st Daytime Emmy Awards	Outstanding Special Class Series	Won
2014	41st Daytime Emmy Awards	Multiple Camera Editing	Nominated
2014	21st Annual NAMIC Vision Awards	News/Informational Show	Nominated
2015	22nd Annual NAMIC Vision Awards	Variety/ Talk Show ("Oprah & Russell Simmons: Success Through Stillness")	Nominated
2016	27th GLAAD Media Awards	Outstanding Talk Show Episode ("Oprah and Bestselling Author Janet Mock: Becoming Your Most Authentic Self")	Won
2016	23rd Annual NAMIC Vision Awards	Daytime Show	Won
2016	Gracie Awards	Outstanding Talk Show – Entertainment, Lifestyle, Health	Won
2016	43rd Daytime Emmy Awards	Outstanding Special Class Short Format Daytime Program (Super Soul Shorts)	Won
2016	43rd Daytime Emmy Awards	Outstanding Special Class Series	Nominated
2017	48th NAACP Image Awards	Outstanding Talk Series	Nominated
2017	24th Annual NAMIC Vision Awards	Daytime Show	Nominated
2017	44th Daytime Emmy Awards	Outstanding Special Class Series	Won
2017	28th GLAAD Media Awards	Outstanding Talk Show Episode ("Cookie Johnson")	Nominated
2018	49th NAACP Image Awards	Outstanding Talk Series	Nominated
2018	45th Daytime Emmy Awards	Outstanding Special Class Series	Nominated
2019	46th Daytime Emmy Awards	Outstanding Special Class Special (Oprah's Book Club: Freedom After 30 Years on Death Row)	Nominated
