= Omega Institute for Holistic Studies =

Non-profit educational retreat center located in Rhinebeck, NY, US, founded in 1977

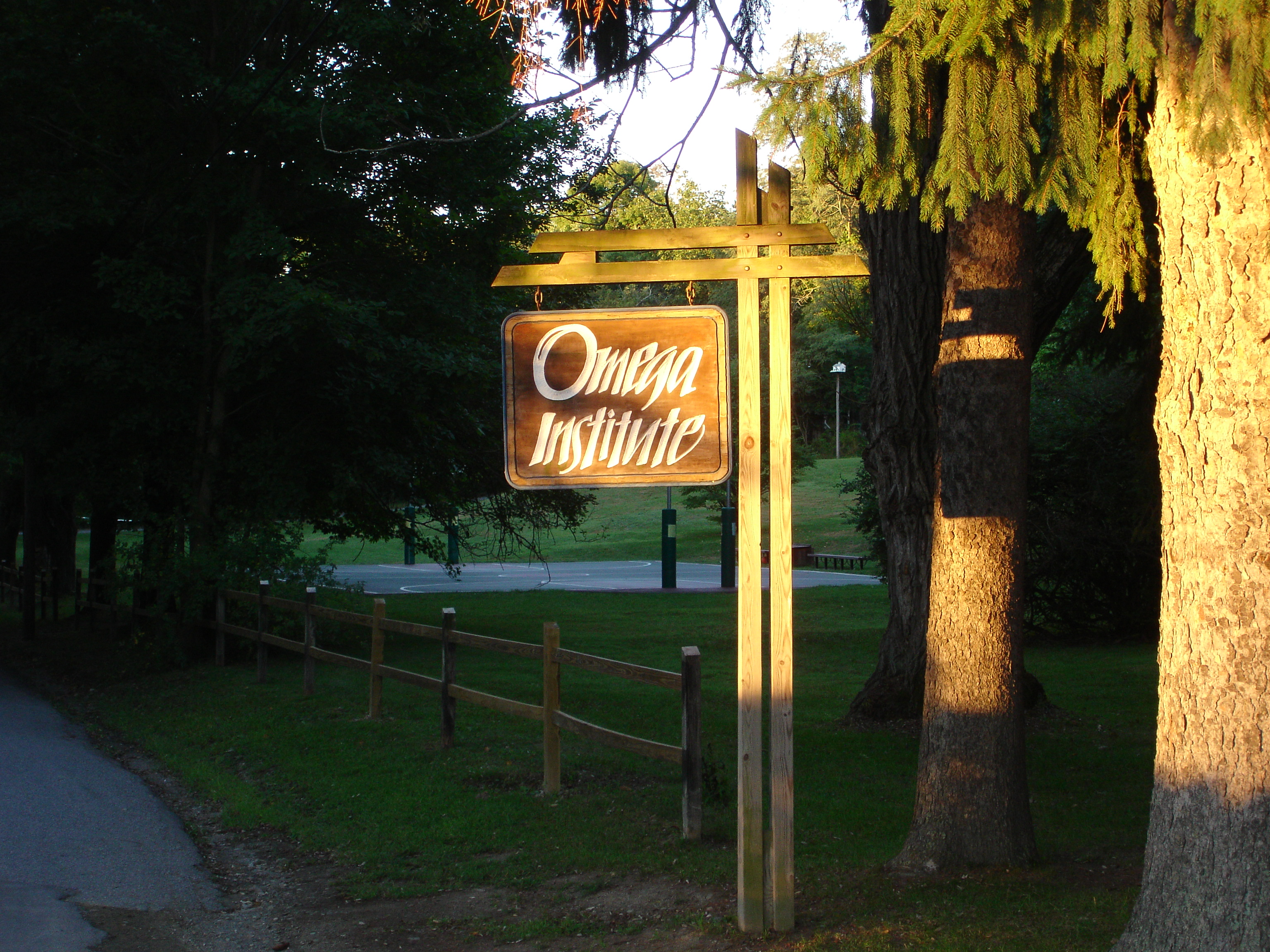
- Omega Institute, Lake Drive, Rhinebeck, NY
- Formation: 1977
- Headquarters: Rhinebeck, New York
- Location: United States
- Coordinates: 41.8856°N 73.8205°W
- Website: www.eomega.org

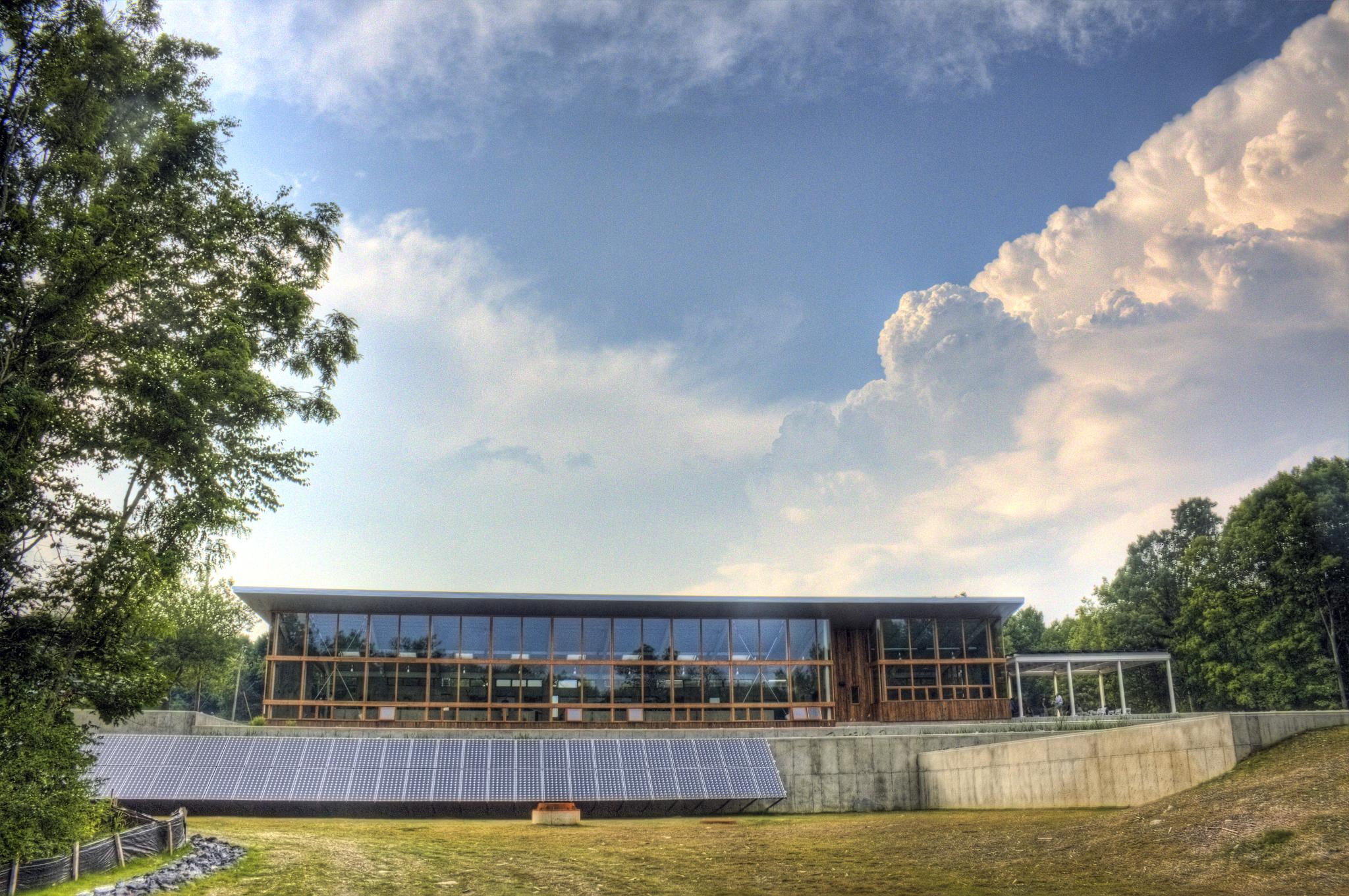
Omega Center for Sustainable Living (OCSL) at Rhinebeck, New York.

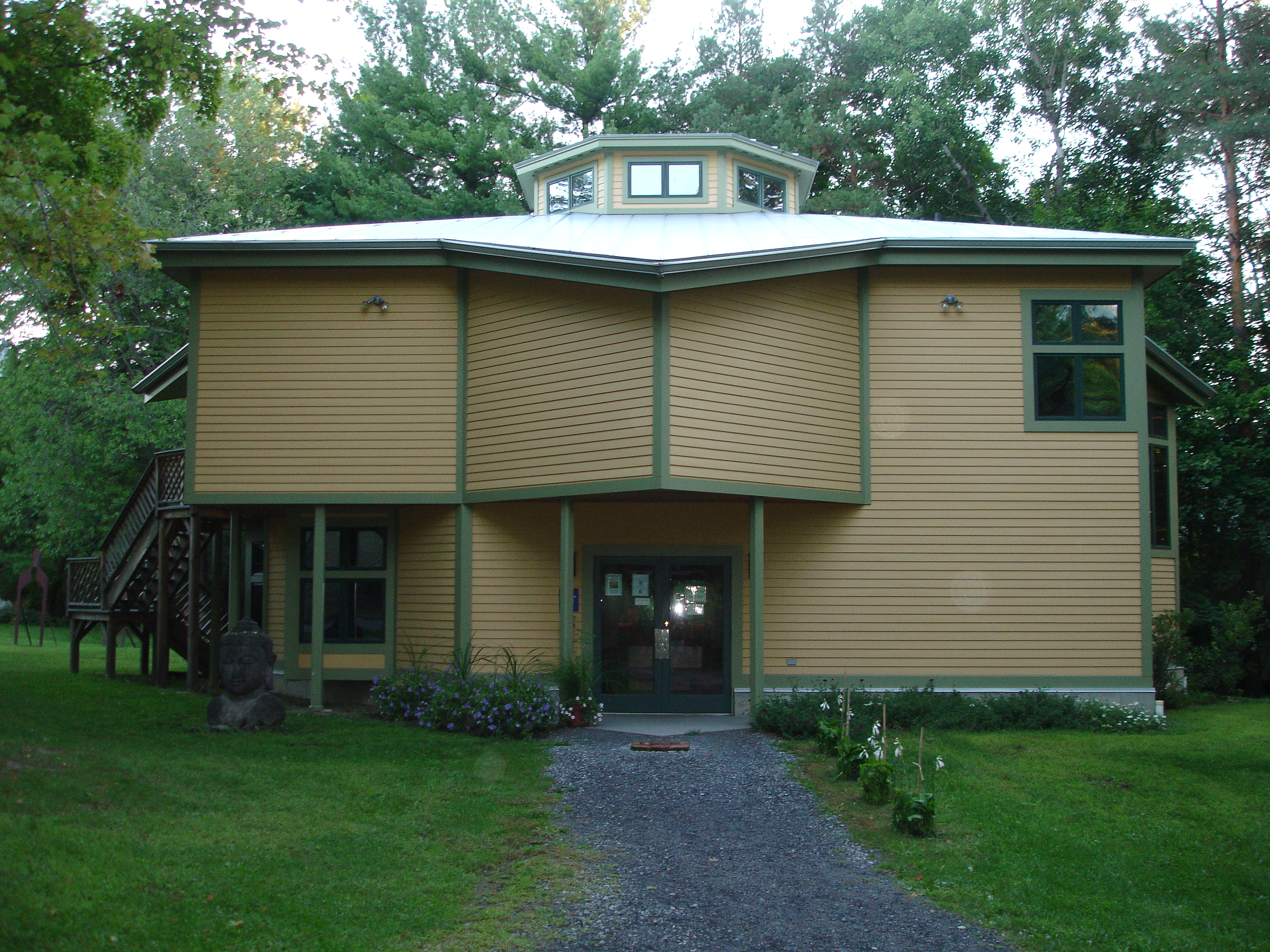
Ram Dass Library, at Omega Institute, Rhinebeck, New York.

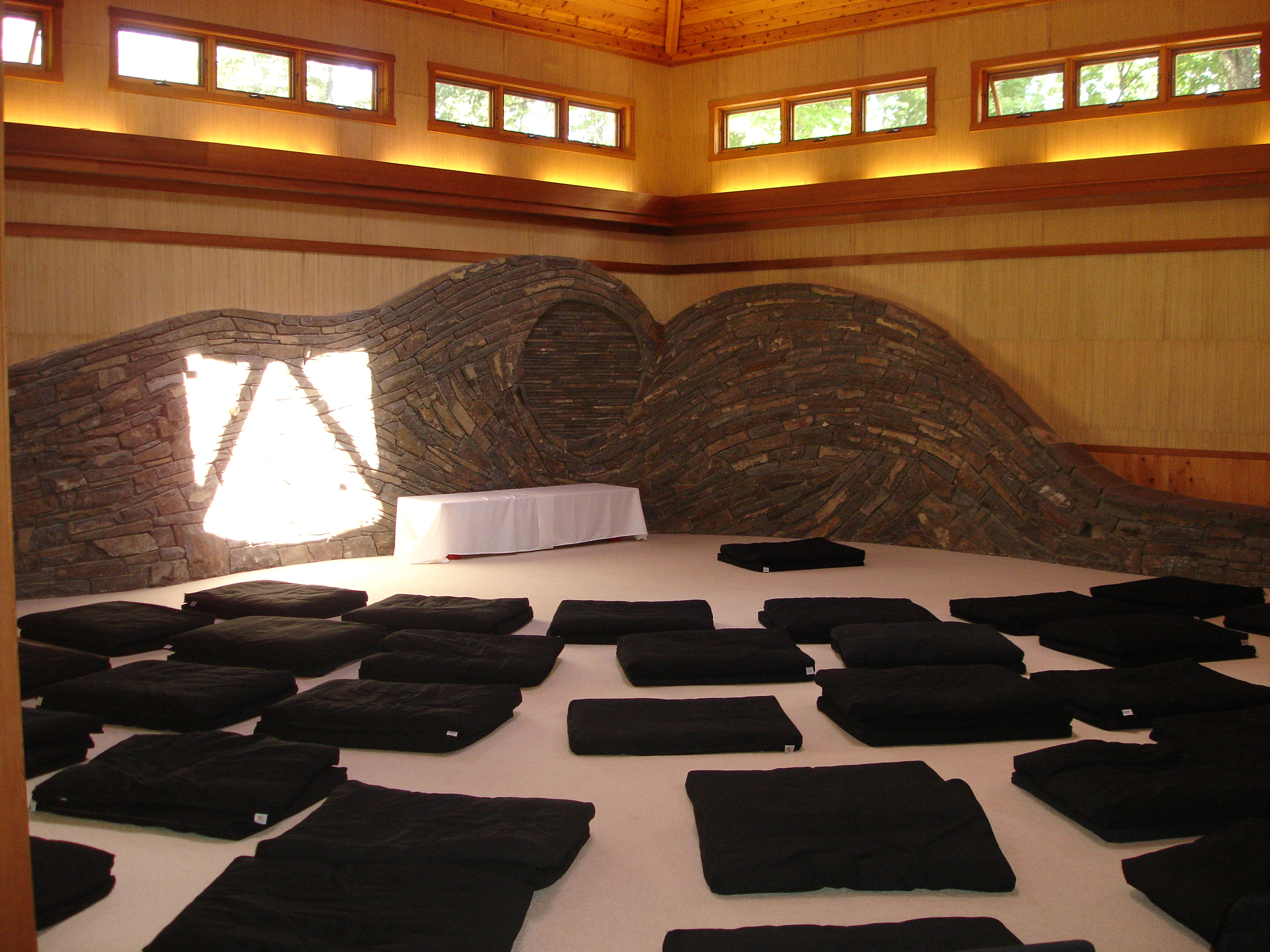
Sanctuary (meditation hall) at Omega Institute, Rhinebeck, New York.

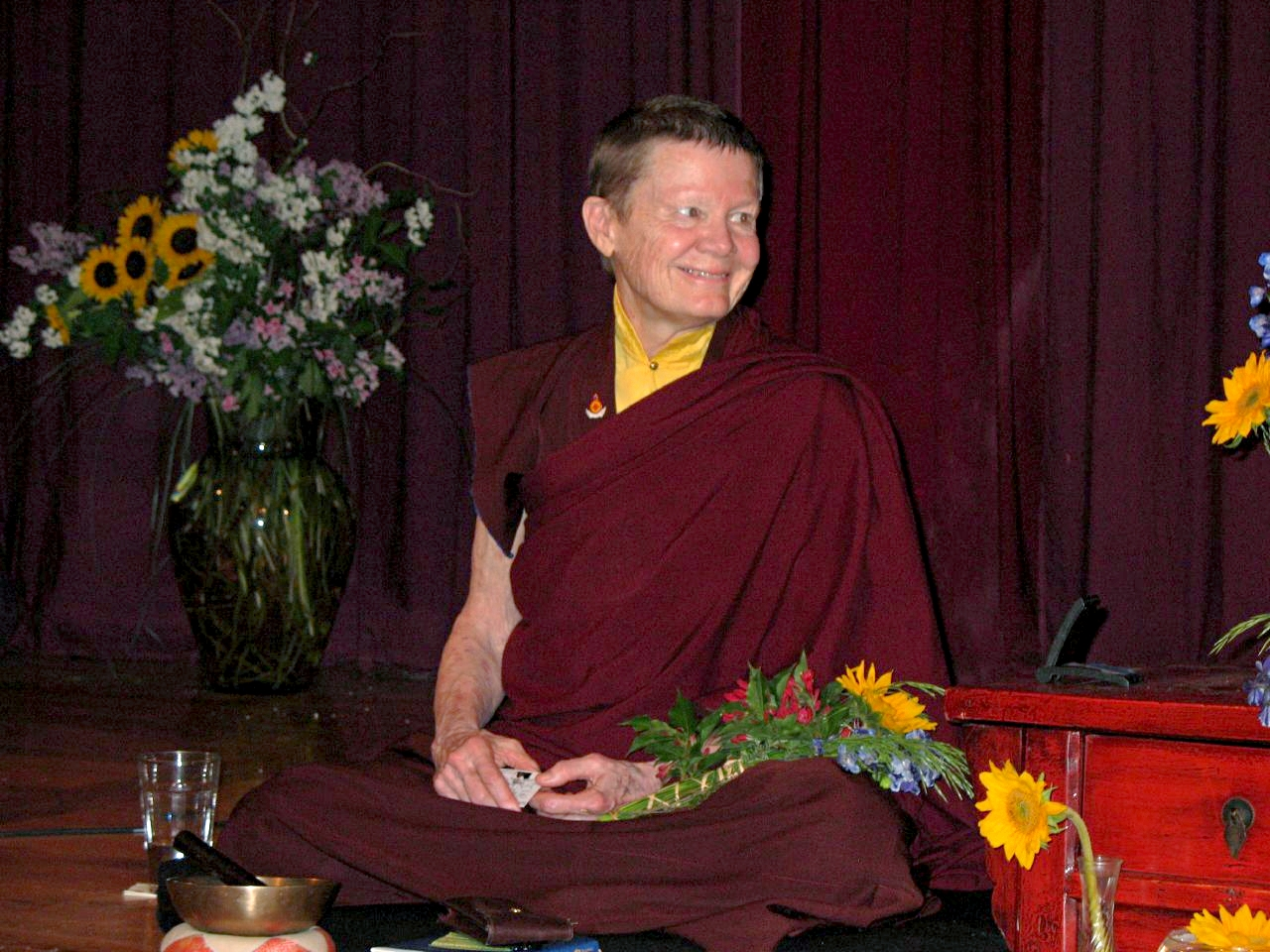
Pema Chodron at the Omega Institute, May 2007.

Omega Institute for Holistic Studies is a non-profit educational retreat center located in Rhinebeck, New York. Founded in 1977 by Elizabeth Lesser and Stephan Rechtschaffen, inspired by Sufi mystic, Pir Vilayat Inayat Khan and his ecumenical spirituality, today it offers classes to over 25,000 people a year, at the 190-acre (0.77 km^{2}) campus.

The institute's stated mission is to "provide hope and healing for individuals and society through innovative educational experiences that awaken the best in the human spirit". Omega’s workshops, conferences, and retreats aim to create dialogues on the integration of modern medicine and natural healing; connect science, spirituality, and creativity; and build the groundwork for new traditions and lifestyles.

== History ==
In 1977, co-founders Stephan Rechtschaffen, author of Timeshifting, and Elizabeth Lesser, author of The Seeker’s Guide and New York Times best-selling Broken Open, were inspired to create the Omega Institute by scholar and Eastern meditation teacher, Pir Vilayat Inayat Khan. The name “Omega” came from the teachings of Pierre Teilhard de Chardin, a 20th-century French philosopher and Jesuit priest who used the term “Omega Point” to describe the peak of unity and integration toward which all life is evolving. First established while Lesser and Rechtschaffen were staying at New Lebanon Shaker Village / The Abode of the Message, the center found a new home in 1980, moving to land that once housed the Sholem Aleichem Folk Institute's Camp Boiberick, in the Hudson River Valley.

Omega Institute began its programming with several workshops and now holds more than 300 workshops in Rhinebeck, New York City, Costa Rica, and California.

== Rhinebeck campus ==
In 1982, Omega expanded from rented facilities in New York and Vermont to its current location on the former grounds of Camp Boiberik, a Yiddish camp, in Rhinebeck, New York. There are more than 100 buildings on the 250-acre (1.0 km^{2}) campus, including a dining hall, café, and bookstore. Its buildings also include the Ram Dass Library, named for author Ram Dass who "has been a trusted guide to Omega". In honor of Dass' life’s work, the organization commissioned the library, which is designed in an eight-petal lotus blossom shape to represent Ram Dass’ service to public health, advancing social justice, and supporting spiritual development throughout the world.

The campus also includes the Omega Center for Sustainable Living (OCSL), which is an education center powered by a 48.5 kW solar electric system and has a water reclamation facility.

The OCSL was one of the first two buildings in the world to be certified as "living" by the International Living Building Institute. The Omega Center for Sustainable Living is a wastewater filtration facility that is designed to use treated water for garden irrigation and in a greywater recovery system. Omega will use the system and the building as a teaching tool in their educational program designed around the ecological impact of their campus.

== Programs and faculty ==
Omega’s educational programs include workshops, professional training, retreats, and conferences. Workshops are organized into six categories: body, mind, and spirit; health and healing; creative expression; relationships and family; leadership and work; and sustainable living.

New York City events have included speakers such as Al Gore, Christopher Reeve, and Eckhart Tolle. Annually, Omega hosts a yoga service conference, and the Omega Women’s Leadership Center offers a conference that includes speakers such as Eve Ensler, Isabel Allende, and Sally Field. Omega offers scholarships to a variety of workshops, training, conferences, and retreats.

Other Omega speakers and teachers have included Adyashanti, Maya Angelou, Deepak Chopra, Pema Chödrön, Jeanne Fleming, Jane Goodall, Pir Vilayat Inayat Khan, Ram Dass, Thich Nhat Hanh, Allen Ginsberg, Gloria Steinem, Pete Seeger, Robert F. Kennedy, Jr., Philip Glass, Betty Williams, Lon Milo DuQuette, and many others.

== Staff ==
Omega has a core staff of 85 and a seasonal staff of more than 250. The core staff plan and develop the curriculum, marketing, and production for the season’s programs, and its seasonal staff manage and staff campus departments. Inspired by Ram Dass, Omega created a curriculum for Omega’s staff that includes classes designed to encourage self-development, mindfulness, and community service.

== See also ==
- Esalen Institute
- Kalani Oceanside Retreat
- Kripalu Center
