= Wilbur Award =

Wilbur Award may refer to:

- The Richard Wilbur Award - a poetry award sponsored by the University of Evansville
- The Wilbur Awards - a religious communication award sponsored by the Religion Communicators Council
