= All Saints Episcopal Church (Pasadena, California) =

Church in Pasadena, California

All Saints Episcopal Church, Pasadena
- Iglesia de Todos Los Santos en Pasadena
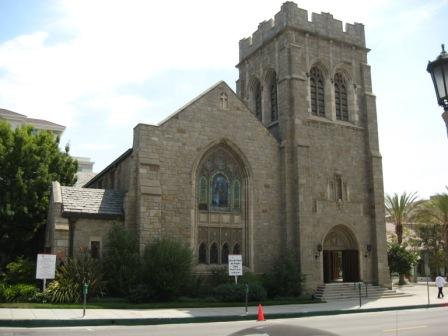
- All Saints Episcopal Church in 2009
- All Saints Episcopal Church, Pasadena
- 34°08′53″N 118°08′34″W
- Location: Pasadena, California
- Country: United States
- Denomination: Episcopal
- Tradition: Broad Church
- Churchmanship: Progressive
- Website: All Saints Church

History
- Status: Church
- Founded: November 1882; 144 years ago
- Founder(s): Mr. and Mrs. CC Brown, Rev. Trew
- Dedicated: April 18, 1885 (original)

Architecture
- Functional status: Active
- Architect(s): Roland Coate, Reginald Davis Johnson, Gordon Kaufmann
- Style: Gothic Revival
- Completed: December 1924

Administration
- Province: Province VIII
- Diocese: Episcopal Diocese of Los Angeles

Clergy
- Bishop: John H. Taylor

All Saints Church is an Episcopal church located in Pasadena, California. Part of the Episcopal Diocese of Los Angeles, the current building is the third home for ministry of the church.

The church has a reputation of being one of Southern California's most liberal churches and one of the largest Episcopal churches in the country. Reported average attendance is 429 (2023). Former Rector Ed Bacon said that political activism "is in the DNA of the church."

In 1980, All Saints was listed by the National Park Service on the National Register of Historic Places as a Contributing Structure to the Pasadena Civic Center District.

== History of the parish ==
In November 1882, eleven people gathered in the home of Mr. and Mrs. C.C. Brown for services conducted by the Reverend Trew. In 1885 the congregation dedicated its first church building at the corner of Colorado Blvd. and Garfield Ave. on April 5 (Easter Day). The parish continued to grow rapidly, and a new site was purchased at 132 North Euclid for the building of a 600-seat church. First services were held on Easter Day, April 21, 1889. The congregation outgrew the church building, and a new church building was built in 1923. It was designed by architects Roland Coate (1890–1958), Reginald Davis Johnson (1882–1952) and Gordon Kaufmann (1888–1949), and it is listed on the National Register of Historic Places. It opened in 1924.

All Saints bought additional property in 1926–7, where it built a parish hall and rectory. The architects for these buildings were Cyril Bennett and Fitch Harrison Haskell, designers of the Civic Auditorium. They were also designed in the English Gothic style, and form an integrated courtyard with the main church. The Parish Hall suffered extensive damage during two fires in 1976.

A series of long rectorships began with the arrival of the Reverend Leslie E. Learned in 1908:

- The Reverend Leslie E. Learned (1908–1936)
- The Reverend John Frank Scott (1936–1957)
- The Reverend John Harris Burt (1957–1967)
- The Reverend Dr. George Frank Regas (1967–1995)
- The Reverend Dr. J. Edwin (Ed) Bacon (1995–2016)
- The Reverend Michael Kinman (2016–2024)

All Saints leaders and parishioners agreed that the church needed to add to its building space to house the increased scope of its activities. Having grown to 3,500 members in the congregation, 125 ministries and 13,000 meetings per year, the facilities built in the 1920s were inadequate for the 21st Century. In 1999, the church hired architect Michael Palladino to design a suitable space. He developed a four-building complex employing a contemporary design, but using many of the same architectural materials as the existing complex. The proposal was presented to the Pasadena planning commission in 2007, and was estimated to cost $46.0 million. In 2008, the commission ruled that the proposed project could not proceed until a new full environmental impact report (EIR) could be produced and approved. (Note: Some other requirements imposed by the commission in 2008 included: 1. Building a 220-unit senior living center complex at the corner of Walnut Street and Euclid Avenue; 2. Moving the entrance to the underground parking garage from Euclid Avenue to Walnut Street; and; 3. Adding more landscaped areas to the church campus.) The draft report was issued in July, 2010.

Public criticism of the proposal continue all the while, and it took five years to get the necessary approvals from the city. Meanwhile, estimated construction costs escalated dramatically because of extensive revisions to make the project even more grand. According to the chairman of the building committee, the 2015 cost to complete the project would be over $70.0 million. During this time several large donors had either died or moved away from Pasadena. Furthermore, Ed Bacon was scheduled to retire from the church in May 2016. Therefore, Bacon announced that he was putting execution of the project on hold until his replacement could restart it.

== History of social activism ==
Although a casual look at the chronology listed below might suggest that All Saints began to be serious about social activism only in the mid-1960s, Rector George Regas clarified this point in a 1990 interview. Regas stated that his predecessor, John Burt was a very strong advocate for social activism. Regas claimed that no (mainline) churches were even talking about such issues as racial justice in the early 1960s. Regas compared Burt to a biblical prophet calling the faithful to be aware of their own shortcomings and urging them to get busy in their own house and communities to remedy these social ills.

- 1942 – Rector Frank Scott stands "in front of trains to protest the removal of Japanese Americans to internment camps during World War II"
- 1964 – Rector John Burt joins with Martin Luther King, Jr., to speak for racial justice in Los Angeles
- 1983 – All Saints declares itself to be a "sanctuary church," offering services to refugees fleeing conflicts in Central America
- 1987 – All Saints' AIDS Service Center created
- 1992 – First same-sex union blessing, of Mark Benson and Philip Straw, performed on January 18
- 2006 – All Saints fights IRS threat to remove All Saints Church's tax exempt status over the 2004 Regas sermon
- 2007 – IRS drops anti-war sermon investigation
- 2008 – Mel White and Gary Nixon become first same-sex couple married at All Saints Church in response to a ruling by the Supreme Court of California
- 2009 – Appearing on The Oprah Winfrey Show, Bacon's January 7 statement that "being gay is a gift from God" creates controversy and led to a national discussion on his remarks
- 2009 – Bacon joins with interfaith witnesses at the White House as part of the National Religious Campaign Against Torture

== IRS investigation ==
In September 2006, the IRS issued a summons against All Saints demanding that the church turn over documents related to the controversial sermon. All Saints Church's response was that the IRS was violating the church's First Amendment rights and that the Church would challenge the IRS's actions in a summons enforcement proceeding in the United States Federal District Court. The church then established a charitable fund to raise money for its legal defense.

The Pasadena Star News reported that All Saints would remain defiant against the IRS. Rector Ed Bacon asserted that political activism was "in the DNA" of the church.

Result of IRS investigation

On September 25, 2007, CCH reported in Federal Tax Day:

On September 10, 2007, the IRS notified the congregation that it was closing its investigation. The IRS determined that the sermon was political campaign intervention. It offered no explanation as to why the sermon violated the ban on political intervention. The IRS also did not indicate if it intended to impose excise taxes under Code Sec. 4955 [see 26 U.S.C. § 4955] on the church or its officers. However, it did not revoke the church's exempt status.

According to the Pasadena Star News, the IRS told church officials that the sermon constituted an endorsement of a candidate. Rector Ed Bacon demanded that the IRS apologize and that the IRS be investigated.

The Church's legal counsel has asked the IRS for a clarification of the decision, and for assurance that the IRS did not act under pressure from the White House. The Church has also requested that the U.S. Treasury Inspector General for Tax Administration (TIGTA) examine the IRS's investigation.

== Sabeel controversy ==
In 2008, relations with the local Jewish community were strained when the Church hosted the pro-Palestinian Sabeel conference. Rabbi emeritus of the Pasadena Jewish Temple and Center, Rabbi Gil Kollin, said: "As a neighbor, I was disappointed. A conference of this kind is going to make me feel uncomfortable and get a lot of our congregants upset." The local Jewish temple had previously supported the church in its IRS dispute.

== Gallery ==
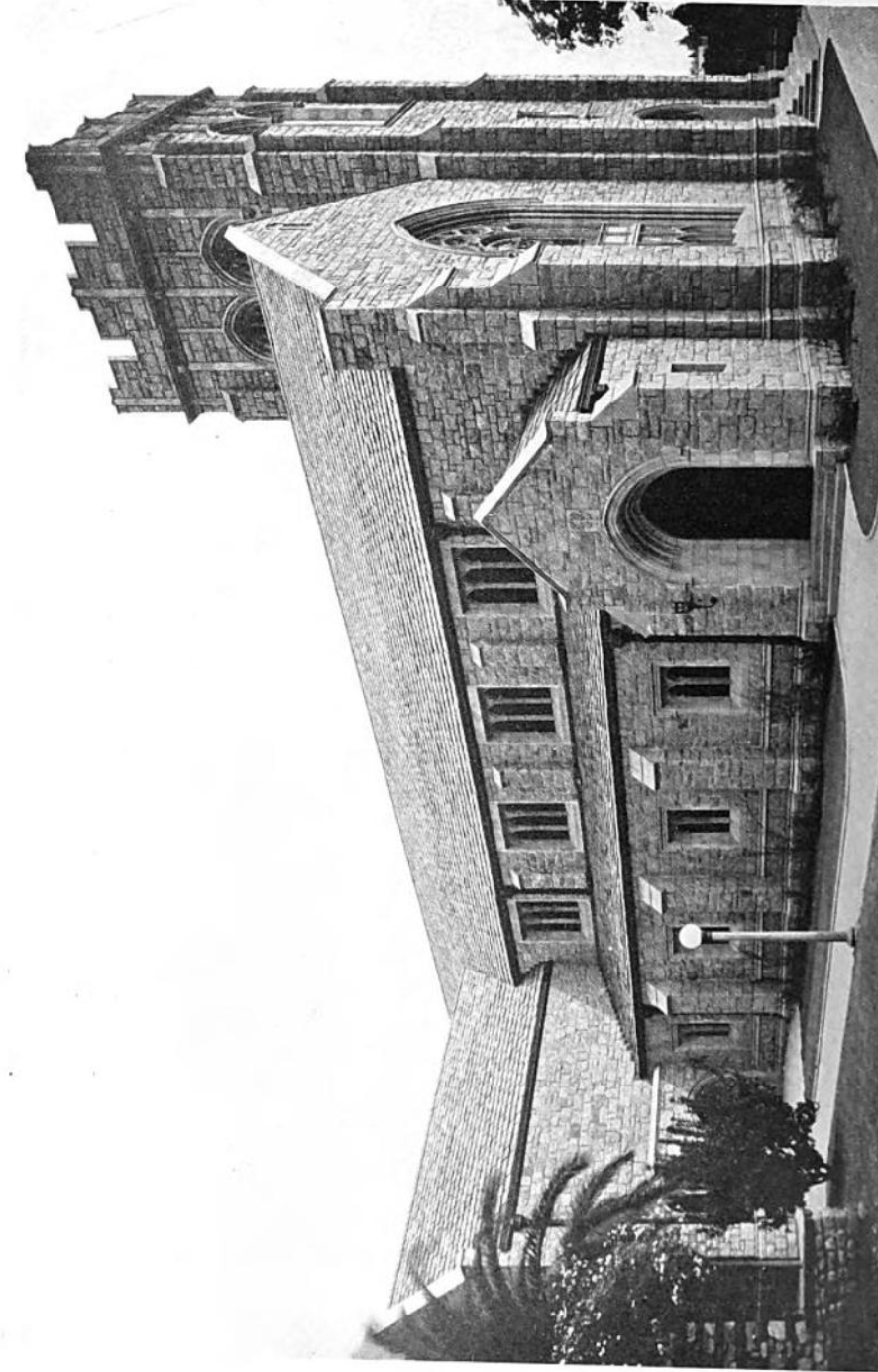
Exterior (1925)

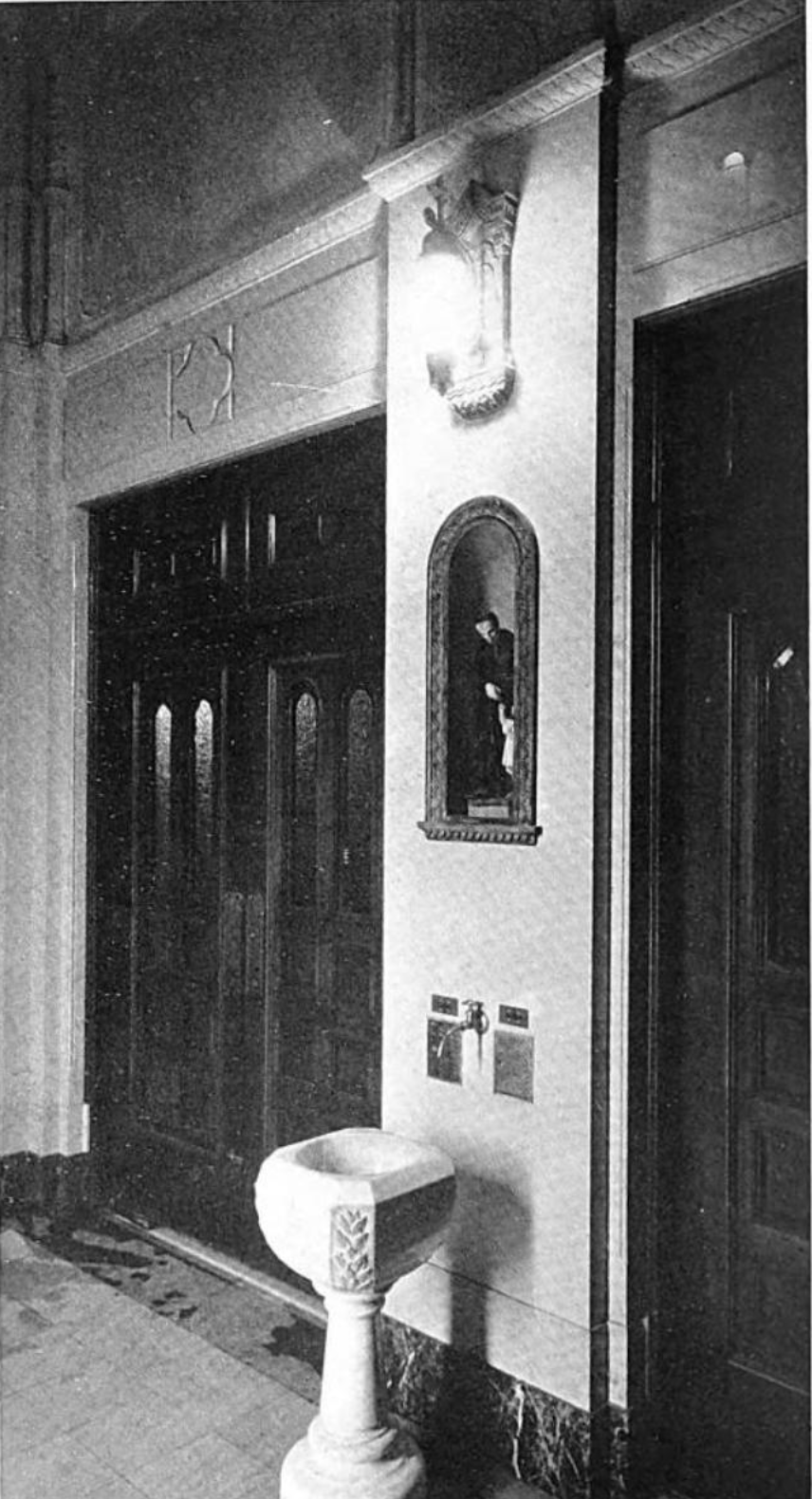
Bracket over holy water faunt (1925)

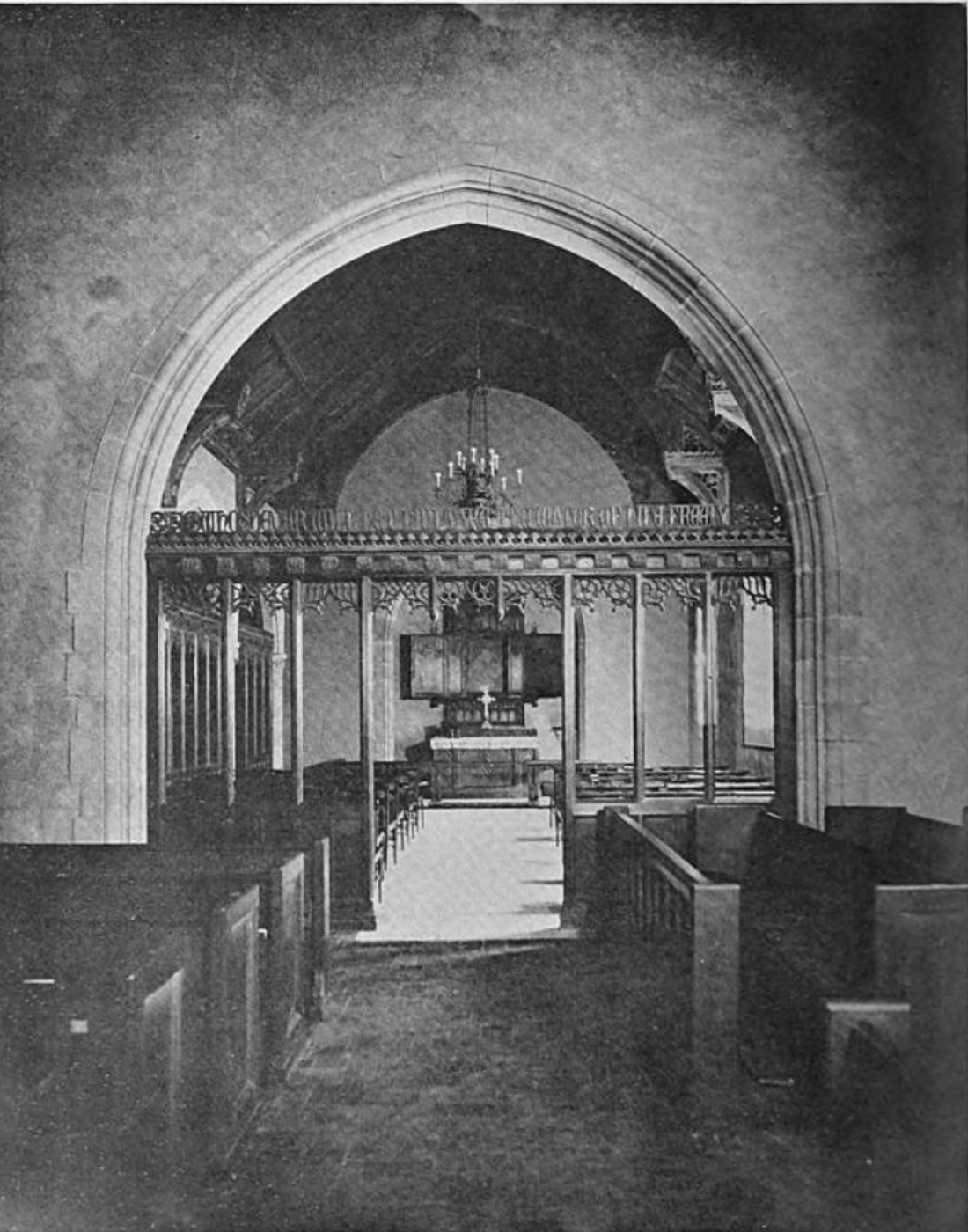
Chapel (1925)

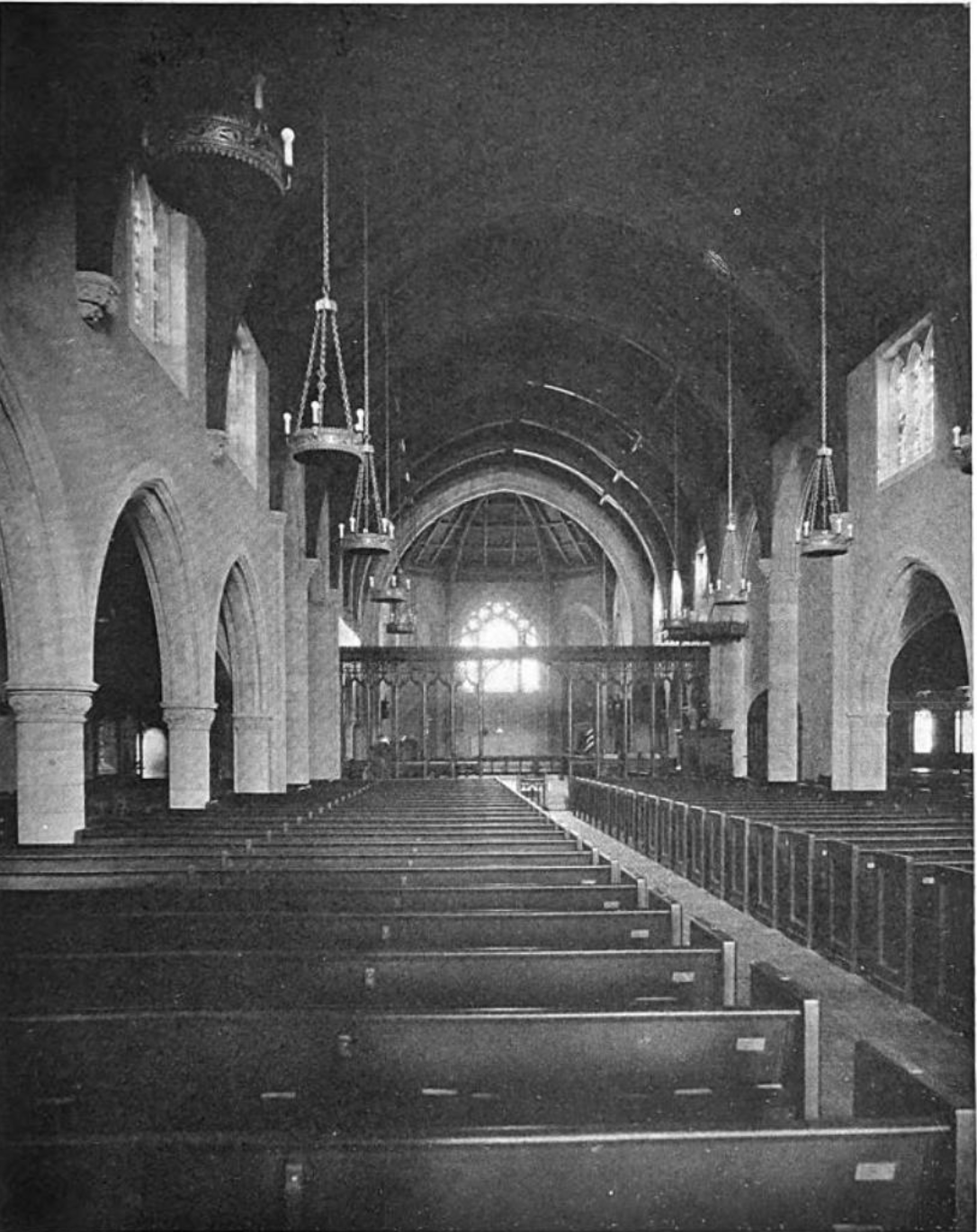
Nave (1925)

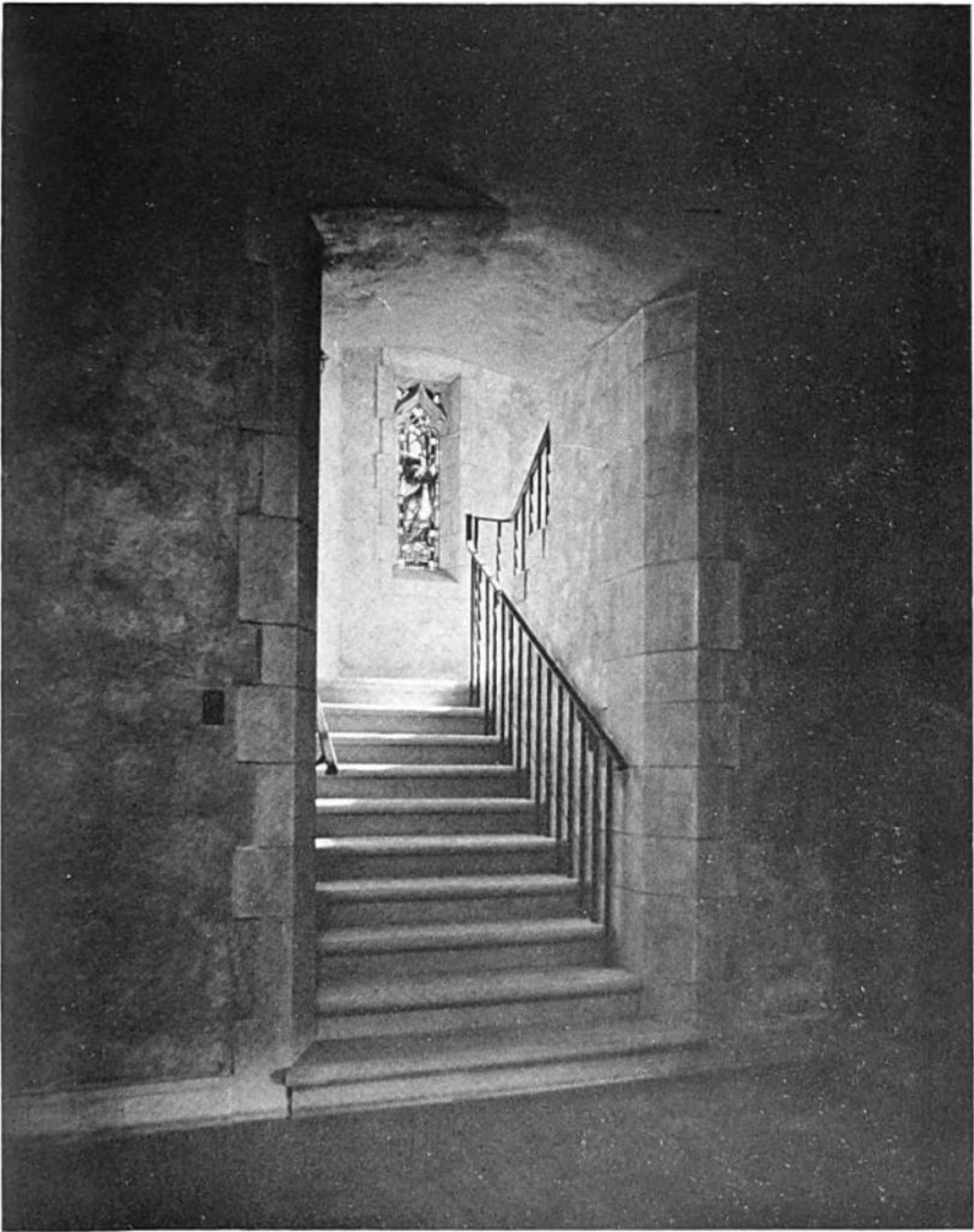
Stairway to balcony (1925)

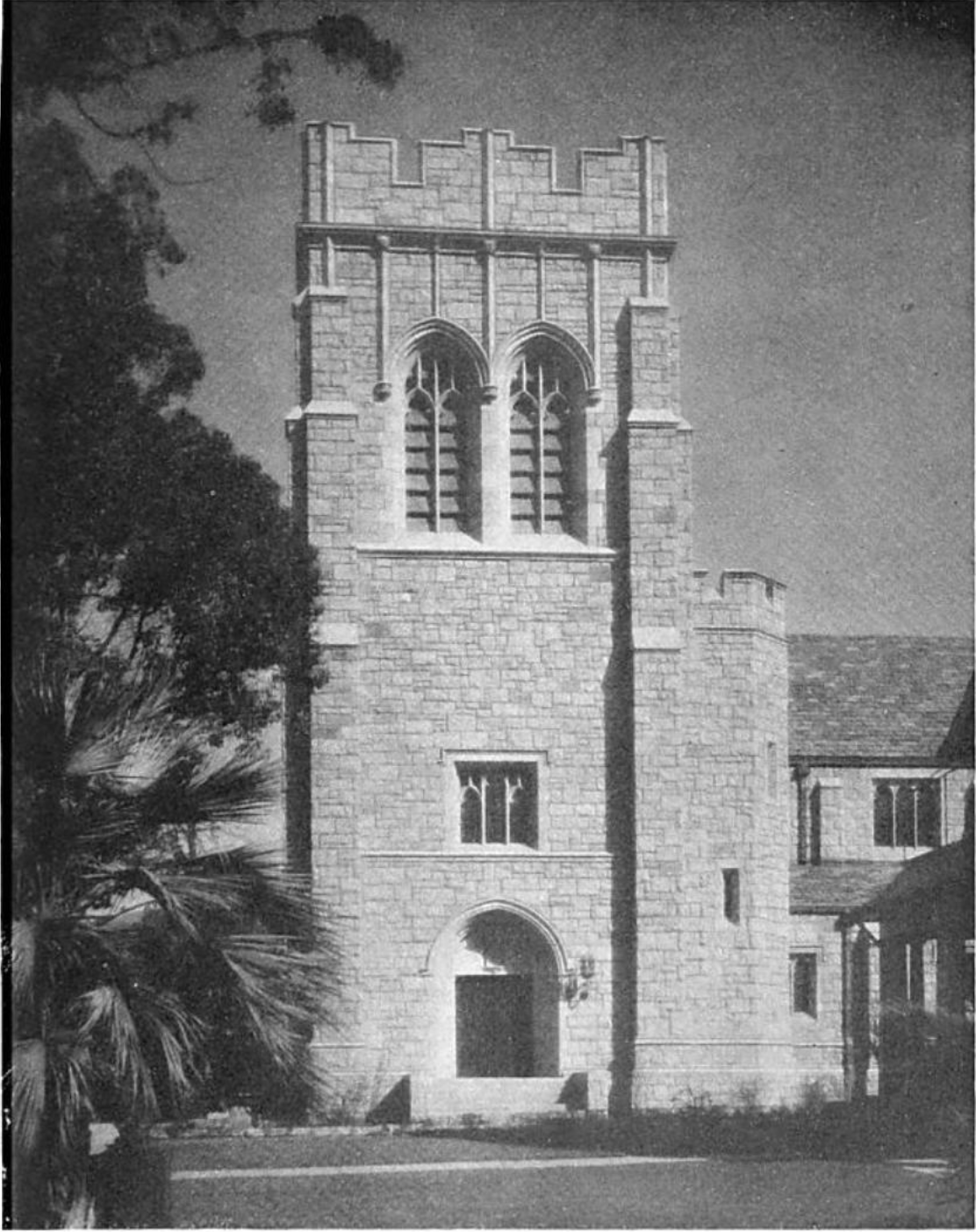
Tower (1925)

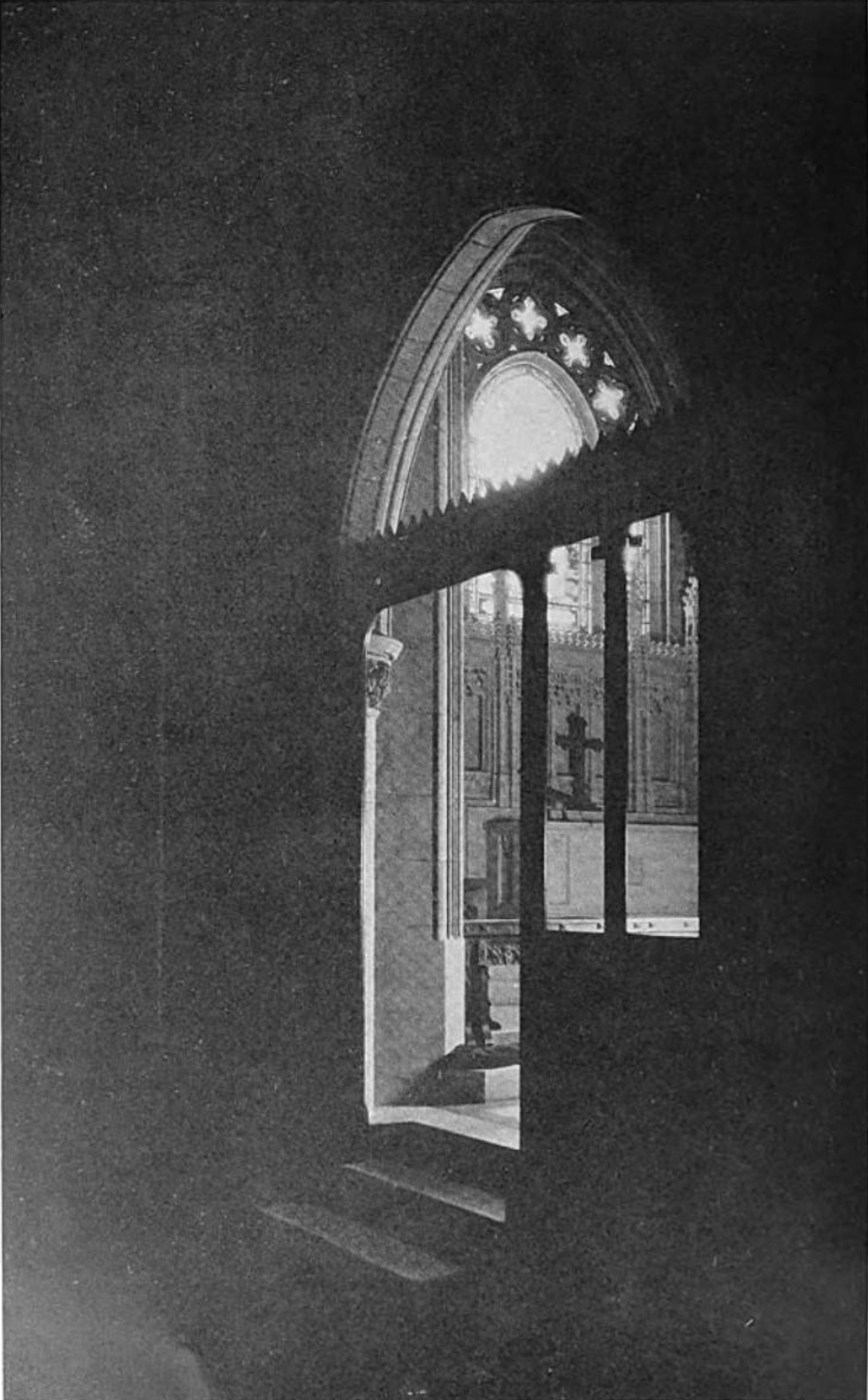
Window (1925)

== See also ==
- Pasadena Civic Center District
