= Mark Nepo =

American poet (born 1951)

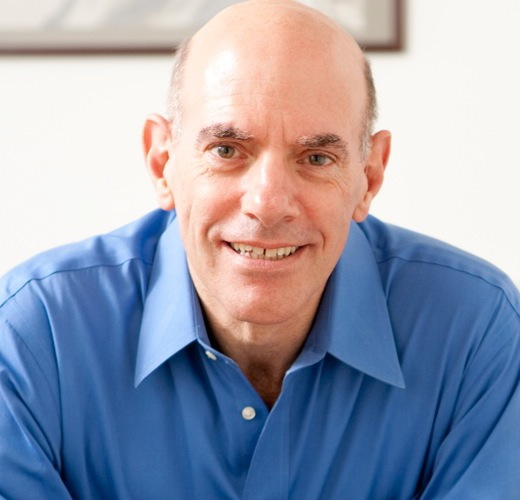
Mark Nepo

Mark Nepo (born February 23, 1951, in Brooklyn, New York), is a poet and spiritual teacher who has taught in the fields of poetry and spirituality for over 40 years. Nepo is best known for his New York Times #1 bestseller, The Book of Awakening. He has published 28 books and recorded 20 audio projects. A cancer survivor, Nepo writes and teaches about the journey of inner transformation and the life of relationship.

== Personal life ==
Nepo has a doctorate in English. He taught for 18 years at the State University of New York at Albany in Albany, New York. He then moved to Kalamazoo, Michigan. In his 30s he was diagnosed with a rare form of lymphoma, a struggle which helped to form his philosophy of experiencing life fully while staying in relationship to an unknowable future.

== Career ==
In 2010, Oprah Winfrey chose Nepo's The Book of Awakening as one of her Ultimate Favorite Things for her farewell season, launching it to the #1 spot on the New York Times bestseller list. Nepo has appeared several times with Oprah Winfrey on her Super Soul Sunday program on OWN TV, and was named to Oprah's SuperSoul100 list of visionaries and influential leaders. He was also interviewed by Robin Roberts on Good Morning America. Oprah has also written about Nepo in her O! magazine column, "What I Know for Sure," and featured him on her "The Life You Want" class on "Being Fully Present" in April 2022. Mark became a regular columnist for Spirituality & Health Magazine in 2017.

== Books ==
- Surviving Storms: Finding the Strength to Meet Adversity (St. Martin's Essentials, 2022)
- 20th Anniversary Edition of The Book of Awakening, with a new Foreword by Jamie Lee Curtis Red Wheel, 2020
- The Book of Soul: 52 Paths to Living What Matters (St. Martin's Essentials, 2020)
- Drinking from the River of Light: The Life of Expression (Sounds True, 2019)
- More Together Than Alone: Discovering the Power and Spirit of Community in Our Lives and in the World (Atria Books, 2018)
- Things that Join the Sea and the Sky (Sounds True, 2017)
- The Way Under the Way: The Place of True Meeting (Sounds True, 2016)
- The One Life We're Given (Atria Books, 2016)
- Inside the Miracle: Enduring Suffering, Approaching Wholeness (Sounds True, 2015)
- The Endless Practice: Becoming Who You Were Born to Be (Atria Books, 2014)
- The Little Book of Awakening (Conari Press, 2013)
- Reduced to Joy (Viva Editions, 2013)
- Seven Thousand Ways to Listen (Free Press, 2012)
- The Book of Awakening (Red Wheel-Conari, 2000)
- As Far As the Heart Can See (HCI Books, Sept 2011)
- Finding Inner Courage (Red Wheel-Conari, Feb 2011, originally published as Facing the Lion, Being the Lion, 2007)
- The Book of Awakening (CD Box Set, Simon & Schuster, March 2011)
- Finding Inner Courage (CD Box Set, Simon & Schuster, March 2011)
- Staying Awake (CD Box Set, Sounds True, Spring 2012)
- Holding Nothing Back (CD Box Set, Sounds True, Spring 2012)
- Surviving Has Made Me Crazy (CavanKerry Press, 2007)
- Unlearning Back to God: Essays on Inwardness (collected essays) (Khaniqahi Nimatullahi Publications, 2006)
- Deepening the American Dream: Reflections on the Inner Life and Spirit of Democracy (Editor) (Jossey-Bass, 2005)
- The Exquisite Risk: Daring to Live an Authentic Life (Three Rivers Press, 2005)
- Suite for the Living (Bread for the Journey International, 2004)
- Inhabiting Wonder (Bread for the Journey International, 2004)
- Acre of Light (Greenfield Review Press, 1994, also available as an audiotape from Parabola under the title Inside the Miracle, 1996)
- Fire Without Witness (British American Ltd., 1988)
- God, the Maker of the Bed, and the Painter (Greenfield Review Press, 1988)

Nepo's works have been translated into twenty languages, including French, Portuguese, Japanese, and Danish.
