= Elizabeth Lesser =

Author and co-founder/senior adviser of Omega Institute, Rhinebeck, NY, US

Elizabeth Lesser is the co-founder and senior adviser of Omega Institute, the largest adult education center in the United States focusing on health, wellness, spirituality and creativity. She is the author of Broken Open: How Difficult Times Can Help Us Grow and A Seeker's Guide: Making Your Life a Spiritual Adventure.

For more than 30 years, Lesser has studied and worked with leading figures in the fields of healing, spiritual development and cultural change. Her work at Omega has included co-directing the organization, curriculum research, conference weaving, teaching and writing the yearly Omega catalog, a reference book that describes the work of some of the most eminent thinkers and practitioners of our times. She has shared her work and teachings at TED and on Oprah's Super Soul Sunday.

Lesser attended Barnard College and San Francisco State University. Before Omega, she was a midwife and birth educator. She has been active in local environmental issues for many years in New York's Hudson Valley, where she lives with her husband. She is the mother of three sons.
