= George F. Regas =

American Episcopalian priest (1930–2021)

The Reverend George F. Regas
- Rector emeritus of All Saints Church, Pasadena
- Regas in 2017
- Church: All Saints Episcopal Church, Pasadena, California, U.S.
- Province: Episcopal Church in the United States
- Diocese: Los Angeles
- In office: 1967–1995
- Predecessor: John Harris Burt
- Successor: J. Edwin Bacon, Jr.
- Other post: Priest-in-charge of the Episcopal Church of the Messiah, Pulaski, Tennessee (1957–60) Rector of Grace Church in Nyack, New York (1960–67)

Orders
- Ordination: June 1, 1957

Personal details
- Born: George Frank Regas; October 1, 1930 Knoxville, Tennessee
- Died: January 3, 2021 (aged 90) Pasadena, California
- Denomination: Episcopalian
- Spouse: Mary McCaslin
- Occupation: Retired
- Profession: Priest

George Frank Regas (October 1, 1930 – January 3, 2021) was an Episcopal priest. He served as rector of All Saints Episcopal Church, Pasadena, California, from 1967 until his retirement in 1995.

== Early life and career ==
Regas was born in Knoxville, Tennessee, the son of Greek immigrants, and was baptized into the Greek Orthodox Church. There was no Orthodox priest in Knoxville. His mother died when he was about five years old, leaving him to be raised by his father. When he was about ten, he became friends with an Episcopal priest in Knoxville and began attending services at the Episcopal church. By the time he was of college age, he had apparently embraced the Episcopal church.

He attended and graduated from the Episcopal Divinity School in Cambridge, Massachusetts, and was ordained a priest in 1956. His first church was a mission of fifty members in Pulaski, Tennessee. (Note: Regas told McBroom that he spent two years at Pulaski, Tennessee after returning from Cambridge, and that the work was very hard because of the Ku Klux Klan organization there.) He was then sent to an 800-member church in Nyack, New York, where he served as rector.

After his ordination, Regas went to England, where he spent two years at Cambridge University, and pursued graduate studies under Anglican Bishop John A.T. Robinson, who he later referred to as his friend and mentor. Robinson was a theologian and author of the book, Honest to God, which questioned many traditional concepts. In 1972, Regas graduated from the Theology School at Claremont with the doctor of religion degree.

== Tenure at All Saints ==
Regas succeeded John Burt as rector of All Saints Episcopal Church in Pasadena, California, in 1966, when he was only 36 years old. (Note: Burt later became Bishop of Ohio.) During his tenure, Regas did much to establish All Saints as an influential parish within the liberal wing of the Episcopal Church, and as an important voice for mainline liberal Protestant Christianity nationally. Under Regas's leadership, All Saints, Pasadena, became the largest Episcopal Church in the western United States, and established the largest service center for serving HIV and AIDS victims in the San Gabriel Valley. It also started Union Station in Pasadena for assisting the homeless.

He led All Saints in the foundation of the Young & Healthy program, which helps uninsured and under-insured children. He was the president of the Coalition for a Non-Violent City and co-founder of the Interfaith Center to Reverse the Arms Race. As a long-time national leader of the Episcopal Church, he was nominated as a candidate for bishop of New York, San Francisco, and Los Angeles, but consistently declined in order to continue to build the All Saints Pasadena parish. As a founder of the Interfaith Center to Reverse the Arms Race, he was a leader in efforts to unite Christians, Muslims, Jews and other faiths to promote peace in the Middle East and worldwide.

== Activism ==
=== Supporting United Farm Workers Union ===
Regas' first controversy as rector arose a few months after he arrived. A representative from the United Farm Workers Union, saying that the union would like to set up an information table on the church lawn and pass out information about the struggles of Cesar Chavez, who had organized the union. The representative told Regas that his predecessor had been very supportive of the union. Regas thought the request was reasonable and agreed. He then learned that a member of the congregation was one of the largest corporate farmers in the nation, and was incensed by Regas' action. Regas said he tried for six months to heal the rift, but failed. The farmer angrily left the church.

=== Opposition to Vietnam War ===
Regas was a critic of certain American foreign and domestic policies, reaching national attention in a 1971 sermon, "Mr. President, the Jury Is In", against the Vietnamese War, responding to a press conference by United States President Richard Nixon in which he appealed to the American public to stand behind him about the Vietnam War.

=== Opposition to Iraq War ===
On the Sunday before the 2004 Presidential election, Regas preached a sermon opposing the Iraq War. The premise of the sermon was a debate between George W. Bush and John Kerry moderated by Jesus Christ. In the sermon Regas supposed that, "Jesus [would say], 'Mr. President, your doctrine of preemptive war is a failed doctrine. Forcibly changing the regime of an enemy that posed no imminent threat has led to disaster.'"

Complaints about the sermon led to an investigation by the Internal Revenue Service (IRS) into whether the sermon voided the church's tax-exempt status as a prohibited political endorsement. The church responded by claiming that the IRS is selectively enforcing the rule by not pursuing actions against conservative churches. In response to the investigation, Rector Ed Bacon gave a sermon called, "Neighbor Love is Never Neutral." (Note: Bacon had replaced George Regas, who had retired as rector in 1995. Changing rectors had not changed the church's position in the controversy.)

== Notes ==
Preceded by John Harris Burt	Rector, All Saints Episcopal Church, Pasadena, California; 1967–1995	Succeeded by J. Ed Bacon
