= Debbie Ford =

American author, coach, lecturer, and teacher (1955–2013)

- Born: October 1, 1955
- Died: February 17, 2013 (aged 57); San Diego County, California, U.S.
- Occupation: Self-help author
- Notable work: The Dark Side of the Light Chasers (1998)
- Website: www.debbieford.com

Debbie Ford (October 1, 1955 – February 17, 2013) was an American self-help author, coach, lecturer and teacher, most known for The New York Times best-selling book, The Dark Side of the Light Chasers (1998), which aimed to help readers overcome their shadow side with the help of modern psychology and spiritual practices. In following years, she went on to write eight more books including Spiritual Divorce, Why Good People Do Bad Things, and The 21-Day Consciousness Cleanse, which have sold over 1 million copies and been translated into 32 languages. She led workshops on "Shadow Process" and hosted TV and radio shows, and also established the "Ford Institute for Transformational Training".

== Career ==
After Oprah Winfrey discussed Ford's first book, The Dark Side of the Light Chasers (1998), on her show in late 2000, it spent several weeks on The New York Times bestseller list in late 2000 and early 2001. Her other books that made the list were Why Good People Do Bad Things (2008) and The Shadow Effect: Illuminating the Hidden Power of Your True Self (2010), written in collaboration with Deepak Chopra and Marianne Williamson.

Over the years, in a career spanning 20 years, she gave workshops and lectures across the US and trained coaches on the "shadow process". She appeared on Oprah, Good Morning America, Larry King Live, The Big Idea with Donny Deutsch, and Fox & Friends, and was a regular contributor to Oprah.com and Huffington Post. She hosted a weekly talk radio show on Hay House Radio, titled Shadow Talk. She produced and appeared in the documentary The Shadow Effect (2009), and also in 3 Magic Words (2010).

She appeared as a life coach helping people with divorce on ABC's short-lived reality series The Ex-Wives Club (2007). In 2012, she appeared on Super Soul Sunday (Season 2), a talk show hosted by Oprah Winfrey, airing on OWN: The Oprah Winfrey Network in an episode titled "Debbie Ford: Out of the Shadows", in which she talked about her eleven-year-old struggle with cancer.According to her sister Arielle, Ford's goal was to help people overcome emotional burdens and fears that held them back

Ford lived in the seaside community of La Jolla, San Diego County. She died at her home on February 17, 2013, after a prolonged battle with cancer, aged 57.

== Works ==
- Embracing Your Shadow. Hay House, 2002. ISBN 1561709433.
- Spiritual Divorce. Hodder Hb, 2002. ISBN 0340820950.
- Dark Side of the Light Chasers. Hodder & Stoughton, (Reprint) 2011. ISBN 1444717456.
- The Best Year Of Your Life Kit. Hay House, 2005. ISBN 1401904793.
- A Letter from Heaven: God's Gifts to a Mother, Through the Death of Her Daughter, with Allen Guyer. Morris Pub., 2003. ISBN 0974088706.
- Why Good People Do Bad Things. HarperCollins, 2009. ISBN 0061756148.
- The Secret of the Shadow. HarperCollins, 2009. ISBN 0061847372.
- The Right Questions. HarperCollins, 2009. ISBN 0061870072.
- The Best Year of Your Life. HarperCollins, 2009. ISBN 0061738980.
- The Shadow Effect: Illuminating the Hidden Power of Your True Self, with Deepak Chopra, Marianne Williamson. HarperOne, 2010. ISBN 0-06-196265-1.
- The 21-Day Consciousness Cleanse: A Breakthrough Program for Connecting with Your Soul's Deepest Purpose. (reprint) HarperCollins, 2010. ISBN 0061783692.
- Courage: Overcoming Fear and Igniting Self-Confidence. Wayne Dyer (Foreword). HarperCollins, 2012. ISBN 0062068997.
