= Shawn Achor =

American author, and speaker (born 1978)

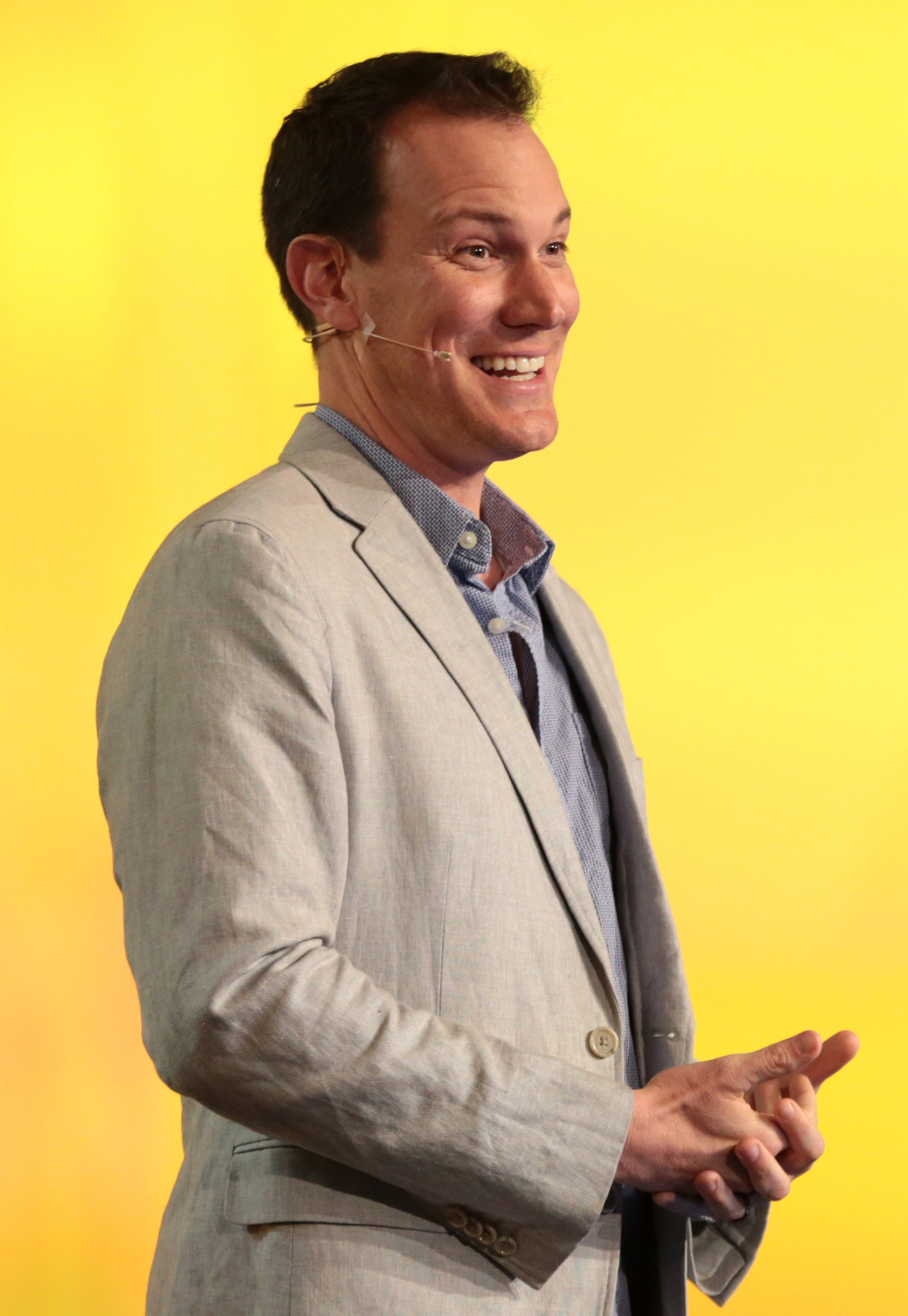
- Achor in 2017
- Born: March 9, 1978 (age 48); Waco, Texas, U.S.
- Education: BA, Harvard University; MA, Harvard Divinity School
- Occupations: happiness researcher, bestselling author, corporate speaker
- Organization(s): GoodThink, Institute of Applied Positive Research
- Known for: Positive Psychology, finding success through happiness "happiness is a choice, happiness is an advantage, happiness spreads"
- Notable work: The Happiness Advantage, The Orange Frog, Before Happiness
- Website: www.goodthinkinc.com

Shawn Achor (born March 9, 1978) is an American author and speaker known for his advocacy of positive psychology. He authored The Happiness Advantage and founded GoodThink, Inc.

== Education ==
Achor received a Bachelor of Arts from Harvard University and a Master of Arts in Christian and Buddhist Ethics from Harvard Divinity School.

== Career ==
After college and divinity school, Achor worked as a freshman proctor and teaching assistant at Harvard University. He was one of the teaching assistants for Tal Ben-Shahar's popular "Happiness" course.

In 2007, Achor co-founded GoodThinkInc with his sister, Amy Blankson, and then later co-founded The Institute for Applied Positive Research with his wife, Michelle Gielan. The company consists of researchers, speakers, and trainers who offer positive psychology-related services to improve work performance.

Achor presented at TEDx, and his talk is listed as one of TED's 25 most popular with more than with 20 million views online. This book features research that Achor conducted with Ali Crum and Prof. Peter Salovey at Yale University at the large Swiss bank UBS, which was published in The Journal of Personality and Social Psychology, and provided evidence that changing one's mindset about stress changes the physical effects of stress. His most recent book, Big Potential, was published in 2018 and expands his research beyond the individual by looking at how empowering others helps us all reach our fullest potential. Achor also frequently writes for the Harvard Business Review, with more than thirty five articles in both the online and print versions of the journal.

Achor launched a two-part online learning class with the Oprah Winfrey network in 2015 after being interviewed for two sessions of Oprah Winfrey's Super Soul Sunday television series in 2014. Achor was named to Oprah's SuperSoul100 list of visionaries and influential leaders in 2016.

Achor co-authored the children's book Ripple's Effect with his sister, Amy Blankson, as a way to bring positive psychology concepts to children. The book was later bought by Source Books and renamed How to Make a Shark Smile.

== Criticisms ==
Alison Beard, in an article in the Harvard Business Review, briefly describes several recent critiques of positive thinking, points out that Martin Seligman, the father of positive psychology, said that the feeling of happiness is only one element of a fulfilling life, and goes on to say "Where most of the happiness gurus go wrong is insisting that daily if not constant happiness is a means to long-term fulfillment. For some glass-half-full optimists, that may be true. They can “stumble on happiness” the way the field's most prominent researcher, Dan Gilbert, suggests; or gain “the happiness advantage” that the professor-turned-consultant Shawn Achor talks about; or “broadcast happiness,” as Michelle Gielan, Achor's wife and partner at the firm GoodThink, recommends in her new book. As I said, it apparently takes just a few simple tricks. But for the rest of us, that much cheer feels forced, so it's unlikely to help us mold meaningful relationships or craft the perfect career."

Poor Ash's Almanack states "My much bigger disagreement is with Achor’s anti-defensive-pessimism stance: for all the good that Before Happiness did me (and believe me, it was a lot), abandoning defensive pessimism was a painful and emotionally damaging mistake. I explain my contrasting viewpoint pretty extensively in the notes, but simply put, I think Achor creates a false dichotomy between having a growth mindset and approaching the world with a “positive mental attitude” (as Gonzales might put it), and using a margin of safety to overcome loss aversion."
