= Lon Milo DuQuette =

American writer, lecturer, musician, and occultist

- DuQuette in 2011
- Born: July 11, 1948 (age 78); Long Beach, California, U.S.
- Occupations: Musician, author
- Website: www.lonmiloduquette.net

Lon Milo DuQuette (born July 11, 1948), also known as Rabbi Lamed Ben Clifford and by his neo-Gnostic bishop title of Tau Lamed, is an American writer, lecturer, musician, and occultist, best known as an author who applies humor in the field of Western Hermeticism.

== Early life ==
Lon Milo DuQuette was born in Long Beach, California. He was raised in Columbus, Nebraska.

== Career ==
Originally a recording artist, in the 1970s he released two singles and an album, Charley D. and Milo, on the Epic Records label. He and his partner Charles Dennis Harris, aka Charley Packard (now deceased), opened for Hoyt Axton, Arlo Guthrie and performed with Sammy Davis Jr.

In 1972, DuQuette quit the music business to pursue his interest in mysticism, particularly the work of Aleister Crowley (1875–1947). He is on the faculty of the Omega Institute for Holistic Studies in Rhinebeck, New York where he teaches The Western Magical Tradition.

=== Ordo Templi Orientis ===
Since 1975 DuQuette has been a National and International governing officer of Ordo Templi Orientis, a religious and fraternal organization founded in the early part of the 20th century. Since 1996 he has been O.T.O.'s United States Deputy Grand Master. He is also an Archbishop of Ecclesia Gnostica Catholica, the ecclesiastical arm of O.T.O.

=== Writing ===
DuQuette began writing professionally in 1988 and has published 19 books, that have translated in 12 languages, a number of which are in the Western mystical tradition: Freemasonry, Tarot, Qabalah, ceremonial magick, the Enochian magick of Dr. John Dee, and Goetic spirit evocation. He has also written on analyzing the works of Aleister Crowley, an English occultist, author, poet and philosopher. But Duquette is proudest of being an "author who injects humor into the serious subjects of magick and the occult."

== Return to music ==
A 2005 gift of a ukulele re-ignited DuQuette's interest in music. Two self-released CDs and a new record contract followed. In 2012, DuQuette released I'm Baba Lon on Ninety Three Records, his first studio album in 40 years. On September 3, 2012, Ninety Three released the follow-up, Baba Lon II.

== Personal life ==
DuQuette is married to his high school sweetheart, Constance Jean Duquette. They live in California and have one son.

== Works ==
=== Books ===
- DuQuette, Lon Milo: & Aleister Crowley, Christopher Hyatt: Enochian World of Aleister Crowley: Enochian Sex Magick, New Falcon, 1991.
- DuQuette, Lon Milo: & Christopher Hyatt: Sex Magic, Tantra & Tarot: The Way of the Secret Lover, New Falcon, 1991.
- DuQuette, Lon Milo: & Aleister Crowley, Christopher Hyatt: Aleister Crowley's Illustrated Goetia: Sexual Evocation, New Falcon, 1992.
- DuQuette, Lon Milo: Tarot of Ceremonial Magick: A Pictorial Synthesis of Three Great Pillars of Magick: Enochian, Goetia, Astrology, Weiser Books, 1995.
- DuQuette, Lon Milo: Angels, Demons & Gods of the New Millennium, Weiser Books, 1997.
- DuQuette, Lon Milo: My Life With the Spirits: The Adventures of a Modern Magician, Weiser Books, 1999.
- DuQuette, Lon Milo: The Chicken Qabalah of Rabbi Lamed Ben Clifford: Dilettante's Guide to What You Do and Do Not Need to Know to Become a Qabalist, Weiser Books, 2001.
- DuQuette, Lon Milo: The Magick of Aleister Crowley: A Handbook of the Rituals of Thelema, Weiser Books, 2003.
- DuQuette, Lon Milo: Understanding Aleister Crowley's Thoth Tarot, Weiser Books, 2003.
- DuQuette, Lon Milo: The Book Of Ordinary Oracles, Weiser Books, 2005.
- DuQuette, Lon Milo: The Key to Solomon's Key: Secrets of Magic and Masonry, Ccc Publishing, 2006.
- DuQuette, Lon Milo: Enochian Vision Magick, Weiser Books, 2008.
- DuQuette, Lon Milo: Low Magick: It's All In Your Head... You Just Have No Idea How Big Your Head Is, Llewellyn Publications, 2010.
- DuQuette, Lon Milo: Ask Baba Lon: Answers to Questions of Life & Magick, New Falcon Publications, 2011.
- DuQuette, Lon Milo: Homemade Magick: The Musings & Mischief of a Do-It-Yourself Magus, Llewellyn Publications, 2014: REDFeather Schifferm 2016.
- DuQuette, Lon Milo: Son of Chicken Qabalah: Rabbi Lamed Ben Clifford's Mostly Painless Qabalah Course, Weiser Books, 2018.
- DuQuette, Lon Milo: Allow Me To Introduce: An Insider's Guide to the Occult Weiser Books, 2020.
- DuQuette, Lon Milo & Shoemaker, David (editors): Llewellyn's Complete Book of Ceremonial Magick: A Comprehensive Guide to the Western Mystery Tradition, Llewellyn Publications, 2020.
- DuQuette, Lon Milo: An Accidental Christ: The Story of Jesus as Told by His Uncle, Llewellyn Publications, 2023.
- DuQuette, Lon Milo: The Tarot Architect: How to Become A Master Builder of Your Spiritual Temple, Red Wheel/Weiser, 2025.
- DuQuette, Lon Milo & Bratkowsky, James M: "Young Aleister Crowley and The Magicians' Revolt" Weiser Books, 2026.

=== Music ===
- Charley D. And Milo—Charley D. Harris and Lon Milo DuQuette, Epic, 1970.
- I'm Baba Lon, Ninety Three Records, 2012.
- Baba Lon II, Ninety Three Records, 2012.
- Gentle Heretic, Ninety Three Records, 2013.
- Sweet Baba Lon, Ninety Three Records, 2015.

=== Other media ===
- Lon Milo DuQuette's Enochian Magick - The Art of Angelic Evocation, Hooded Man Productions. 1994.
- Magical Egypt, Cydonia, Inc. 2000.
- Qabalah For the Rest of Us, Cydonia, Inc. 2002.
- The Great Work, Cydonia, Inc. 2008.
- Lon Milo DuQuette Live and Uncensored—Tarot Kabbalah & Oracles, Cydonia, Inc. 2005.
- The Call—Dieter Müh and Lon Milo Duquette, HaemOccult, 2009.
- Tarot of Ceremonial Magic Deck which was revised 2020 by Next Millennium

== See also ==
- English Qaballa
- Members of OTO
