= Ed Bacon (priest) =

American Episcopal priest

The Reverend Ed Bacon
- Rector of All Saints Church, Pasadena
- Church: Episcopal Church
- Diocese: Los Angeles
- In office: 1995–2016
- Predecessor: George F. Regas
- Previous posts: Dean, St. Andrew’s Cathedral (Jackson, Mississippi)

Orders
- Ordination: 1983

Personal details
- Born: J. Edwin Bacon Jr. February 14, 1948 (age 78) Jesup, Georgia, US
- Denomination: Anglicanism
- Spouse: Hope Hendricks-Bacon
- Occupation: Episcopal priest
- Education: Mercer College; Emory University

James Edwin Bacon Jr. (born February 14, 1948), known as Ed Bacon, is a retired priest in the Diocese of Los Angeles in the Episcopal Church in the United States of America and was the rector of All Saints Church, Pasadena, 1995–2016. Prior to coming to All Saints Church, Bacon served as dean of the Cathedral of Saint Andrew in Jackson, Mississippi; Rector of St Mark’s in Dalton, Georgia; and dean of students and campus ministry at Mercer University. He also graduated from Candler School of Theology at Emory University. As an ordained priest he was known for his active support of LGBT rights, peace, and interfaith causes. He retired on May 1, 2016, but later returned to active ministry as an interim rector.

== Early life ==
Born in Jesup, Georgia, (February 14, 1948), Bacon is the son of a Baptist minister who was also the superintendent of the Wayne County Schools. He grew up in a politically and theologically conservative environment, and, at the urging of his father, he attended Mercer University in Macon, Georgia with the intent of becoming a physician. It was at Mercer where Bacon’s viewpoint of “inclusive compassion and justice for everyone” gradually developed.

In 1967, while a student at Mercer, Bacon had a chance encounter with Martin Luther King Jr. at the baggage claim in the Atlanta airport. That chance meeting inspired Bacon, who was already familiar with King’s writings, to reread the Bible through a new lens. It was then that Bacon realized the Bible’s focus was not about tribalism and separation, but rather it was about overcoming fear-based tribalism and separation with inclusion and universal compassion.

After graduating from Mercer in 1969, Bacon attended Vanderbilt University Law School in Nashville, Tennessee, for three semesters. While there, he was introduced to the writings of Thomas Merton, a twentieth-century Catholic priest and monk who wrote about the true self versus the false self. Merton’s writings resonated with Bacon and helped him realize that a career in law was not his calling. Since dropping out of law school would invalidate his protected delay status for the Vietnam War draft, Bacon, who was morally opposed to the war, applied for conscientious objector status and was discharged after serving alternative service teaching children with learning delays.

After leaving law school, Bacon returned to Mercer and became the school’s campus minister and dean of students. During his seven years in that position, he frequently visited and taught at a nearby Episcopal church. In the process, he gained a deeper understanding of the Episcopal faith and connected with Episcopal beliefs.

In 1977, Bacon went on sabbatical from his job at Mercer and attended Candler School of Theology at Emory in Atlanta, Georgia where he studied the interface of theology and psychology. While there, Bacon approached the local Episcopal bishop and requested to become an Episcopal priest. After serving as a youth minister at St. Luke’s Episcopal Church in Atlanta, Georgia, he was granted admission as a postulant for the priesthood. Bacon graduated from the Candler School of Theology at Emory in 1979 and was ordained in the Episcopal Church in 1983.

== All Saints Episcopal Church - Pasadena ==
In 1995, Bacon became rector of All Saints Episcopal Church in Pasadena, California. Founded in 1885, the church was well-established. It reportedly has the largest congregation of any Episcopal Church in the Western United States.

Bacon co-founded "Beyond Inclusion" and "Claiming the Blessing", two organizations that advocated for LGBT rights within the Episcopal Church. He conducted wedding ceremonies for any couple that wished to marry in All Saints after California made gay and lesbian weddings legal. In addition to his regular duties as a rector, he was very active in the wider community. He co-founded Interfaith Communities United for Justice and Peace (ICUJP) and Abrahamic Faiths Peacemaking Initiative (AFPI). He also founded an interfaith group, New Vision Partners, whose purpose was to develop young peace and justice leaders to live successfully in 21st century interfaith environment. He also served on Human Rights Watch California Committee South and on other national and community boards.

== Media attention ==
A progressive spokesperson on issues of faith and justice for all regardless of race, gender, faith, or sexual orientation, Bacon has been featured in national media including being a guest panelist in the Spirituality 101 segment of The Oprah Winfrey Show’s “Living Your Best Life” series. In January 2009 his statement to a call-in viewer that “being gay is a gift from God” received national attention. As a result, Bacon was invited to return to the show and soon became a regular on Oprah’s Soul Series on Oprah & Friends Radio, recording two shows a month for eighteen months.

Bacon’s stance on homosexuality and gay marriage has been well documented. All Saints Church, where he is a rector, has been blessing same-sex unions since the early 1990s, before his arrival. Prior to him taking his post at All Saints Church, Bacon had to decide whether to continue with the blessings. He decided in favor of it.

Bacon contributed to Truthdig, Huffington Post, and Oprah.com. He is also the author of the book 8 Habits of Love: Open Your Heart, Open Your Mind (Grand Central Life & Style, September 2012).

According to Episcopal News, more than 2,000 people filled the street between All Saints Church and the Pasadena City Hall on Easter Sunday, May 1, 2016, the day of Bacon's retirement from the church. He and his wife relocated to Alabama, to live closer to their children and grandchildren.

== Awards and recognition ==
In 1999, his alma mater, the Candler School of Theology at Emory University, named him as its Whiteside Distinguished Preacher. His undergraduate school, Mercer University, conferred an honorary Doctor of Humanities degree in May, 1999; and in May, 2005, Church Divinity School of the Pacific conferred an honorary Doctor of Ministry degree. In December, 2005, he was named an Honorary Canon of the Cathedral Center of St. Paul, Los Angeles by Bishop J. Jon Bruno.

Bacon has received numerous honors for his peace and interfaith work, including:

Candler School of Theology at Emery	1999	Whiteside Distinguished Preacher
Mercer University	5/1999	Honorary Doctor of Humanities
Church Divinity School of the Pacific	5/2005	Honorary Doctor of Divinity
Pas Human Relations Commission	6/2005	Models of Unity Award (ASC)
Islamic Center of So California	9/11/05	Peace and Compassion Award
Episcopal Diocese of Los Angeles	12/2/05	Honorary Canon of the Cathedral of St. Paul
LA County Children & Family Svcs	7/6/06	Svc to and Support of Foster Children
ACLU of Southern California	9/10/06	Religious Freedom Award
Islamic Shura Council	10/2006	Peace Award (ASC and its leadership)
Rainbow/PUSH Coalition	10/9/06	Acts of Courage Award
NAACP Pasadena Branch	9/13/07	Faith Award (Unity Builds A Community)
ACLU Pasadena-Foothill Chapter	9/23/07	Standing Up for Civil Liberties Award
Pasadena Magazine	12/2011	named a Pasadena Power Player
THE Magazine	6/21/12	named one of the 50 Most Innovative Men

== Retirement ==
In retirement Bacon has served as interim rector of fiour churches, St. Luke’s Episcopal Church in Atlanta, Georgia (2019-2021), St. Paul’s Episcopal Church in Chattanooga, Tennessee (2024-2025), All Saints' Episcopal Church in Homewood, Alabama (2025-2026), and St. Paul's Episcopal Church in New Orleans, Louisiana..

== Personal ==
Bacon is married to Hope Hendricks-Bacon and they have two adult children Alice and Peter and three grandchildren, Sarah, Luke and Thomas.
