= Adyashanti =

American spiritual author

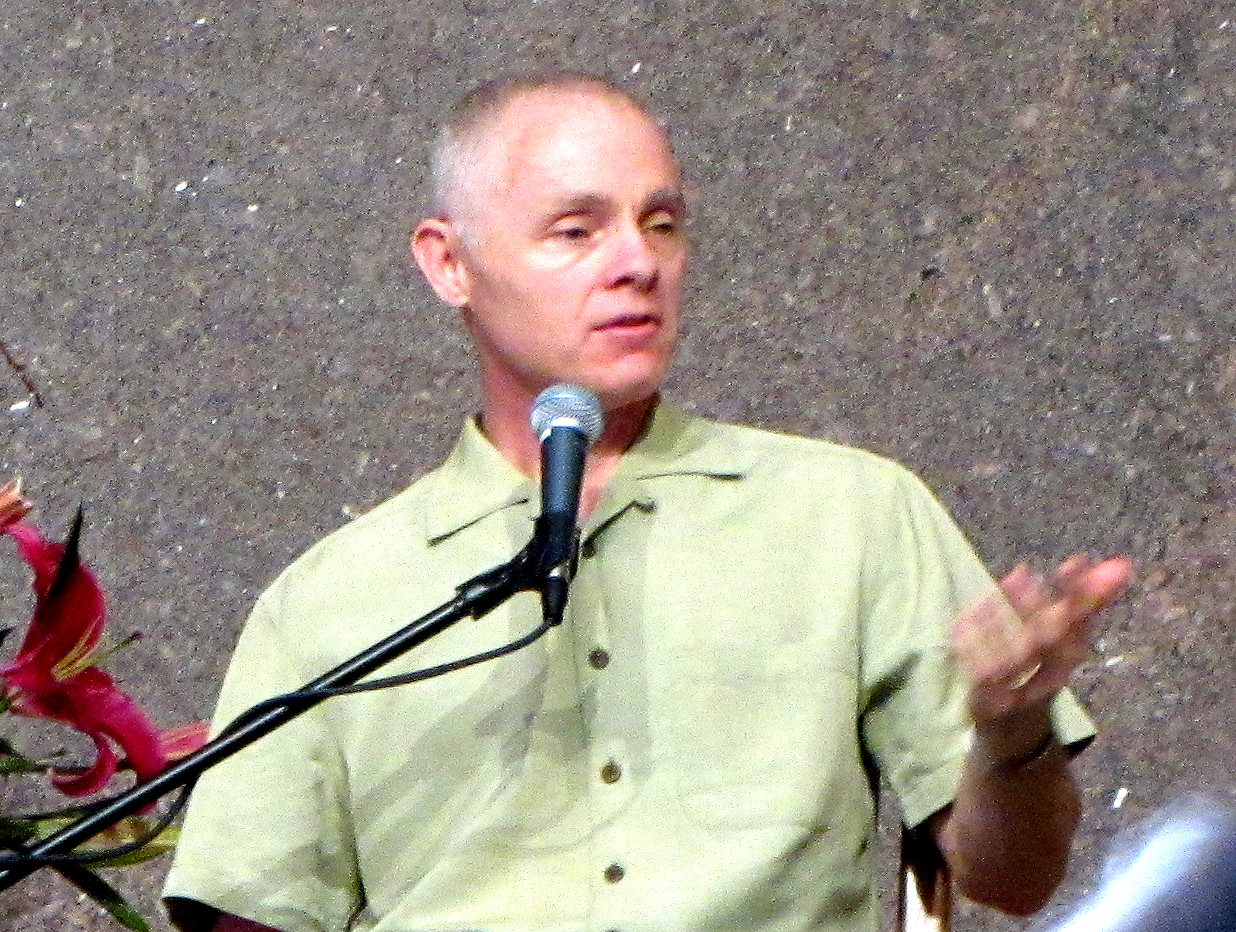
- Adyashanti in 2013
- Born: Stephen Gray; October 26, 1962 (age 63); Cupertino, California, United States
- Occupations: Author, spiritual teacher
- Website: opengatesangha.org

Adyashanti (/ˌɑːdjəˈʃɑːnti/ AHD-yə-SHAHN-tee; Sanskrit आद्य शान्तिः meaning 'primordial peace'; born Stephen Gray on October 26, 1962) is an American former spiritual teacher and author from the San Francisco Bay Area who offered talks, online study courses, and retreats in the United States and abroad. He is the author of numerous books, CDs and DVDs and, together with his wife Mukti, is the founder of Open Gate Sangha, Inc., a nonprofit organization established in 1996 which supports and makes available his teachings.

== Life ==
In his 20s, Gray studied Zen Buddhism under the guidance of Arvis Joen Justi for fourteen years. Justi was a student of Taizan Maezumi Roshi of the Zen Center of Los Angeles. Gray also studied with Jakusho Kwong Roshi of the Sonoma Mountain Zen Center. At age 25, Gray began experiencing a series of transformative spiritual awakenings. While sitting alone on his cushion, Gray describes how he had a classic kensho, or awakening experience, in which he "penetrated to the emptiness of all things and realized that the Buddha I had been chasing was what I was." Besides his meditations and prayer, he also studied books about Christian mystics and the Gospels.

For the next few years he continued his meditation practice, while also working at his father's machine shop. In addition to sitting, he spent many hours in coffee shops writing answers to questions that spontaneously came to him. Finally, at 31, Gray had an experience of awakening that put to rest all his questions and doubts. In 1996, Adyashanti began teaching with the approval of his teacher, Arvis Joen Justi. He first started giving talks to small gatherings, in a room above his aunt's garage, which grew over years and he changed his name to Adyashanti, a Sanskrit term for 'primordial peace'. Adyashanti's talks focus on awakening and embodying awakening. "The Truth I point to is not confined within any religious point of view, belief system, or doctrine, but is open to all and found within all." He has authored the following books: The Direct Way, Sacred Inquiry, The Most Important Thing, Resurrecting Jesus, Falling into Grace, The Impact of Awakening, The End of Your World, Emptiness Dancing, True Meditation, My Secret Is Silence, and The Way of Liberation. Adyashanti's foundational teachings can be found in the book The Way of Liberation.

In April 2014, he appeared in an interview with Oprah Winfrey on a Super Soul Sunday episode.

As of 2023, he lives in the Eastern Sierras with his wife Mukti. He retired from active teaching as a spiritual teacher in October 2023 due to PTSD resulting from a very long period of intense physical pain.

== Open Gate Sangha ==
Sangha is a term used in several Sanskrit-derived languages of India to refer to a spiritual "assembly" or community, traditionally a monastic one, but its usage varies. Adyashanti founded Open Gate Sangha, Inc., in 1996 when he began teaching. This sangha refers to both the organization itself and his student community as a whole. The organization runs on a small staff, as well as many volunteers, and helps coordinate Adya's (as he is called by his students) teaching and travel schedule. It also produces audio, visual and written material for publication.

== Bibliography ==
- Adyashanti (2002). The Impact of Awakening: Excerpts from the Teachings of Adyashanti. Open Gate Sangha. ISBN 978-0-9717036-0-5.
- Adyashanti (2003). My Secret Is Silence: Poetry and Sayings of Adyashanti. Open Gate Sangha. ISBN 978-0-9717036-1-2.
- Adyashanti (2008). The End of Your World: Uncensored Straight Talk on the Nature of Enlightenment. Sounds True. ISBN 978-1-59179-963-4.
- Adyashanti (2009). Emptiness Dancing. Sounds True. ISBN 978-1591794592.
- Adyashanti (2010). True Meditation: Discover the Freedom of Pure Awareness. Sounds True. ISBN 978-1591794677.
- Adyashanti (2011). Falling into Grace: Insights on the End of Suffering. Sounds True. ISBN 978-1-60407-087-3.
- Adyashanti (2012). The Way of Liberation. Open Gate Sangha. ISBN 978-1-937195-17-5. Archived from the original on 2017-05-03.
- Adyashanti (2014). Resurrecting Jesus: Embodying the Spirit of a Revolutionary Mystic. Sounds True. ISBN 978-1-62203-094-1.
- Adyashanti (2019). The Most Important Thing: Discovering Truth at the Heart of Life. Sounds True. ISBN 978-1-68364-191-9.
- Adyashanti (2020). Sacred Inquiry: Questions That Can Transform Your Life. Open Gate Sangha. ISBN 978-1-950641-18-5.
- Adyashanti (2021). The Direct Way. Sounds True. ISBN 978-1-68364-614-3.
