= Religion Communicators Council =

The Religion Communicators Council is an American nonprofit organization representing marketing, communications and public relations officers from 60 different faith-based institutions in the United States. Founded in 1929 as the Religious Publicity Council, it changed its name to the National Religious Publicity Council in 1949, the Religious Public Relations Council in 1963, and became the Religion Communicators Council in 1998. It was originally focused on communications needs for Christian organizations, but in 1970 it expanded its membership to all religious faiths.

The organization has several branches across the U.S. It hosts an annual conference to discuss media strategies and issues. It also presents the Wilbur Awards, an annual tribute to mainstream media's coverage of faith-based issues.

== Awards ==
The Religious Communicators Council grants several awards.

=== Wilbur Awards ===
The Council has presented Wilbur Awards annually since 1949. They honor excellence by individuals in secular media – print and online journalism, book publishing, broadcasting, and motion pictures – in communicating religious issues, values and themes. Winners receive a stained-glass trophy. The award is named for Marvin C. Wilbur, a pioneer in religious public relations and longtime Council leader.

=== Derose-Hinkhouse Memorial Award ===
The RCC also honors members with the DeRose-Hinkhouse Memorial Awards, which are presented at the annual convention to active RCC members "who demonstrate excellence in religious communications and public relations."

The awards are named to honor the late Victor DeRose and the late Paul M. Hinkhouse, leading lithographers in New York City, and longtime friends of the RCC. Both men shared a strong interest in, and concern for, excellence in communications.

=== Struchen Award ===
RCC's newest award, the Struchen Award, is named for former long-time executive director Shirley Whipple Struchen. This award was created to "recognize an individual, organization, or project that has served to elevate religious communication and consciousness beyond boundaries of faith."
