= Mary M. Morrissey =

American author, screenwriter, actor and speaker

Mary Morrissey
- Born: 1949 (age 76–77); Beaverton, Oregon, United States
- Website: www.marymorrissey.com

Mary Manin Morrissey (born May 25, 1949) is an American New Thought leader, author and public speaker.

Morrissey founded the organization Living Enrichment Center, and was co-founder and president of the Association for Global New Thought. Known for her international nonviolence activism, she was instrumental in the creation of Season for Nonviolence in 1997 along with Arun Gandhi. She is the author of bestselling books Building Your Field of Dreams (1996) and No Less Than Greatness (2001).

== Early life ==
Morrissey (née Manin) was born in Beaverton, Oregon in 1949. At age 16 she fell in love with a college student and became pregnant, and the couple quickly married (due to the shame of teen pregnancy at the time, Morrissey was expelled from high school). Shortly after giving birth, she became seriously ill with a kidney infection, but later recovered, recounting a visit by a New Thought minister. She began studying the field of New Thought, which was then relatively novel. She earned a Master's Degree in Counseling Psychology and a Doctorate in Humane Letters.

== Career ==
=== Humanitarian work ===
Morrissey became a teacher, and in 1975 an ordained minister. She began lecturing on the subjects of New Thought, spiritual growth, and non-violence, becoming a noted activist for the New Thought movement and helping to found spiritual centers across the United States.

An active feminist in the American Second-wave feminism of the 1970s, Morrissey joined hands with Barbara Marx Hubbard and Jean Houston to found The Society for the Universal Human. She was later invited to become a member of the Transformational Leadership Council, founded by Jack Canfield.

Morrissey worked with the Dalai Lama on issues relating to the global nonviolence movement. She co-founded the Association for Global New Thought in 1995 and was its first president. During her humanitarian work, she met Nelson Mandela in South Africa, and later incorporated his teachings of nonviolent resistance into her work.

As an activist for international nonviolence, she helped Arun Gandhi (Mahatma Gandhi's grandson) create Season for Nonviolence, whose curriculums have been taught in schools and universities over the years. As part of her work there, she was invited to address the United Nations, first on curbing violence, and later on the need for an international nonviolence agenda.

=== Living Enrichment Center ===
Morrissey founded along with her then-husband the Living Enrichment Center, a New Thought church based in Oregon.

In 2004 the couple were part of a financial scandal, which ended in a settlement with the federal government and repayments of over $10 million. Later on, Morrissey and her husband divorced, and she apologized for leading supporters to such "financial road".

=== Writings ===
Building Your Field of Dreams (1996). Morrissey's book chronicles her struggles as a teenage mother and lays out her self-actualization process. The book became popular among the self-development and New Thought community.

No Less Than Greatness (2001). In her book No Less Than Greatness: Finding Perfect Love in Imperfect Relationships, Morrissey focused on relationship building. Relationships were often at the core of Morrissey's teachings and articles, speaking of the tension between masculinity and femininity, often from a spiritual perspective. The book was taught internationally and was recommended by authors such as Gary Zukav, Marianne Williamson, and Neale Donald Walsch.

New Thought: A Practical Spirituality: Published by Penguin Group in 2002, the book aimed to present the New Thought movement in a more cohesive nature. Morrissey incorporated into her teachings sources from the Bible and the Talmud, as well as from A Course In Miracles, the Tao Te Ching, and others. The book offers brief essays from over 40 New Thought leaders. It became a resource for academic research and was recognized by Jones & Bartlett Learning and Oxford University Press as a source to deepen one's understanding of the New Thought movement.

Others: Furthermore, Morrissey was a contributing author in Katherine Martin's 2010 book Women of Spirit, in Helene Lerner's 2012 book In Her Power, and Christy Whitman's 2018 book Quantum Success. Over the years, Morrissey's work has been referenced by many self-help, empowerment, and spirituality publications, Christian teachings books, and Simon & Schuster's Chicken Soup for the Soul series (which opened chapters with her teachings). Morrissey is credited for inspiring the writing of several books and in several languages; according to Alan Cohen, her versatile writing made her "one of the most respected ministers in the New Thought movement".

=== Media ===
Morrissey's work appearances on television include PBS Building Dreams specials, which was adapted from her book Building Your Field of Dreams, Her television program aired on NBC-affiliated stations, and later on streaming service Gaia. Along with Bob Proctor, she released the audio program The Eleven Forgotten Laws.

Morrissey was an early proponent of spiritual cinema, and over the years appeared in several documentaries in the field, including Eckhart Tolle's Living Luminaries (2007), Beyond the Secret (2009) alongside Les Brown, Discover the Gift (2010) alongside Dalai Lama, The Inner Weigh (2010), and Sacred Journey of the Heart (2014); in 2016 she gave a TEDx talk,The Hidden Code For Transforming Dreams Into Reality.
