= Compassion in Action =

Compassion In Action
- Directed by: Khashyar Darvish
- Produced by: Khashyar Darvich
- Starring: 14th Dalai Lama
- Edited by: Ryan Charles
- Production company: Wakan Films
- Release date: 2014
- Country: United States

Compassion in Action (aka Dalai Lama's Compassion In Action) is a documentary film produced and directed by Khashyar Darvich. Released in 2014, the film is a deeper exploration of the ideas presented in the award-winning Dalai Lama Awakening. Compassion In Action is the final inspiring journey with the Dalai Lama and the "renaissance" thinkers featured in the award-winning Dalai Lama Renaissance and Dalai Lama Awakening films.

The film features innovative thinkers such as Dr. Michael Beckwith (The Secret), quantum physicist Fred Alan Wolf, radio host and author Thom Hartmann, revolutionary social scientist Jean Houston and others.

The film was 2nd billing to Dalai Lama Awakening during a successful 36-city double-feature tour in the U.K. and played to sold-out audiences during a 100-city double-feature tour of the U.S. and Canada.
