= Dalai Lama Renaissance =

2007 American documentary film

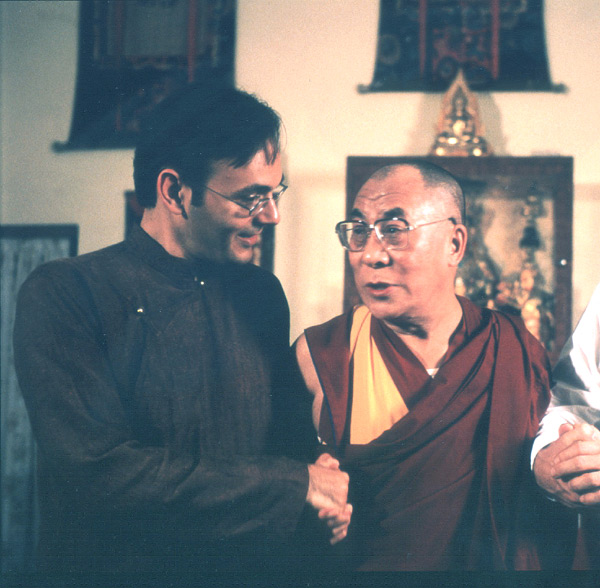
- Producer-Director Khashyar Darvich with the Dalai Lama in India during filming of the documentary.
- Directed by: Khashyar Darvich
- Produced by: Khashyar Darvich
- Narrated by: Harrison Ford
- Release date: 2007
- Running time: 81 minutes
- Country: United States

Dalai Lama Renaissance is a 2007 documentary film, produced and directed by Khashyar Darvich, and narrated by actor Harrison Ford. The film documents the Dalai Lama's meeting with the self-titled "Synthesis" group, made up of 40 Western "renaissance" thinkers who hope to use the meeting to change the world and resolve many of the world's problems. The meeting took place at the Dalai Lama's home in Dharamsala, India in September, 1999.

== Background ==
Among the Western thinkers who met the Dalai Lama are: quantum physicist Fred Alan Wolf, social scientist Jean Houston, and founder of Agape International Spiritual Center church in Los Angeles, Dr. Michael Beckwith.

== Release ==
It was also released in theaters in Taiwan in June 2009. The film received positive front page Chinese language press in Taiwan. However, The People's Daily presented an article criticizing the film.

In 2014 Wakan Films released the Poetic ReVision and Director's Cut of Dalai Lama Renaissance. Entitled Dalai Lama Awakening the film contains over 30 minutes of additional footage and a completely new score.

== Music ==
The film includes original music by Tibetan musicians.

== Accolades ==
The film won 12 awards, was the official selection in over 40 international film festivals, and played in cinemas in over 100 cities in the U.S., as well as other countries in the world like Germany, Austria, Switzerland.
