= Living Enrichment Center =

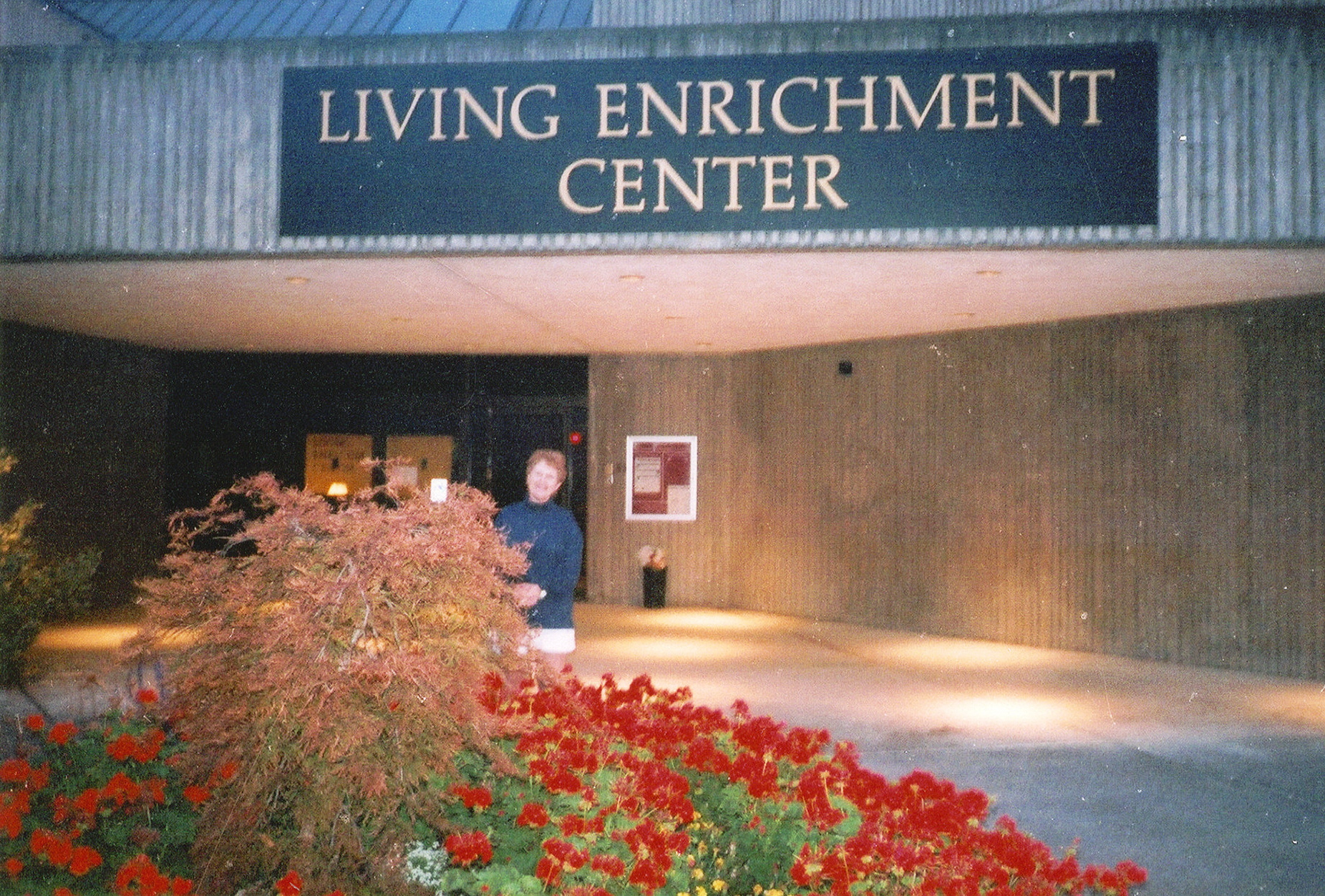
- Living Enrichment Center entrance, Wilsonville
- Living Enrichment Center
- 45.3048°N 122.8037°W
- Location: Scholls, Tigard, Wilsonville, and Beaverton, Oregon
- Country: United States
- Denomination: New Thought

History
- Founded: 1970s
- Founder(s): Mary Manin Boggs (Morrissey), and Haven Boggs

Architecture
- Closed: 2004

Living Enrichment Center (LEC) was a New Thought organization and retreat center in the U.S. state of Oregon. It was founded in the farmhouse of senior minister Mary M. Morrissey of Scholls, Oregon, in the mid-1970s; the church moved to a 94,500 square foot (8,800 m²) building on a forested area of 95 acres (384,000 m²) in Wilsonville in 1992. Over the course of its existence, the congregation grew from less than a dozen to an estimated 4,000, making it the biggest New Thought church in the state. Living Enrichment Center maintained an in-house bookstore, retreat center, café, kindergarten and elementary school, and an outreach television ministry.

Living Enrichment Center closed in 2004 as a result of a $10.7 million financial scandal. Edward Morrissey pleaded guilty to money laundering and using church money for the personal expenses of himself and his wife. He was sentenced to two years in federal prison. He was released in early 2007. Living Enrichment Center dissolved in 2004, from which several ministries emerged including New Thought Center for Spiritual Living, Celebration Church and Whole Life Center in Lake Oswego.

== Founding ==
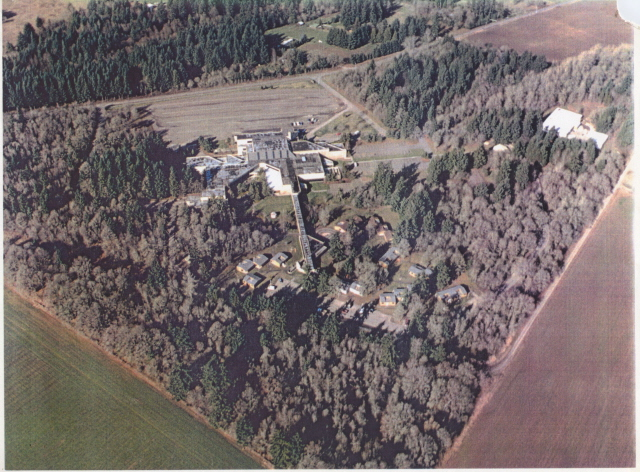
Aerial view of Living Enrichment Center's facilities and grounds in Wilsonville

The origins of the Living Enrichment Center were in a church called The Truth Center that Mary Manin Morrissey and her first husband, Rev. Haven Boggs, started in the living room of their small farm in rural Oregon in 1974. The church was not successful, and in 1979 Morrissey and her husband took the family and their ministry on the road, offering workshops on building self-esteem in churches around the country. After a year on the road, Mary and Haven founded a church in the Odd Fellows Hall in Beaverton, Oregon, after they felt they had received divine guidance to start a ministry. A church management consultant advised them to name the church after what they aimed to do; as they aimed to enrich people's lives, they called themselves the Living Enrichment Center.

In November 1992, Living Enrichment Center acquired the former Callahan Center, in Wilsonville, which consisted of a three-level 94,000-square-foot (8,700 m^{2}) building on a 93-acre (380,000 m^{2}) lot. The lot also included 13 cabins, with over 70 rooms, which were used for spiritual retreats conducted via the church's sister organization, Namaste Retreat Center. By 1997 the church were engaged in a campaign via a Portland Sunday TV message, advertising, and outreach programs, to grow the local congregation by an extra 200 members.

== Facilities ==
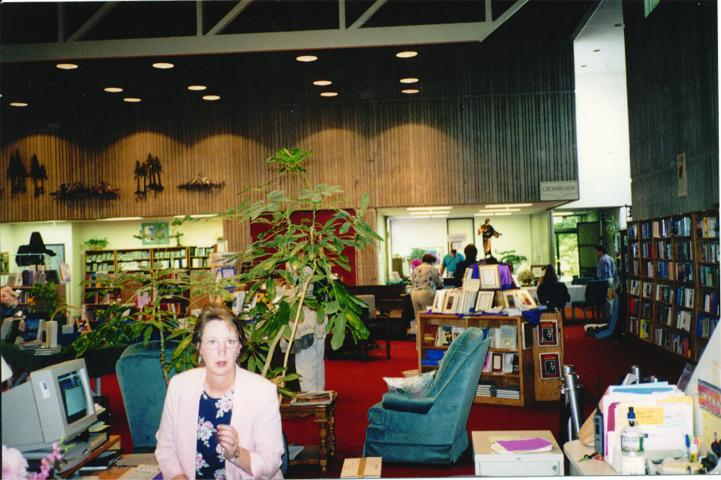
Inside the Wilsonville campus

LEC maintained an in-house bookstore, retreat center, cafe, an outreach television ministry, and an educational institution called the Cristofori School which taught children from kindergarten through third grade.

Taking its name from the sanskrit word namaste, the Namaste Retreat and Conference Center billed itself as, "Oregon's leading spiritual retreat center." Many personalities within the New Age and New Thought communities conducted retreats at Namaste, including Marianne Williamson, Wayne Dyer, Deepak Chopra, Jean Houston, Barbara Marx Hubbard, Shakti Gawain, Stanislav Grof, and Arun Gandhi.

== Life Keys programs ==
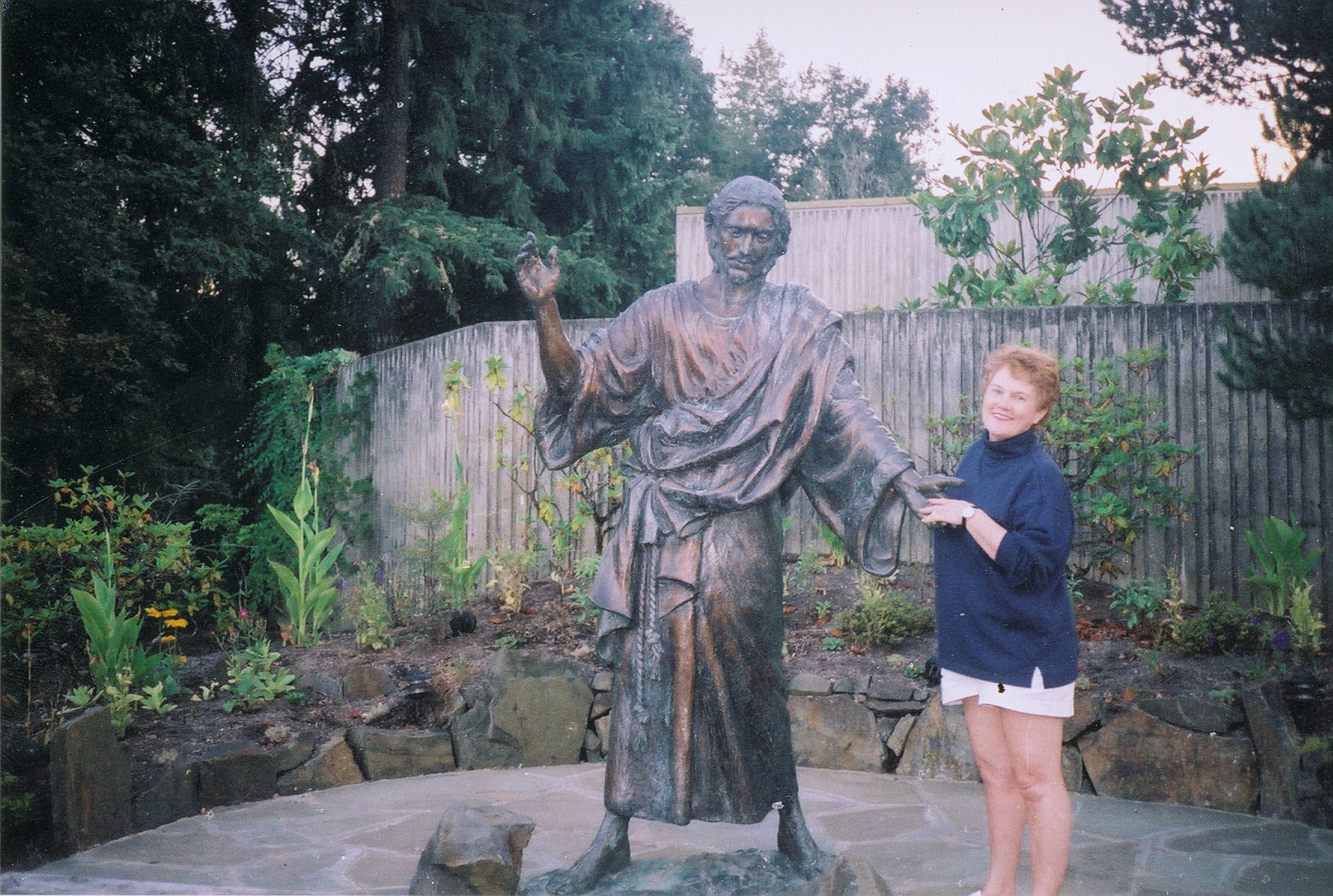
Living Enrichment Center had many statues, including "The Welcoming Jesus" by sculptor Lorenzo Ghiglieri.

In April 1997, LEC launched Life Keys, a weekly taped television show hosted by Morrissey that was syndicated across several states including Washington, California, Arizona, and Texas, mainly on public access stations. The LEC also produced audiotapes, CDs, and video cassettes of Morrissey's Sunday talks, which were available for purchase through LEC's bookstore. Often, audio cassettes of a Sunday service were available immediately after service. The audio tapes were also available via a mail subscription. Though most of the talks on Life Keys were delivered by Morrissey, some were recordings of talks given by visiting speakers such as Gandhi, Williamson, and Dyer.

Life Keys was discontinued in 2004 when LEC filed for bankruptcy and closed. Morrissey's last talk distributed in the Life Keys series was entitled "The Right Questions to Ask" and was recorded on August 1, 2004. It was also her last talk as senior minister of LEC. In this last talk, Morrissey said her life was in "disarray", that her husband is in a mental hospital for depression and that she herself needed to take a break.

== Financial scandal ==
In early 2004, Morrissey was sued by members of LEC for unpaid loans. It was reported that the loans were often made personally to Morrissey, and that the personal finances of herself, her husband Edward, and LEC had not been treated separately. In an e-mail to Willamette Week, Steve Unger, Morrissey's attorney, wrote that the Morrisseys had committed commingling, and that "the finances of [the] LEC, New Thought Broadcasting, Mary Morrissey and Ed Morrissey were treated not separately, but as a kind of 'financial family.'" By the summer of 2004, the sum total of LEC's debt was reported by Willamette Week and The Oregonian as totaling more than $20 million. Throughout the month of June, Mary Morrissey and Harry Morgan Moses conducted a series of talks called "Standing Firm While Your World is Shaking", for a "love offering" of $15 per class or $100 for the series. On July 14, 2004, LEC held "Calling Forth a Miracle: A Benefit for Living Enrichment Center with Very Special Guests" and declared 2004–2005 as "The Year of the Miracle".

On April 6, 2005, it was reported that a settlement deal between the Morrisseys and Oregon's Department of Consumer and Business Services had been reached: "As part of this settlement, neither of the Morrisseys may offer or sell securities. Further, Edward Morrissey agreed to plead guilty to a single federal count of money laundering. The plea agreement reached between Edward Morrissey and the U.S. Attorney's Office calls for the government to recommend a 36-month sentence, but that recommendation is not binding on the court." On April 17, Edward Morrissey pleaded guilty, admitting in federal court that he has defrauded members of LEC in soliciting $10.7 million in loans. The fact that Mary Morrissey wasn't charged, despite also pressuring LEC members to make the loans, angered some of the plaintiffs. Mary Morrissey agreed to contribute a portion of her disposable income to refunding former members of LEC. In the August 28, 2006, edition of the Wilsonville Spokesman, editor Curt Kipp wrote that she had repaid $24,000 of LEC's debt.

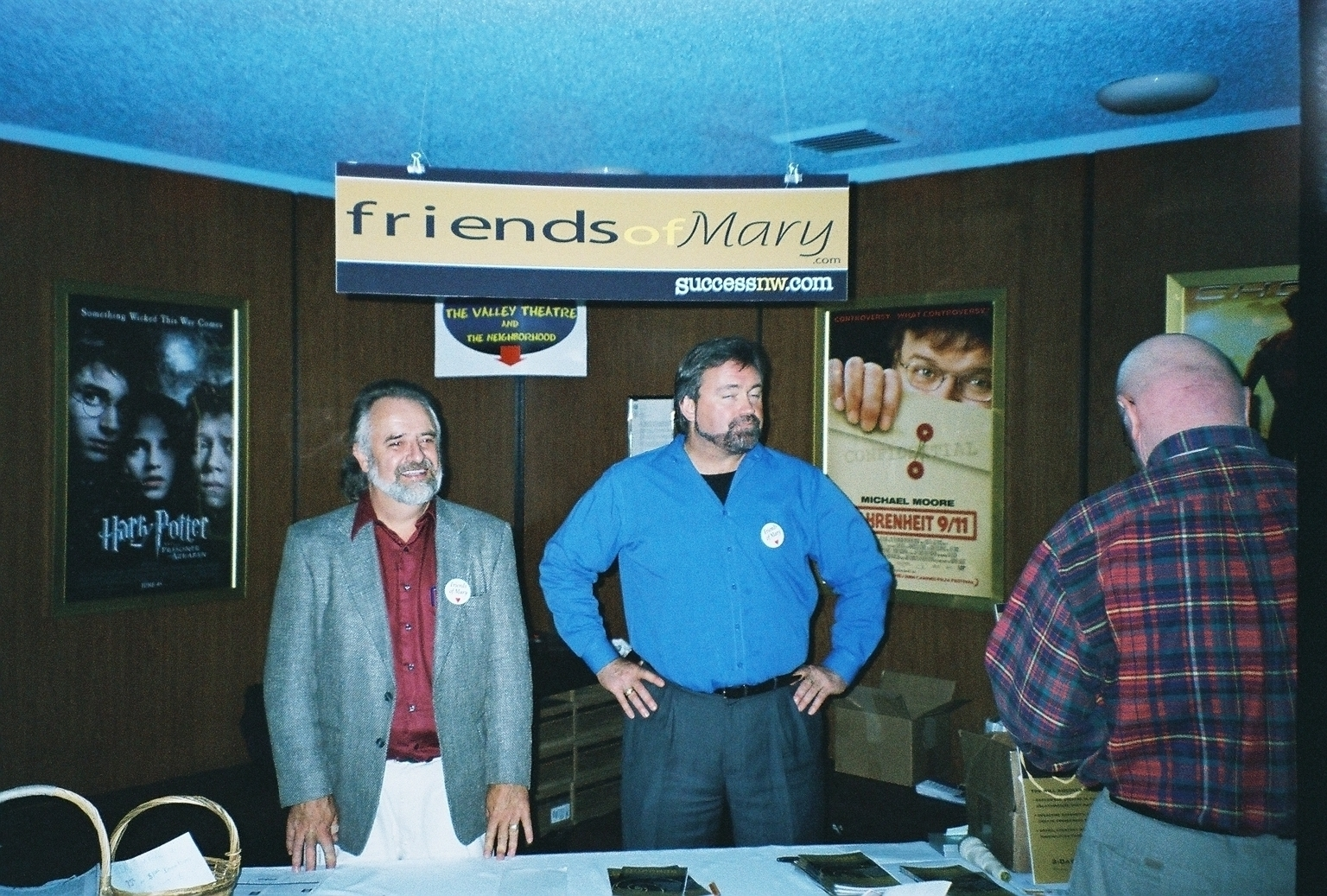
"Friends of Mary" advertises in the lobby at LEC's final service

After a year in prison at Terminal Island, in August 2006, Edward Morrissey was transferred to a halfway house in Seattle. He was released from the halfway house on February 2, 2007.

In a letter to Willamette Week in 2004, the lawyer for Mary Morrissey's then-husband, Edward Morrissey, admitted that the couple had committed commingling. Mary Manin Morrissey's second ex-husband, Edward Morrissey, pleaded guilty to money laundering and using church money for the personal expenses of himself and his wife, and spent time in federal prison. The Seattle Times reports that the Morrisseys committed "financial improprieties" and that some former members of Living Enrichment Center were upset with the deal the Morrisseys struck with federal prosecutors. Former congregant John Trudel of Newberg, Oregon, is reported to have loaned the church $100,000 between 2000 and 2002. Trudel is quoted as saying that church money was being diverted. Willamette Week wrote that Steve Unger, lawyer for the Morrisseys, admitted that the couple had committed commingling. The Oregonian writes that Mary Morrissey signed a consent agreement with state securities regulators, agreeing to repay $10.7 million to her former congregation, but she is in default and that at the rate Mary Morrissey is making repayment it will take her 300 years to repay congregation debt in full. KATU writes that the debt may never be repaid. Wilsonville Spokesman has reported that the amount of money Mary Morrissey has repaid would amount to less than half a penny per dollar of debt.

KATU reported that Edward Morrissey agreed to plead guilty to money laundering on the condition that Mary Manin Morrissey not be charged with a crime. The Oregonian wrote in 2009 that Mary Morrissey signed a consent agreement agreeing to repay the debt, but that she is in default of the consent agreement.

== Closure ==
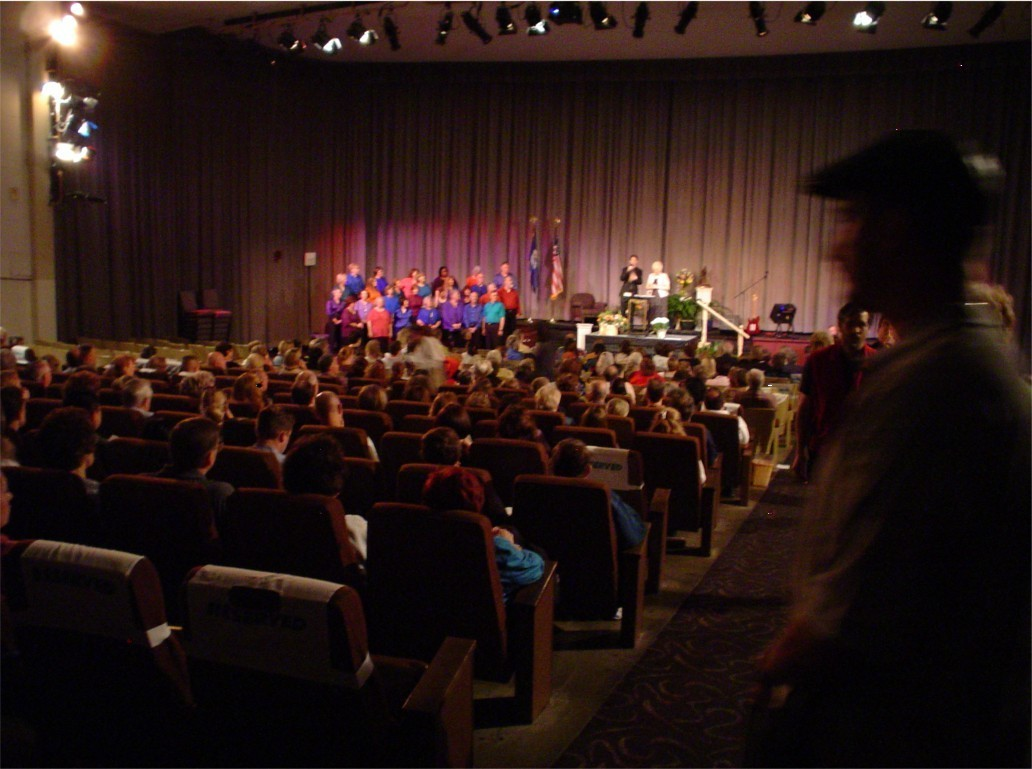
Audience for the church's final service, August 24, 2004, Valley Theatre in Beaverton

Living Enrichment Center abandoned the Wilsonville facilities in June 2004. The church moved to Valley Theatre, a movie theater in Beaverton. The first service at Valley Theatre was held on July 4, 2004. On August 5, 2004, in an e-mail to her congregation, Morrissey announced her resignation as Senior Minister, President, and Board Member of Living Enrichment Center. The final service was held on August 29, 2004, at Valley Theatre.

Three separate ministries grew out of the demise of Living Enrichment Center. Friends of Mary, an organization established by Mary Morrissey, eventually evolved into Life Soulutions. Several other former LEC ministers established New Thought Ministries of Oregon. Barry Dennis, a former LEC musician, established "Celebration Church".

In 2013, Josh Kulla of the Wilsonville Spokesman wrote that the building that stood on the Living Enrichment Center site had been demolished and the plot of land was slated to be developed as part of the future expansion of the Villebois housing development.

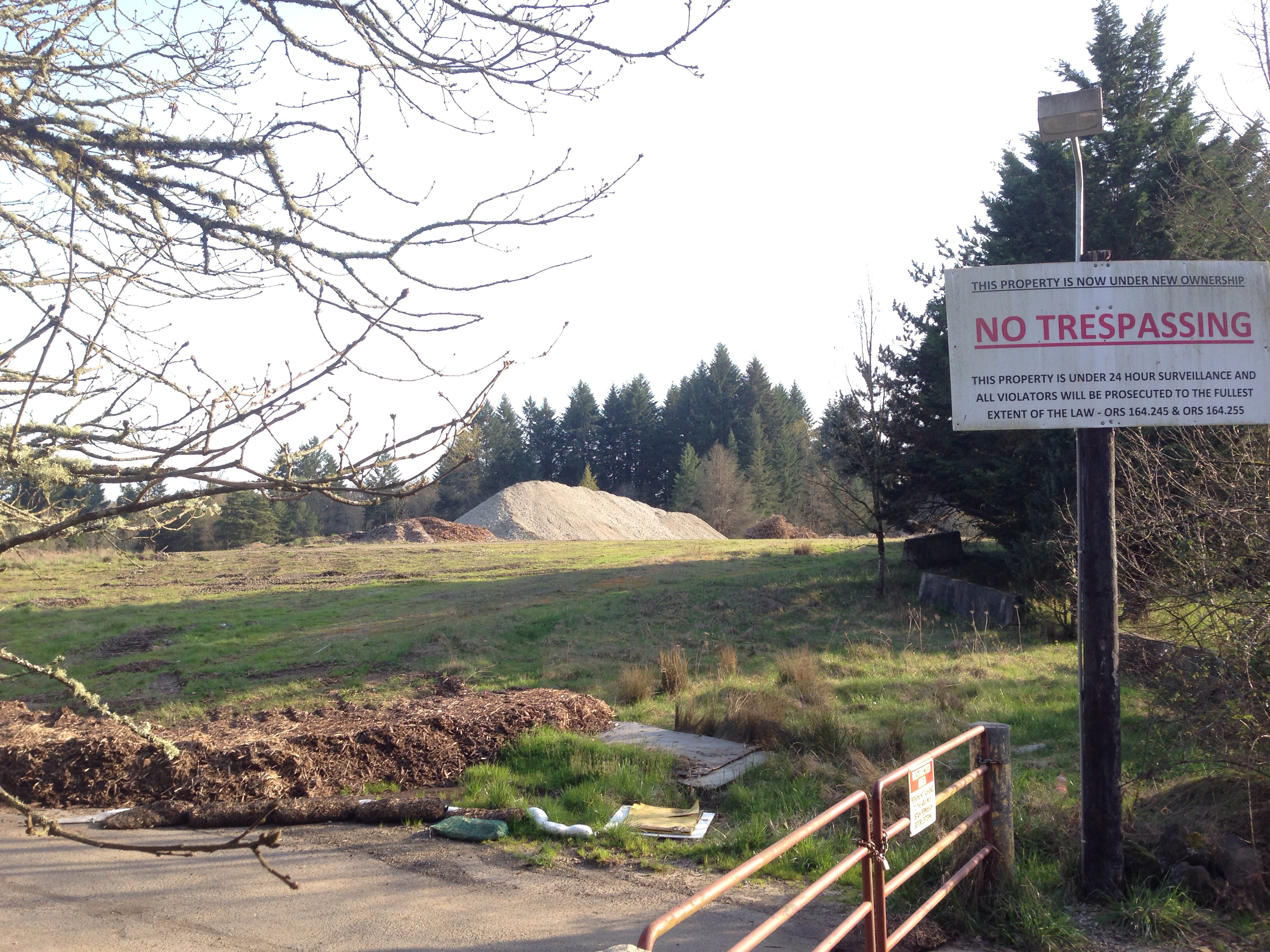
Former Living Enrichment Center plot of land after the main building had been demolished

== The Morrisseys ==
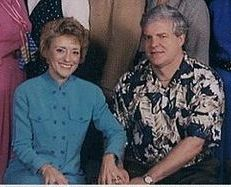
Edward Morrissey and Mary Manin Morrissey during their tenure at Living Enrichment Center

Mary Manin Boggs Morrissey Dickey was the founder (along with her then-husband Haven Boggs) and senior minister of Living Enrichment Center. Edward Morrissey married Mary Manin Boggs (thereafter known as Mary Manin Morrissey) in the mid-1990s, and shortly after the marriage Edward Morrissey became the CFO of the church. In the October 16, 2006, Oregonian article "Forgiveness, for minister, starts with self", staff writer S. Renee Mitchell indicated that Mary Morrissey and Ed Morrissey have divorced. Mitchell wrote, "When the smoke cleared, Morrissey — who had once cozied up to the Dalai Lama and other world spiritual leaders — was divorced, houseless and in debt for more than $10 million."

After a year in prison at Terminal Island, in August 2006, Edward Morrissey was transferred to a halfway house in Portland, Oregon. He was released from there on February 2, 2007. Both Mary Manin Morrissey and Edward Morrissey have injunctions against them, prohibiting them from heading or being agents in nonprofit organizations. Both are also prohibited from selling securities.

Mary Morrissey is the author of Building Your Field of Dreams which chronicles Morrissey's realization of her dream to create a ministry, and No Less Than Greatness, The Seven Spiritual Principles that Make Love Possible Mary Manin Morrissey also appears in The Moses Code. Mary Morrissey has also authored several audio programs, including the popular co-produced audio, The Eleven Forgotten Laws with Bob Proctor. Morrissey appeared in the movie The Inner Weigh, written and directed by Dave Smiley. The movie is about tapping into the power of one's subconscious mind to create the body and the life that one wants.

Mary Manin Morrissey also operated two companies, "Life Soulutions" and "Evolving Life Ministries". The Oregonian reported in 2007, that the organization of Life Soulutions has prompted questions from the state of Oregon because Morrissey's partner, Karen Hanzlik, in the venture receives as much as 40% of revenue, meaning that this portion is not required to be diverted to the restitution fund. "State officials have asked Morrissey for documents detailing the corporate structure of LifeSoulutions," writes The Oregonian. "Morrissey told them that on the advice of an attorney, there are no such documents. Nothing was put in writing. 'We're researching the law and considering our legal options,' Whang said. 'But it is a very unusual situation.'" KATU, Portland's ABC affiliate, reports that because Mary Morrissey was permanently prohibited from holding the position of Officer, Financial Manager or Financial Fiduciary for any charitable or religious non-profit entity, her current companies, Life Soulutions, Evolving Life Ministries, and her church in Lake Oswego, Oregon, are operated as for-profit entities. KATU also reports that in an interview Morrissey was evasive about her finances, but the news team tracked online donations to Morrissey's business, discovering they make their way to a Portland mail box controlled by Morrissey. Investigators from the state of Oregon want to make sure that Morrissey is not diverting money from her income, as a stipulation of her plea bargain with the state was that a portion of her income must be used to repay her debt to her former congregation. KATU reported in 2007, that Morrissey has repaid only $74,000 since her plea bargain was struck in 2005.
