= Renaissance Unity Interfaith Spiritual Fellowship =

Church in Michigan, United States

Renaissance Unity Interfaith Spiritual Fellowship, also known as Church of Today, is a New Thought "megachurch" in Warren, Michigan with a congregation often estimated in excess of 2,000. Best selling author Marianne Williamson served as minister of Renaissance Unity Interfaith Spiritual Fellowship for five years and caused controversy within the church when in 2002 she sought to dissolve the church's formal affiliation with Association of Unity Churches. Williamson resigned as a result of the controversy. The church was founded by Jack Boland.

== See also ==
- Living Enrichment Center
