= Dalai Lama Awakening =

2014 documentary film

- Film poster
- Directed by: Khashyar Darvich
- Produced by: Khashyar Darvich
- Starring: Dalai Lama
- Narrated by: Harrison Ford
- Music by: Drew Scnurr
- Production company: Wakan Films
- Release date: March 2, 2014

Dalai Lama Awakening is a 2014 feature-length documentary film, produced and directed by Khashyar Darvich and narrated by actor Harrison Ford. With over 30 minutes of additional footage and a new score, the film is a Director's Cut and revision of Dalai Lama Renaissance, the award-winning 2007 documentary. The film presents the journey of innovative Western thinkers who travel to India to meet with the Dalai Lama.

The film features Dr. Michael Beckwith (The Secret), quantum physicists Fred Alan Wolf and Amit Goswami (What The Bleep Do We Know), radio host and author Thom Hartmann, author Vicki Robin, philosopher Vandana Shiva, biologist Elisabet Sahtouris, social scientist Jean Houston, and others.

The film opened in the U.K. in 2014 and played to sold-out audiences during its 2015 tour of the U.S. and Canada.
