= Return to Love =

Return to Love may refer to

- A Return to Love, 1992 book by author Marianne Williamson
- Return to Love Tour 2000 concert tour by American singing group Diana Ross and the Supremes
- Return to Love, album by Nana Mouskouri
