= ACIM =

ACIM may refer to:

- A Course in Miracles, a spiritual book by Helen Schucman
- An AC induction motor
- Associate Member of the Chartered Institute of Marketing
