= Khashyar Darvich =

American film producer

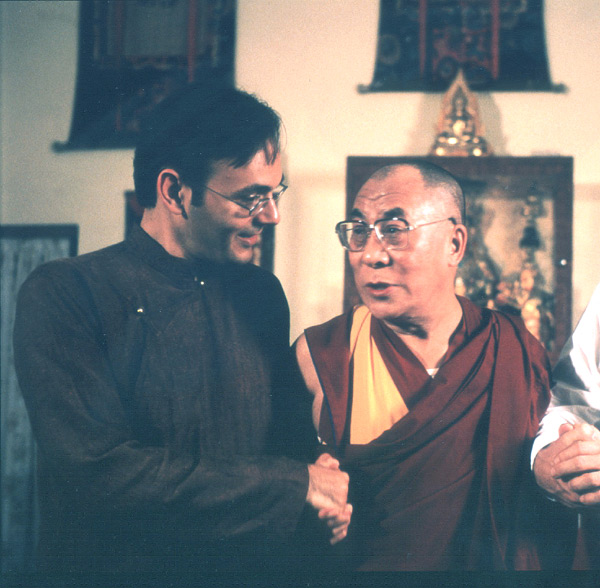
Producer-Director Khashyar Darvich with the Dalai Lama in India during filming of the "Dalai Lama Renaissance" documentary.

Khashyar Darvich is a documentary film producer and director best known for directing a documentary film about the Dalai Lama entitled Dalai Lama Renaissance, narrated by actor Harrison Ford.

== Career ==
He got his start in Colorado where he produced other documentaries and broadcast programs, including the documentary about an eccentric Colorado mountain town entitled "Black Hawk Waltz: Tales of a Rocky Mountain Town," which was broadcast on the History Channel.

In 2007 he released Dalai Lama Renaissance, which was an official selection at over 35 film festivals and won 12 awards. He then followed it up with A Revolution Of Ideas, a companion piece to his Dalai Lama documentary.

In 2014 Darvich's Wakan Films released the final two films in his Dalai Lama series: Dalai Lama Awakening, a poetic re-visioning and extended cut of his first award winning film and Compassion In Action, both of which have already had extensive tours in the UK and Scotland.

Darvich is currently in post-production on a number of other documentaries including The Silence Of Happiness, an inspirational film about deaf children in Sri Lanka called The Matrix Of Compassion, a story of intertwining lives spanning 50 years and multiple continents; and an as yet Untitled Project about the Peace Pilgrim, an American woman who walked over 50,000 miles for peace during the latter part of the 20th century.

He graduated from Miami University in Oxford, Ohio and currently resides in Los Angeles, California.
