= A Return to Love =

1992 book by Marianne Williamson

- Paperback 1993
- Author: Marianne Williamson
- Language: English
- Genre: Self-help
- Publisher: HarperCollins
- Publication date: 1992
- Pages: 336
- ISBN: 0-06-092748-8
- OCLC: 317503896
- Dewey Decimal: 299/.93 20
- LC Class: BP605.C68 W56 1996

A Return to Love: Reflections on the Principles of a Course in Miracles (1992) is the first book by Marianne Williamson, and concerns the 1976 book A Course in Miracles by Helen Schucman. A Return to Love was a New York Times best seller.

== Contents ==
The book contains Williamson's reflections on the book A Course in Miracles and her thoughts on finding inner peace through love. Amazon.com describes its theme as "how we each can become a miracle worker by accepting God and by the expression of love in our daily lives."

The book is divided into two main parts, Principles and Practice. The Principles section has chapters entitled "Hell", "God", "You", "Surrender", and "Miracles". The Practice section has chapters "Relationships", "Body", "Work", and "Heaven".

In each chapter, Williamson defines certain concepts. For example, she defines "darkness" as internalized fear. Williamson also provides personal experiences and anecdotes to further explain the concepts. Strong Christian references are woven throughout the book.

The book is written with the understanding that the reader would have a working knowledge of religious concepts. Some of Williamson's explanations are not mainstream Christian theological views. For example, in chapter 3 ("You"), section 2 ("The divine mind"), when referring to Christ, she writes, "The word 'Christ' is a psychological term. No religion has a monopoly on the truth. Christ refers to the common thread of divine love that is the core and essence of every human mind."

== Reception ==
=== Praise ===
Reviews of the book were generally favorable.

A Return to Love spent 39 weeks on The New York Times best-seller list in 1992 and was number one on the Publishers Weekly nonfiction best-seller list for 11 weeks. It was credited as having been written by one of the two authors who helped bring New Age perspectives to the American mainstream, the other being Thomas Moore.

Williamson promoted the book, as well as A Course in Miracles, when she appeared on the Oprah Winfrey Show, an episode that received more pro viewer mail than any other show for 1992. She also spoke of the book, and The Course, when she was interviewed by Barbara Walters on the ABC television show 20/20. In July 2012, about 20 years after the book was published, Williamson was interviewed by Oprah Winfrey on a Super Soul Sunday (OWN TV) episode titled, "20 Years After 'A Return to Love'".

=== Criticism ===
The book has also been labeled by critics as having paranormal and antiscience philosophy in regard to health issues. Williamson has rebuffed such framing, though, saying: "This entire idea of me as antimedicine and antiscience could not be further from the truth."

Chapter 8 of the book, titled "Body", is the most criticized. In it, Williamson states:

- "A friend of mine told me that we're not punished for our sins, but by our sins. Sickness is not a sign of God’s judgment on us, but of our judgment on ourselves. If we were to think that God created our sickness, how could we turn to Him for healing? As we’ve already established, God is all that is good. He creates only love, therefore he did not create sickness. Sickness is an illusion and does not actually exist. It is part of our worldly dream, our self-created nightmare. Our prayer to God is that He awaken us from the dream."
- "Healing results from transformed perception of our relationships to illness, one in which we respond to the problem with love instead of fear. When a child presents a cut finger to his or her mother, the woman doesn’t say, 'Bad cut'. Rather, she kisses the finger, showers it with love in an unconscious, instinctive activation of the healing process. Why should we think differently about critical illness? Cancer and AIDS and other serious illnesses are physical manifestations of a psychic scream and their message is not 'hate me', but 'Love me.'"
- "In the traditional Western medical model, a healer’s job is to attack disease. But if the consciousness of attack is the ultimate problem, how could it be the ultimate answer? A miracle worker’s job is not to attack illness, but rather to stimulate the natural forces of healing. We turn our eyes away from sickness to the love that lies beyond it. No sickness can diminish our capacity to love. Does that mean that it is a mistake to take medicine? Absolutely not."
- "When the cure for AIDS is finally found, we will give prizes to a few scientists, but many of us will know that millions and millions of prayers helped it happen."

=== Reviews ===
Bob Carroll, of The Skeptic's Dictionary, wrote: "Williamson might be called Oprah's patron saint. She's all about love and healing, yin and yang, being wounded, and using love and prayer to heal all wounds."

Writing in Commentary, John Podhoretz described A Return to Love as "almost unspeakably tasteless" in its blithe misappropriation of concepts central to the world's major religions...[it is] a work of surpassing vulgarity in a surpassingly vulgar field [that, nevertheless] offers both sound and surprisingly moving advice." Readers are advised to seek meaning in something larger than themselves, to get over the issues of their past, and "to act on wisdom from your grandmother, expressed in sugarcoated cliches: Always look on the bright side. If God gives you lemons, make lemonade."

== Quotations ==
Notable quotations from the book include:

- "...a miracle is a reasonable thing to ask for."
- "A person acting from a motivation of contribution and service rises to such a level of moral authority that worldly success is a natural result."

=== "Our deepest fear" ===
One particular passage from the book has become popular as an inspirational quotation:

Our deepest fear is not that we are inadequate. Our deepest fear is that we are powerful beyond measure. It is our light, not our darkness, that most frightens us. We ask ourselves, who am I to be brilliant, gorgeous, talented, fabulous? Actually, who are you not to be? You are a child of God. Your playing small doesn't serve the world. There's nothing enlightened about shrinking so that other people won't feel insecure around you. We are all meant to shine, as children do. We were born to make manifest the glory of God that is within us. It's not just in some of us; it's in everyone. And as we let our own light shine, we unconsciously give other people permission to do the same. As we're liberated from our own fear, our presence automatically liberates others.

The passage was paraphrased in the 2005 film, Coach Carter, and in the 2006 film Akeelah and the Bee. It has also been popularized because it has mistakenly been attributed to Nelson Mandela since 1996.

Williamson herself is quoted as saying, "As honored as I would be had President Mandela quoted my words, indeed he did not. I have no idea where that story came from, but I am gratified that the paragraph has come to mean so much to so many people."

The passage has been compared to a statement of Jesus of Nazareth found in Matthew 5:16, "let your light shine before others, that they may see your good deeds and glorify your Father in heaven."
