= Association for Global New Thought =

The Association for Global New Thought (AGNT) is an organization of ministers, lay people, heads of other New Thought organizations, and people of all faiths dedicated to "conscious co-creation". Its New Thought member churches and centers number between 600 and 700, and include Unity churches, Religious Science, Divine Science centers, and nondenominational New Thought spiritual communities.

== History ==
The Association for Global New Thought was formed after, "a leadership struggle in 1996 resulted in a number of influential leaders leaving INTA (International New Thought Alliance) to form the Association for Global New Thought." Mary M. Morrissey was the Association's co-founder and its first president alongside Michael Beckwith.

== Activities ==
Programs of the AGNT include the Season for Nonviolence; the Synthesis Dialogues with His Holiness, the Dalai Lama; the Awaked World Annual Conference; and New Thought Broadcasting.
