= Season for Nonviolence =

Yearly event celebrating Gandhi and Martin Luther King Jr.

The Season for Nonviolence was established in 1998 by Arun Gandhi, Mohandas Gandhi's grandson, as a yearly event celebrating the philosophies and lives of Mohandas Gandhi and Martin Luther King Jr. The idea was developed with the help of Dr. Michael Beckwith and Dr. Mary Morrissey, of the Association for Global New Thought and The Parliament of The World's Religions. Before his 2023 death Arun Gandhi co-chaired the Season along with Rev. Beckwith of the Agape International Spiritual Center.

The "season" begins with the anniversary of the assassination of Mahatma Gandhi on 30 January, ending on the 4 April anniversary of the assassination of Martin Luther King Jr. It is anchored by a mission, statement of principles, and commitments by participants towards living in a nonviolent way.
