= William Thetford =

American psychologist, professor, and editor (1923–1988)

- Born: April 25, 1923; Chicago, Illinois, US
- Died: July 4, 1988 (aged 65); Tiburon, California, US

William Thetford (April 25, 1923 – July 4, 1988) was an American psychologist, medical psychologist and professor. He is best known for his collaboration with Helen Schucman in typing the original manuscript and being on the editing team for A Course in Miracles (ACIM), a self-study curriculum in spiritual psychology. He died in 1988, aged 65, in Tiburon, California, after having made his involvement with the ACIM material and its study the central focus of his life.

== Early childhood ==
Thetford was born on April 25, 1923, in Chicago, Illinois to John and Mabel Thetford as the youngest of three children. At the time of his birth and early childhood, his parents were regular members of the Christian Science church. When he was seven, the untimely death of his older sister caused his parents to disavow their affiliation with the Church of Christian Science. For the next few years, the Thetfords sampled other Protestant denominations.

At the age of nine he contracted a severe case of scarlet fever, which led to rheumatic fever and a debilitating heart condition. These health problems forced him to spend the next three years at home recuperating. During his recuperation he took advantage of the many available hours to satisfy his voracious appetite for reading. Despite his absence from the classroom, he entered high school at the age of twelve.

== University education ==
Following graduation from high school, he was awarded a four-year scholarship to DePauw University in Indiana where he graduated with majors in psychology and pre-medicine in 1944. During his university studies Thetford decided to specialize in psychology, and in 1949 he received his PhD in this field from the University of Chicago.

After graduating from DePauw in January 1944 until the summer of 1945, Thetford had a job as an administrative officer at the University of Chicago working with the science team doing atomic research. During his graduate studies he was one of the first students of the renowned psychologist Carl Rogers.

== Career and hiring of Helen Schucman ==
For five years following his graduation in 1949, Thetford worked as a research psychologist in Chicago, and later in Washington, D.C. He was a research psychologist in the Institute for Psychosomatic & Psychiatric Research & Training at the Reese Hospital in Chicago from 1949 to 1951 and a senior psychologist for the United States government in Washington, DC from 1951 to 1954. In 1953 he was a consultant in Beirut, Lebanon at the Foreign Service Institute. He spent 1954 and 1955 as the director of clinical psychology at The Institute of Living in Hartford, Connecticut. From 1955 to 1957 he was an assistant professor of psychology at Cornell University.

In 1958 he accepted an assistant professorship which later developed into a full professorship, at the Columbia University College of Physicians and Surgeons. During a portion of this period he also served as the Director of Clinical Psychology at the Columbia-Presbyterian Hospital. It was here that he would stay for the next 20 years, and that he first met Helen Schucman, hiring her as a research psychologist and assistant.

A c.v. listing his positions, affiliations, grants, publications and papers is given as Appendix 2 in his biography Never Forget to Laugh by Carol Howe.

== Involvement in the Human Ecology Fund ==
From 1960 to 1964, Thetford received several research grants from the Human Ecology Fund, a CIA funding front used for Project MKULTRA. The Human Ecology Fund provided grants to social scientists and medical researchers to support covert research on brainwashing. The funded social science research projects produced knowledge that was quietly harvested by CIA personnel to develop persuasion, interrogation and torture methods. Together with Helen Schucman, he worked on comparative learning behavior of different personality types. For example, in 1961, Thetford was researcher in Subproject 130 that explored the relationship between personality dimensions and clinical symptoms using the Wechsler intelligence scales.

Some sources claim that Thetford was involved in Project MKUltra from 1971 to 1978. However, MKULTRA was halted in 1973 and most documents were destroyed in the same year.

== A Course in Miracles ==
The working relationship between Thetford and Schucman was apparently often strained, yet throughout these difficulties they would always maintain a certain level of professional courtesy and respect. The story is often told that it was into this environment of strain that the ACIM material was in a sense first “invited” into this world. This “invitation” came one day during one of their difficulties, when Thetford exclaimed, “There must be another way!” This exclamation was followed by a speech he made to Schucman describing how he believed that it was time for them to try to refocus their energies rather than being hypercritical and hypercompetitive with one another. Expecting a condescending response from Schucman, the silence that followed his speech was followed by a surprising concurrence from Schucman, fully supporting his proposal. This speech was given in June 1965.

The next four months were filled with unusually vivid dream sequences and unusual waking experiences for Schucman. Amongst her dream sequences, she began to become familiar with an internal character who spoke to her as Jesus in her dreams. The voice of this dream character would soon come to dominate the rest of her life. Many of her unusual experiences during these four months are recorded in the biographical work, Absence from Felicity, by Kenneth Wapnick. Schucman appears to have confided her experiences with Thetford, who acted as a sort of a calming, encouraging and stabilizing influence for Schucman during this period.

In October 1965, the transcription of A Course In Miracles began. According to both Thetford and Schucman, due to Schucman's intensely divided feelings about the transcription, she would at times require a great deal of reassurance from Thetford to complete the first typewritten copy of ACIM, which later became known as the Urtext. According to Thetford, Schucman was sitting at home on the night of October 21, 1965, when she heard an internal voice say to her, "This is a course in miracles. Please take notes." When she first heard this internal voice, she thought it was the same voice as the dream character that in her recent dream sequences had represented Jesus. Schucman wrote down about a page of notes before she realized that this request was going to be of much greater significance, and would require a far greater commitment in time than it ever had before. In a panic, she phoned Thetford to ask for his advice. Thetford encouraged Schucman to do as the voice asked, and to take the notes. He offered to meet with her the next morning before work to review her notes, to discuss them, and to determine how to respond to this "voice".

The following morning, after Thetford's review of the notes, he was so impressed with what she read to him that he encouraged Schucman to continue with the note taking. She was initially taken aback by Thetford's reaction, but after giving herself time to recover from her jitters and review the notes herself, she agreed. Soon they recognized that the notes, which became A Course in Miracles (referred to as The Course by ACIM students), were their answer, the "other way" that they had agreed to find together four months earlier.

Classifying the transcription as an unusual waking experience was an understatement. During the process Schucman claimed to have the mental equivalent of a tape recorder, which she could turn on and off at will, so that she might be able to transcribe into shorthand notes what she was internally hearing. This voice identified itself to her as the historical Jesus.

At the start, one of Thetford's complaints was, “In the beginning I spent most of my time while typing these notes with one hand on the typewriter and the other on Helen’s shoulder”. After some months of struggling with this process, they both began to experience less subconscious resistance, and the transcription began to move along more smoothly. From 1965 through 1972 Thetford directly assisted Schucman with the transcription of the first three sections of the book, which was the great bulk of the material. Then in 1972, to their relief it appeared that the writing was complete, which for the most part it was.

In 1972 Thetford and Schucman were introduced to Kenneth Wapnick through their mutual friend Father Benedict Groeschel. Wapnick was intrigued by the manuscript although he realized it needed considerable editing to render it publishable. Wapnick urged Helen to review the manuscript with his assistance, which they did, bringing it to completion in the Spring of 1975. Thetford, Wapnick and Schucman, the three principles of ACIM remained friends for the rest of their lives, seeing the manuscript through to publication, and beyond to witness the initial spread of its teachings.

After completion of the initial transcribing process, for brief periods during 1973, 1975, and 1977 the shorter transcription of Psychotherapy, of Clarification of Terms, and of the Song of Prayer, which are the remainder of the standard material of ACIM, were transcribed in similar fashion.

== Move to California and death ==
In 1978, Thetford resigned from his positions at both Columbia University and at Columbia Presbyterian Hospital. In 1980 he packed up his household and, at the apparent invitation of Judith Skutch Whitson, moved to Tiburon, California, where Whitson was employed full-time in the publication and distribution of ACIM.

Then, in Tiburon at age 57, Thetford transitioned into semi-retirement, no longer accepting positions of heavy responsibility in either his professional life or in his involvement with the ever growing readership of ACIM. In California, Thetford took on two part-time positions; one as a psychology consultant at Travis Air Force Base and the other as a director of the ACIM-related Center for Attitudinal Healing in Tiburon, offered to him by his friend and fellow student of ACIM, Gerald Jampolsky.

In California, Thetford spent the final eight years of his life attending meetings of fellow ACIM students where ACIM principles would be discussed, but only rarely engaging in these discussions authoritatively. Instead, during this final period of his life, he appears to have been primarily concerned with his personal study of the ACIM material, and with enriching his own grasp of its message.

On July 4, 1988, at age 65, Thetford died of a heart attack.

== Sources ==
- Wapnick, Kenneth (1999). Absence from Felicity: The Story of Helen Schucman and Her Scribing of A Course in Miracles (2nd ed.). New York: Foundation for A Course in Miracles. ISBN 0-933291-08-6.
- Miller, D. Patrick (August 1997). Complete Story of the Course. Fearless Books. ISBN 0-9656809-0-8.
- Skutch, Robert (1996). Journey Without Distance: The Story Behind A Course in Miracles. Mill Valley: Foundation for Inner Peace. ISBN 1-883360-02-1.
- Howe, Carol M. (2009). Never Forget To Laugh: Personal Recollections of Bill Thetford, Co-Scribe of A Course In Miracles. Carol M. Howe. ISBN 978-1-889642-21-5.
