= Commingling =

Breach of trust by a fiduciary holding a client's funds

In law, commingling is a breach of trust in which a fiduciary mixes funds held in care for a client with their own funds, making it difficult to determine which funds belong to the fiduciary and which belong to the client. This raises particular concerns where the funds are invested, and gains or losses from the investments must be allocated. In such circumstances, the law usually presumes that any gains run to the client and any losses run to the fiduciary who is guilty of commingling. As one source puts it, "[i]n a pejorative sense, commingling is the special vice of fiduciaries (trustee, agents, lawyers, etc.) in failing to keep a beneficiary's money separate from the fiduciary's own money".

Commingling is particularly an issue in case of bankruptcy of the fiduciary. Funds held in care are not the fiduciary's property, and the client is not a creditor. So in case of bankruptcy, if the funds have been properly kept separate, they can easily be returned to the client. If, however, the funds have been commingled, the client is potentially subject to becoming entangled in the bankruptcy proceedings, and there may not be sufficient funds to pay the client back.

== Examples ==
=== Tenant deposits ===
For example, a tenant who deposits money with a landlord has not lent money to the landlord – the tenant is not a creditor – and is entitled to their deposit back even in case that the landlord declares bankruptcy, assuming property is in good condition – the tenant is responsible for the property, but is not undertaking credit risk.

=== Investment funds ===
Similarly, a client who invests with a fund or broker is investing, not lending, so the fiduciary must keep the client money separate and not use it for their own purposes, but only for approved investment purposes: the client is subject to investment risk on his money, but not credit risk regarding the fiduciary.

=== Lawyers and brokers ===
The problem of commingling is of particular concern in the legal profession. Attorneys are strictly prohibited from commingling their clients' funds with their own, and such activity is grounds for disbarment in virtually every jurisdiction, because of the ease of embezzlement and the difficulty of detection. Similar rules apply for licensed real estate brokers handling earnest money and other professionals who hold deposits as agents for clients in absentia.

=== Corporations ===
Commingling is also evidence that may be used in "piercing the corporate veil" of a sham corporation, where a person shields themself from personal liability through "incorporation", yet fails to observe strict separation of corporate and personal property or accounts, among other improprieties.

For small business, strict separation of corporate and personal property is a particular issue, notably in tax and divorce law.

== Community property ==
In community property states of the United States, "commingling" non-marital property with marital property can make it community property. For example, depositing money received by an individual through inheritance – ordinarily considered non-marital, individual property – into a joint bank account may transform the money into community property. Most community property states apply a presumption of community property; where there is any commingling, the burden of proof is on the party disputing the classification to "trace" the property back to individual property, and demonstrate an intent to keep it separated.

== See also ==
- Escrow
