= Helene Lerner =

American author and public television host

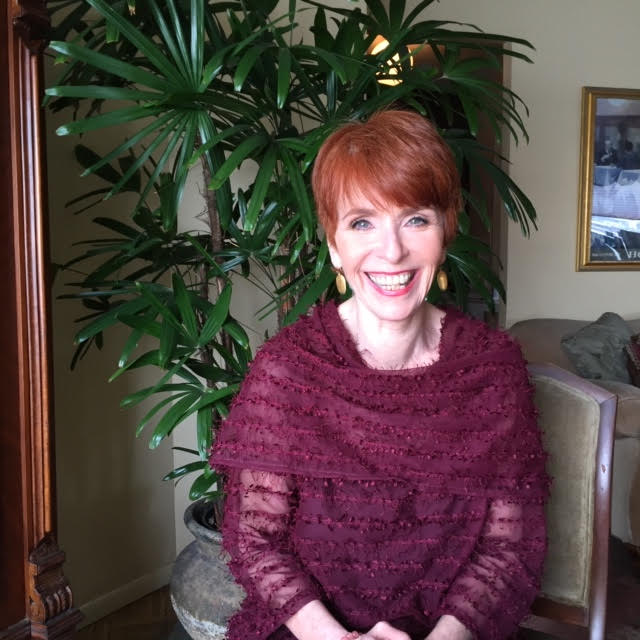
Helene Lerner

Helene Lerner is the founder of WomenWorking.com. She is an author, independent public television host, Emmy award-winning executive producer, and consultant for diverse women in the workplace. Throughout her career, Lerner has focused on issues, including building confidence in working women, channeling personal power, breaking barriers, and sharing broader professional advice.

== Education ==
A member of Phi Beta Kappa, Lerner holds an MBA from Pace University and a master's degree in education from City College in New York City, where she resides.

== Career ==
Lerner began her career as a public school teacher in New York City. Gravitating towards the business world, she moved to sales and marketing at The New York Times in the 1980s. There she began working her way up through the management ranks.

=== Books ===
Lerner is the author of The Confidence Myth: Why Women Undervalue Their Skills and How to Get Over It (2015). They earned praise for her insights on working women.

=== Creative Expansions, Inc. ===
Lerner is the CEO of Creative Expansions, Inc., a multi-media company targeted at women and girls. Since its conception in 1994, Lerner has produced and hosted over twenty televised specials under Creative Expansions, Inc. Lerner's website for career women, WomenWorking.com, is the most active medium under the company's umbrella. Lerner stars in and produces three online miniseries on YouTube, including Unapologetically Honest, Career Advice 101, and Lifestyle Hacks.

=== Recent work ===
Lerner heads a private practice, coaching individuals and groups on empowerment, leadership, and diversity issues.

== Awards ==
Lerner is the recipient of two regional Emmy and many Gracie Awards, named in honor of comedienne Gracie Allen, given to encourage positive and realistic portrayals of women in the media.

Award	Year	Honoring
1997	Gracie Award	Heart Disease: A Woman's Story
1997	National Media OWL Award	Osteoporosis: Your Bones, Your Life
1999	New York Emmy Award	Out of the Darkness: Women and Depression
1999	Gracie Award	Out of the Darkness: Women and Depression
2000	Gracie Award	Blazes of Light: Women Living with HIV/AIDS
2003	Gracie Award	Grab Hold of the Reins: Women in Cancer
2004	New York Emmy Award	Proud to Be a Girl
2004	American Public Television's MVP Award	For outstanding contribution to public television.
2005	Gracie Award	Pure Magic: The Mother-Daughter Bond
2007	Gracie Award	Best Friends: The Power of Sisterhood
2015	24th Annual Media Awards Competition: National Council on Family Relations	A Special Face
