= A Course in Miracles =

1976 book by Helen Schucman

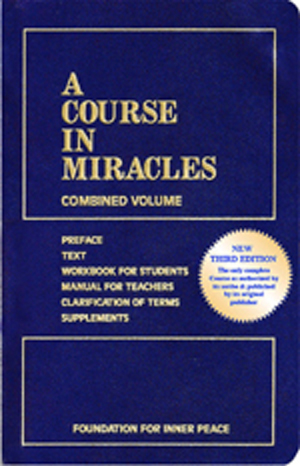
- A Course in Miracles, Combined Volume, Third Edition as published by the Foundation for Inner Peace
- Editor: Helen Schucman, Bill Thetford, Kenneth Wapnick
- Author: There is no author attributed to ACIM, although it was "scribed" by Helen Schucman
- Subject: Spiritual transformation
- Publisher: 1976 (New York: Viking: The Foundation for Inner Peace); 2007 (The Foundation for Inner Peace, 3rd ed.)
- Publication place: United States
- Media type: Print (hardback and paperback)
- Pages: 1333
- ISBN: 978-1-883360-24-5
- OCLC: 190860865

A Course in Miracles (also referred to as ACIM) is a 1976 book by Helen Schucman. The underlying premise is that the greatest "miracle" is the act of simply gaining a full "awareness of love's presence" in a person's life. Schucman said that the book had been dictated to her, word for word, via a process of "inner dictation" from Jesus Christ. The book is considered to have borrowed from New Age movement writings. The book has been called everything from "New Age psychobabble" to "a Satanic seduction" to "The New Age Bible".

Throughout the 1980s, annual sales of the book steadily increased. According to Olav Hammer, the psychiatrist and author Gerald G. Jampolsky was among the most effective promoters of ACIM. Jampolsky's first book, Love is Letting Go of Fear, based on the principles of ACIM, was published in 1979 and, after being endorsed on Johnny Carson's show, sold over three million copies by 1990. The largest growth in sales occurred in 1992 after Marianne Williamson discussed the book on The Oprah Winfrey Show, with more than two million volumes sold.

A highly cited introduction to the course reads:

"Nothing real can be threatened.

Nothing unreal exists.

Herein lies the peace of God." (ACIM, T-in.2:2-4)

== Origins ==
A Course in Miracles was written as a collaborative venture between Schucman and psychologist William ("Bill") Thetford. In 1958, Schucman began her professional career at Columbia–Presbyterian Medical Center in New York City as Thetford's research associate. In 1965, at a time when their weekly office meetings had become so contentious that they both dreaded them, Thetford suggested to Schucman that "[t]here must be another way". Schucman answered that she agreed and that she will help Bill find that other way. She believed that this interaction acted as a stimulus, triggering a series of inner experiences that were understood by her as visions, dreams, and heightened imagery, along with an "inner voice" that she identified as Jesus (although the ACIM text itself never explicitly claims that the voice she hears speaking is that of Jesus). She said that on October 21, 1965, an "inner voice" told her: "This is a Course in Miracles, please take notes."

Schucman said the writing made her very uncomfortable, though it never seriously occurred to her to stop. The next day, she explained the events of her "note-taking" to Thetford. To her surprise, Thetford encouraged her to continue the process. He also offered to assist her in typing out her notes as she read them to him. The process continued the next day and repeated regularly for many years. In 1972, the writing of the three main sections of ACIM was completed, with some additional minor writing coming after that point.

Kenneth Wapnick helped edit the book and founded the Foundation for A Course in Miracles.

For copyright purposes, US courts determined that the author of the text was Schucman, not Jesus. Kenneth Wapnick, psychologist, devotee and teacher of the ACIM, believed that Schucman did not channel Jesus, but was describing her "own mental experience of divine 'love'".

== Content and themes ==
ACIM has three sections: "Text", "Workbook for Students", and "Manual for Teachers". Written from 1965 to 1972, some distribution occurred via photocopies before the Foundation for Inner Peace published a hardcover edition in 1976. The copyright and trademarks, which had been held by two foundations, were revoked in 2004 after lengthy litigation because the earliest versions had been circulated without a copyright notice.

In ACIM, it is written that "the ego's death is your life." The ego is presented as a non-entity, an illusion that ceases to exist once one lays it down: "When you have given up the illusion of the ego, you will realize that the ego never existed, and that the only thing that ever existed, and still exists, is God and His creations." Therefore, in ACIM, the ego is simply an illusion that appears to obscure one's oneness with God and his creations, not an essential part of oneself. To summarize the effects of letting go of the ego, it is written, "When the ego has been dispelled, there will be no separation, and you will be wholly real," "real" referring to being in alignment with God and how he created the reader.

== Reception ==
Since it went on sale in 1976, the book has been translated into 27 languages. It is distributed globally, spawning a range of organized groups.

Wapnick said that "if the Bible were considered literally true, then (from a Biblical literalist's viewpoint) the Course would have to be viewed as demonically inspired". He also said, "I often taught in the context of the Bible, even though it is obvious to serious students of A Course in Miracles that it and the Bible are fundamentally incompatible." Course-teachers Robert Perry, Greg Mackie, and Allen Watson disagreed about that. Though a friend of Schucman, Thetford, and Wapnick, Catholic priest Benedict Groeschel criticized ACIM and related organizations. Finding some elements of ACIM to be "severe and potentially dangerous distortions of Christian theology", he wrote that it is "a good example of a false revelation" and that it has "become a spiritual menace to many". The evangelical editor Elliot Miller says that Christian terminology employed in ACIM is "thoroughly redefined" to resemble New Age teachings. Other Christian critics say that ACIM is "intensely anti-biblical" and incompatible with Christianity, blurring the distinction between creator and created and forcefully supporting an occult and New Age worldview.

Olav Hammer locates A Course in Miracles in the tradition of channeled works from those of Madam Blavatsky to Rudolf Steiner's and notes the close parallels between Christian Science and the teachings of the Course. Hammer called it "gnosticizing beliefs". In "'Knowledge is Truth': A Course in Miracles as Neo-Gnostic Scripture" in Gnosis: Journal of Gnostic Studies, Simon J. Joseph outlines the relationship between the Course and Gnostic thinking. Daren Kemp also considers ACIM neo-Gnostic and agrees with Hammer that it is a channeled text. The course has been viewed as a way that "integrates a psychological world view with a universal spiritual perspective" and linked to transpersonal psychology.

Joseph declared:

Consequently, new manuscript discoveries, lost gospels, and new "scriptural" revelations represent an effective way of subverting the traditional picture of early Christian origins and destabilizing traditional Christian authority by redefining the cultural boundaries of Christianity in contemporary culture. [...] Since the Course's redefinition of terms is so offensive to its critics, [...] the Gospel narrative that the Course subverts and redefines is the suffering, death, and crucifixion of Jesus.

— Simon J. Joseph

Another dismissal of ACIM and claim for its subversiveness comes from some on the political left, who note that William Thetford, who encouraged and helped bring Schucman's work to press, was a CIA operative and psychologist. In Harper's Magazine, Sheila Heti quotes a post asserting the CIA sought "to infiltrate and dilute the American left with New Age ideas and inwardly-focused, anti-rational religious movements".

The Skeptic's Dictionary describes ACIM as "a minor industry" that is overly commercialized and characterizes it as "Christianity improved". Robert T. Carroll wrote that the teachings are not original but culled from "various sources, east, and west". He adds that it has gained increased popularity as New Age spirituality writer Marianne Williamson promoted a variant.

== Associated works ==
Two works have been described as extensions of A Course in Miracles, Gary Renard's 2003 The Disappearance of the Universe and Marianne Williamson's A Return to Love published in 1992. The Disappearance of the Universe, published in 2003 by Fearless Books, was republished by Hay House in 2004. Publishers Weekly reported that Renard's examination of A Course in Miracles influenced his book.
