= Marianne Williamson =

American author and political activist (born 1952)

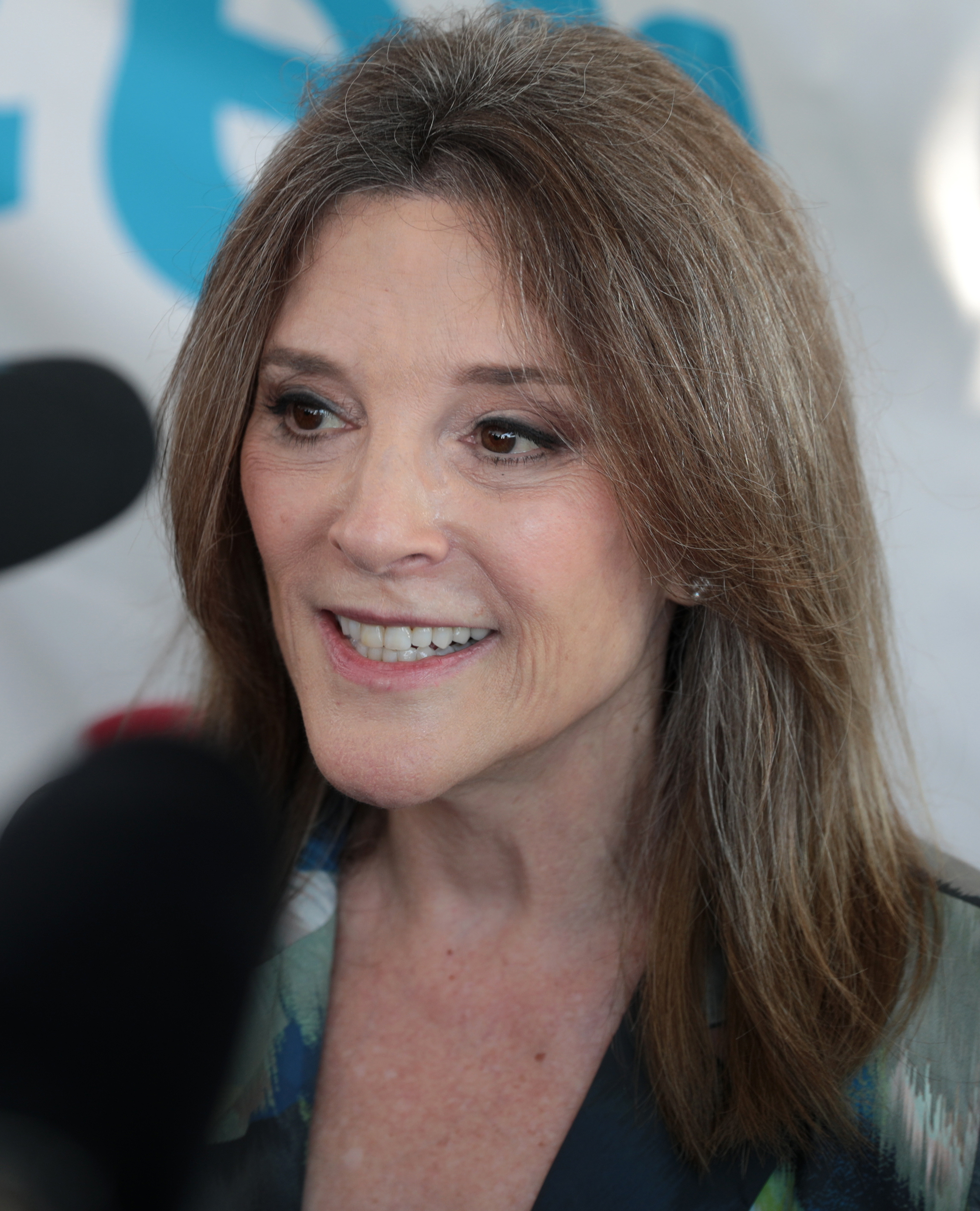
- Williamson in 2019
- Born: Marianne Deborah Williamson; July 8, 1952 (age 74); Houston, Texas, U.S.
- Education: Pomona College
- Occupations: Author; teacher; politician; activist
- Political party: Independent (until 2015); Democratic (2015–present)
- Children: 1
- Website: Official website

Signature
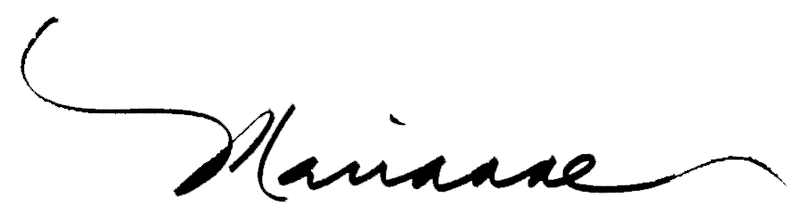

Marianne Deborah Williamson (born July 8, 1952) is an American self-help author, speaker, and political activist. She began her professional career as a spiritual leader of the Church of Today, a Unity Church in Warren, Michigan. Williamson has written several self-help books, including A Return to Love: Reflections on the Principles of A Course in Miracles in 1992, which became a New York Times Best Seller. She rose to prominence through frequent appearances on Oprah Winfrey's show, and becoming known as her "spiritual advisor".

Williamson ran unsuccessfully as an independent for California's 33rd congressional district in the United States House of Representatives in 2014, finishing fourth with 13.2% of the vote. She ran for the Democratic nomination for president in 2020, eventually dropping out and endorsing Bernie Sanders. She ran for president again in 2024, challenging incumbent President Joe Biden. After having suspended and restarted her campaign, Williamson ended her longshot White House bid in July 2024. She unsuccessfully campaigned for the position of DNC chair in 2025.

Williamson has been actively involved with charity work, founding such organizations as Center for Living in 1987, Project Angel Food in 1989, and the Peace Alliance in 1998. Allegations of abusive and bullying behavior toward both colleagues and staff have followed her throughout her career.

== Early life and education ==
Marianne Deborah Williamson was born in Houston, Texas, on July 8, 1952. She is the youngest of three children of Samuel "Sam" Williamson, a World War II veteran and immigration lawyer, and Sophie Ann Kaplan, a homemaker and community volunteer.

Williamson was raised in an upper-middle-class family that practiced Conservative Judaism. Her family attended Congregation Beth Yeshurun. She learned about world religions and social justice at home and became interested in public advocacy when she saw her rabbi speak against the Vietnam War.

In 1965, after Williamson came home from school in the seventh grade, she recounted to her parents that her teacher supported the Vietnam War. Her father reacted by taking the family to Vietnam to help explain to Marianne why he thought that the war was wrong. She has said that through travel she "had an experience, at a young age, that people are the same everywhere."

Williamson attended Houston ISD's Bellaire High School. After graduating, she spent two years studying theater and philosophy at Pomona College in Claremont, California, where she was a roommate of future film producer Lynda Obst. In 1973, Williamson dropped out of college and lived "a nomadic existence" during what she calls "her wasted decade".

Williamson moved to New Mexico, where she took classes at the University of New Mexico. The couple broke up a year later. Marianne then moved to Austin, Texas, where she took classes at the University of Texas. After leaving Texas, she went to New York City, intending to pursue a career as a cabaret singer; however, she has stated that she was distracted by "bad boys and good dope". Vanity Fair wrote that Williamson "spent her twenties in a growing state of existential despair." In New York, Williamson suffered from deep depression following the end of a relationship. She has said that this experience gave rise to a desire to spend the rest of her life helping people. Allegations of abusive behavior toward colleagues and staff have followed her throughout her career.

== A Course in Miracles ==
Although initially uninterested due to her Jewish faith, Williamson developed an interest in Helen Schucman's book A Course in Miracles in 1976. She explored spirituality, metaphysics, and meditation as she began reading the Course "passionately". She also reconciled the Course with her Jewishness; in her view, "A conversion to Christ is not a conversion to Christianity. It is a conversion to a conviction of the heart".

Williamson said the book was her "path out of hell", as she had been "mired in a series of unhappy love affairs, alcohol and drug abuse, a nervous breakdown, and endless sessions with therapists." The Course has often been described as a religion or pseudoreligion. Williamson disagrees, describing it as a "spiritual psychotherapy" instead of a religion.

== Career ==
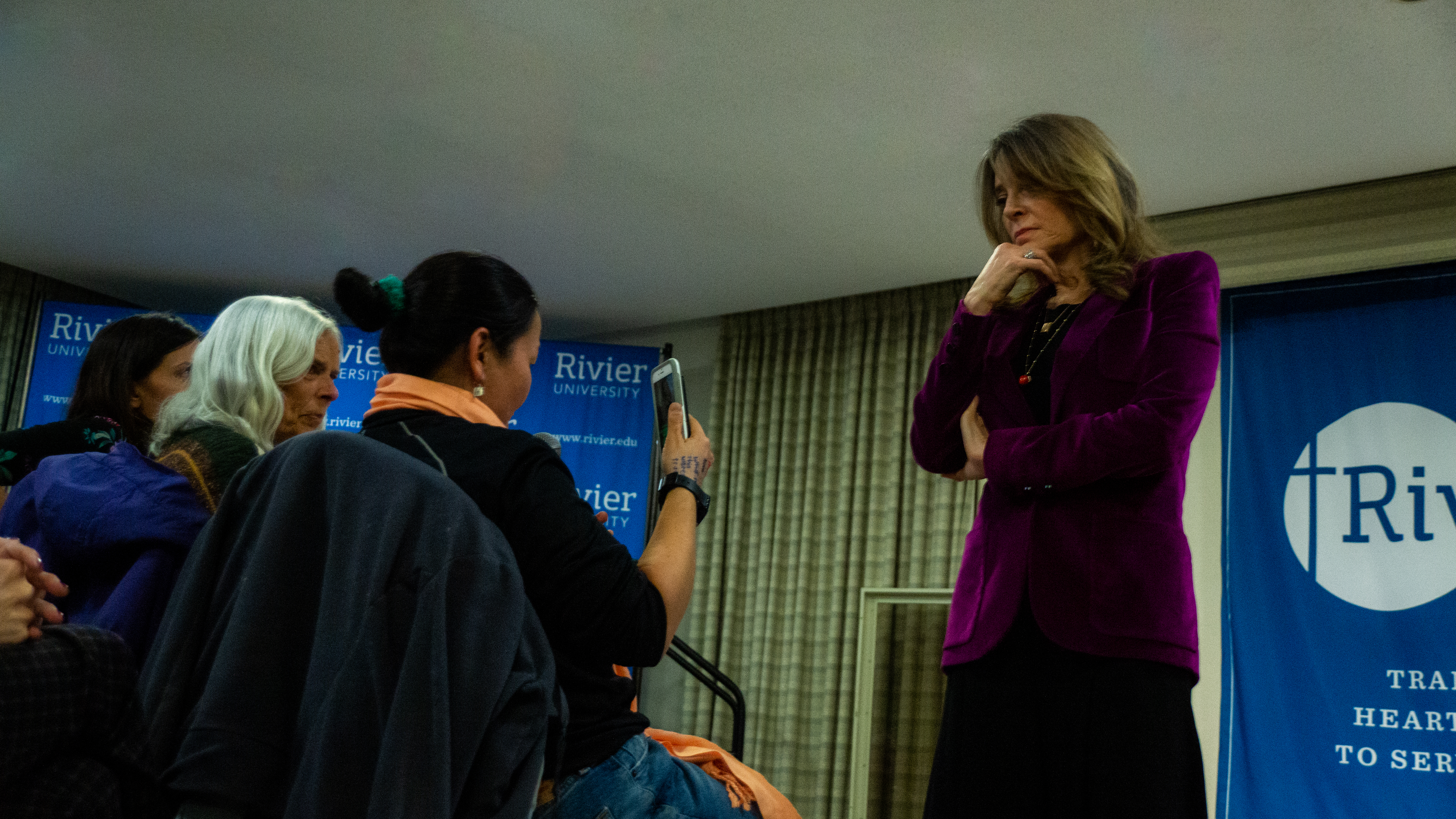
Williamson, 2019

In 1979, Williamson returned to Houston, where she ran a metaphysical bookstore coffee shop, sang Gershwin standards in a nightclub, got married and divorced "almost immediately", and underwent a "spiritual surrender".

In 1983, Williamson had what she has called a "flash" to close the coffee shop and move to Los Angeles. She rented an apartment in Hollywood, where her roommate was 17-year-old Laura Dern. Dern has stated that Williamson "held prayer groups in our living room."

Williamson's teachings stemmed from an inspirational message: "Divine love is the core and essence of every human mind." She saw this message as a remedy to misinterpretations of the Bible that, through an emphasis on sin and guilt, could lead to harm (e.g., slavery, depression, self-loathing).

As word spread about "the young woman talking about a God who loves you, no matter what," she had to rent church space to accommodate the demand to hear her speak. In 1987, she began lecturing monthly in New York. Eventually, she was invited to speak throughout the U.S. and Europe. Williamson did not charge for her lectures but had a "suggested donation" of $7 and a policy of not turning people away for lack of money. Williamson's style has been described as a "trendy amalgam of Christianity, Buddhism, pop psychology and 12-step recovery wisdom".

=== Unity Church ===
Williamson became the spiritual leader for the Church of Today, a Unity Church in Warren, Michigan, where she had 2,300 congregants and 50,000 television viewers. Her position also included administrative leadership; her actions as leader included booking Aerosmith's Steven Tyler, expanding the bookstore, and increasing the congregation's racial and sexual orientation diversity. As a result, the Church grew rapidly.

=== Author ===
Oprah's SuperSoul Conversations Podcast: Marianne Williamson – "A Return to Love"

Williamson has written 17 books as of 2026. Seven have appeared on the New York Times bestseller list, with four reaching number one. She has sold more than three million books.

Williamson's most popular self-help work is A Return to Love: Reflections on the Principles of A Course in Miracles (1992). The book appeared on The New York Times bestseller list for 39 weeks in the "Advice, How To and Miscellaneous" category; it teaches that practicing love every day will bring more peace and fulfillment to one's life. The following quotation is the most famous quotation from the book (it is often misattributed to Nelson Mandela):

Our deepest fear is not that we are inadequate. Our deepest fear is that we are powerful beyond measure. It is our light, not our darkness, that most frightens us. We ask ourselves, who am I to be brilliant, gorgeous, talented, fabulous? Actually, who are you not to be? You are a child of God. Your playing small doesn't serve the world. There's nothing enlightened about shrinking so that other people won't feel insecure around you. We are all meant to shine, as children do. We were born to make manifest the glory of God that is within us. It's not just in some of us; it's in everyone. And as we let our own light shine, we unconsciously give other people permission to do the same. As we're liberated from our own fear, our presence automatically liberates others.

Oprah Winfrey said of the book, "I have never been more moved by a book than I am by this one." Winfrey bought 1,000 copies and encouraged her audience to purchase it, telling them that after reading it, she experienced 157 miracles. Williamson was a frequent guest on The Oprah Winfrey Show, and became Oprah's spiritual advisor.

== Political campaigns ==
=== 2014 U.S. House of Representatives campaign ===
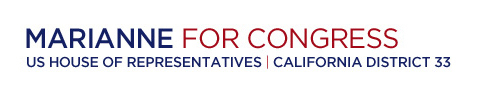
Williamson's 2014 congressional campaign logo

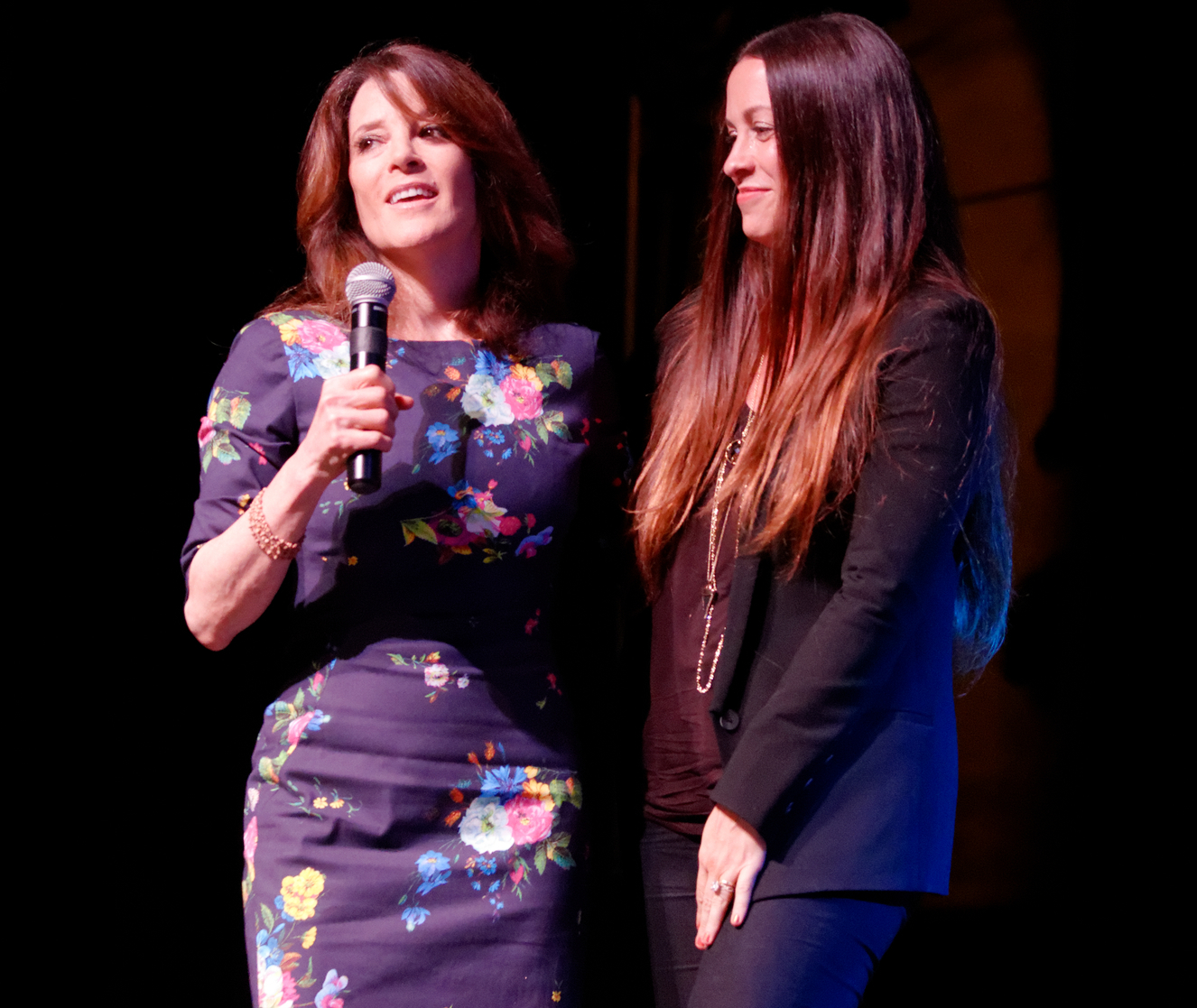
Williamson campaigning alongside Alanis Morissette

In 2014, Williamson ran as an Independent for California's 33rd congressional district in the U.S. House of Representatives.

Prominent elected and public officials endorsed her campaign, including Ben Cohen; former governors Jennifer Granholm and Jesse Ventura; former representatives Dennis Kucinich and Alan Grayson; and Van Jones. Alanis Morissette wrote and performed Williamson's campaign song, "Today".

Williamson campaigned on progressive issues such as campaign finance reform, women's reproductive rights and LGBTQ equality. She raised $2.4 million, of which she personally contributed 25 percent.

Williamson finished fourth out of 18 candidates, with 14,335 votes or 13.2 percent of the vote. Republican Elan Carr finished first in the primary with 21.6 percent of the vote, but went on to lose the general election to Democrat Ted Lieu.

=== 2020 presidential campaign ===
On November 15, 2018, Williamson announced the formation of a presidential exploratory committee. On January 28, 2019, Williamson officially launched her presidential campaign before an audience of 2,000 people in Los Angeles. Williamson's campaign committee, "Marianne Williamson for President", officially filed on February 4.

As of May 1, Williamson had a campaign staff of 20. A week later, she announced she had received enough contributions from unique donors to enter the official primary debates. Her campaign had raised $1.5 million (~$1.86 million in 2025) in the first quarter of 2019, during which it received donations from 46,663 unique individuals. Williamson subsequently met the polling criteria, with three unique polls at one percent from qualifying pollsters, on May 23.

In June, Williamson confirmed that she had moved to Des Moines, Iowa, in advance of the 2020 caucuses. In response to the Iowa Democratic Party's proposed creation of "virtual caucuses" in the 2020 race, Williamson's campaign announced it would appoint 99 "Virtual Iowa Caucus Captains" (each assigned to a single county) to turn out supporters in both the virtual and in-person caucuses.

Later that month, Williamson participated in the first primary debate. The LA Times wrote that Democratic voters were "confused" and "transfixed" by Williamson, who declared that her first act as president would be to call New Zealand Prime Minister Jacinda Ardern and say, "Girlfriend, you are so on", a reference to Ardern's emphasis on building a country that treats its children well. Williamson also received media attention for her closing remarks:

In the closing moments of Thursday night’s Democratic debate, Marianne Williamson looked straight ahead and told the audience that her plan for her candidacy is to harness the country’s love. “Mr. President, if you’re listening,” she said, addressing Donald Trump directly, “you have harnessed fear for political purposes, and only love can cast that out. I am going to harness love for political purposes,” she continued, raising her eyebrows. “And sir, love will win.”

On July 30, Williamson participated in the second primary debate. She was the most Googled candidate in 49 of 50 states and received the fourth-most attention on X, then known as Twitter. The spike in searches was prompted by her reference to the Flint water crisis and her assertion that President Trump was harnessing a "dark psychic force of the collectivized hatred," which she later described as racism, bigotry, antisemitism, homophobia, Islamophobia, and xenophobia propelled by social media.

On the day of the third DNC debate, for which she did not qualify, Williamson did an interview with Eric Bolling and expressed further frustration with the media when she thought she was not being recorded. Among her unscripted comments was "what does it say that Fox News is nicer to me than the lefties are?"

On January 10, 2020, Williamson announced the end of her campaign and pledged to support the Democratic nominee.

Many pundits treated Williamson's brief campaign as comic relief, often characterizing her as a novelty candidate due to her unconventional approach and spiritual rhetoric. However, some found her message persuasive and influential. After the July 30, 2019, Democratic debate, New York Times columnist Jamelle Bouie wrote, "It feels insane to say this, but Williamson out-debated virtually everyone else on the stage. She gave a compelling answer on reparations and returned again and again to the most important issue for Democratic voters, beating Trump."

=== 2024 presidential campaign ===
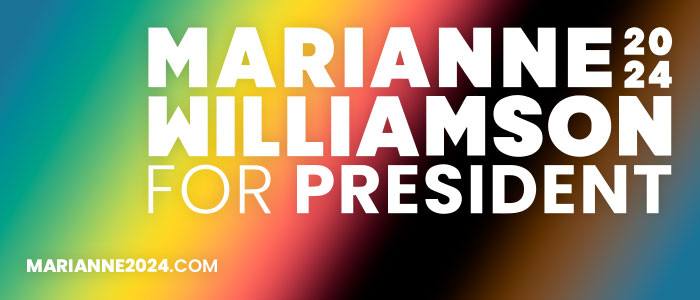
A Marianne Williamson 2024 logo

Williamson began "working on putting a machine together" to run for president in 2024, visiting South Carolina and New Hampshire in early 2023. On February 23, 2023, she confirmed that she would launch a run for president in the future. She started her 2024 campaign on March 4, 2023.

Williamson's 2024 deputy campaign manager, Jason Call, departed from her team on May 20, 2023, a week after her campaign manager, Peter Daou, had announced similar intentions. The two gave substantially different reasons for their actions than did the campaign. Earlier in 2023, a dozen former staffers from her 2020 campaign, who remained anonymous due to having signed non-disclosure agreements (NDAs), described working for Williamson as "toxic," "traumatic," and "terrifying". Williamson has been accused of throwing phones and shouting at staff so intensely they were reduced to tears. According to one account, her anger over logistics in South Carolina led her to strike a car repeatedly to the extent that she had to receive medical attention for a swollen hand. Williamson has denied the phone-throwing charge, admitted to the car incident, and acknowledged that she may have room for personal growth.

More staff, including Williamson's new campaign manager, left Williamson's team in June 2023.

In July 2023, Politico reported that Williamson had contributed $220,000 to her own campaign and that the campaign's most recent financial disclosure showed $270,000 in unpaid debts.

Williamson placed third in the New Hampshire Democratic primary with about 4 percent of the vote. Following the primary, she held an online meeting with campaign volunteers to discuss her next steps. A recording of the call was later circulated on social media, although Williamson continued her campaign.

She suspended her campaign after receiving 2.1 percent of the vote in the South Carolina primary and 2.9 percent in the Nevada primary, receiving no delegates. After the Michigan primary, in which she received 3 percent of the vote, Williamson announced that she was resuming her campaign. In the Kansas primary, Greeley County recorded a three-way tie between Biden, "None of these names", and Williamson.

Williamson ended her campaign on June 11, 2024. She re-entered the race on July 2, 2024. Williamson also expressed interest in an open convention after President Biden had announced he was dropping out of the race. On July 29, 2024, she ended her campaign for the final time.

Williamson received 473,761 popular votes, or 2.85% of the popular vote, in the 2024 Democratic presidential primaries.

=== 2025 Democratic National Committee chairmanship campaign ===
On December 26, 2024, Williamson announced her candidacy in the election of the Democratic National Committee chairperson. On January 10, 2025, Williamson shared on X that the DNC Ethnic Council informed her that she would be excluded from their DNC candidate forum that day. Williamson responded with a letter to the DNC Ethnic Council denouncing her exclusion and said, "This elitist choosing who is allowed to speak and who is not allowed to speak dishonors democratic principles and Democrats."

On February 1, 2025, Williamson endorsed frontrunner Ken Martin.

== Political positions ==
=== Abortion rights ===
As a candidate for 2024 U.S. President, Williamson has stated her strong support for abortion access, services, and choice. She has spoken in favor of the abortion rights that were guaranteed under the subsequently overturned 1973 Supreme Court decision Roe v. Wade.

Williamson has shared her belief that it is good to expand women's understanding of alternatives; however, eradicating or limiting women's options would not reduce the number of terminations sought. Instead, it would result in wealthier women having access to safe abortions while poorer women face risks to their health.

=== Animal rights ===
In 2020 and 2024, Williamson's presidential campaign published detailed policy proposals to protect animal welfare. In 2019, Williamson stated that she supports a prohibition on the construction and expansion of concentrated animal feeding operations (CAFOs), also known as factory farms. She has stated that the mistreatment of animals is "damaging to the American soul."

=== Reparations ===
Williamson supports the distribution of $200-$500 billion in reparations for slavery, spread across 20 years for "economic and education projects", to be disbursed based on the recommendation of an "esteemed council of African-American leaders".

=== Climate change and energy ===
Williamson deems climate change to be "the greatest moral challenge of our generation." She claimed support for the Green New Deal, immediate re-entry into the Paris Climate Accords, and has stated that she would be willing to support the Trans-Pacific Partnership if it included greater protections for workers and the environment.

Williamson also supports the U.S. directing subsidies from fossil fuels, including coal, and re-investing them in the development of renewable energy, both in the U.S. and abroad, particularly in developing countries.

=== Gun control ===
Williamson supports gun control, and has described the issue as one personal to her. On November 4, 2018, she gave a keynote address to several hundred Muslim and Jewish women at the Sisterhood of Salaam-Shalom conference in Doylestown, Pennsylvania, eight days after 11 Jewish people were murdered the Pittsburgh synagogue shooting. A Jewish woman herself, Williamson argued against fear being used as a political force and advocated for love in its place.

=== Health care and vaccinations ===
Williamson supports universal health care under a "Medicare for All type of plan". Williamson also supports independent regulation of the pharmaceutical industry to prevent what she has called "predatory practices".

A "both-and" approach (both prayer and medicine) to physical and mental health has been attributed to Williamson. Williamson has said, "People who are prayed for get out of the emergency room faster," and "people who have been diagnosed with a life-challenging illness, who attend spiritual support groups, live, on average, twice as long after diagnosis".

Williamson has stated her support for the necessity and value of vaccinations and antidepressants, and has expressed skepticism about the pharmaceutical industry's influence in setting guidelines for how they are administered, citing her belief that their profit motive could result in harm to patients. She has also criticized overprescription of antidepressants, questioning whether antidepressants play a role in suicide, said that the distinction between ordinary sadness and clinical depression is "artificial", and described the process by which clinical depression is diagnosed as "a scam".

In 2015, Williamson had said "the facts are in about measles," but also advocated "a skepticism, which is actually healthy, on this issue of vaccinations." During Williamson's presidential campaign, in June 2019, she skepticism of vaccine mandates, which she described as "draconian" and "Orwellian". However in an interview with Vanity Fair that July, Williamson walked back these comments and denied accusations that she was "anti-science", stating "I’m very pro-science. I’m so pro-science; I want more scientific research. I want independent scientific research that is not tied only to big pharmaceutical companies. And is not suppressed by them. If anything, I’m the one asking for a greater array of scientific perspective." Williamson has also expressed frustration about what she perceived to be a conflation of her skepticism of the pharmaceutical industry with skepticism of the science of vaccines. She has said, "Skeptical about vaccinations I have not expressed. Skeptical about Big Pharma in general I have expressed. And there is a big difference."

=== Immigration ===
Williamson does not support open borders, but calls for what she describes as a more humane approach to border policy. In June 2019, Williamson criticized then-President Donald Trump on his immigration policies after reports of children being separated from their families and being put in a detainment center; she called these acts "state-sponsored crimes". After Trump's announcement that ICE would begin mass-deportations of illegal immigrants, she said it is "no different" from what Jewish people faced in Nazi Germany.

Williamson supports Deferred Action for Childhood Arrivals (DACA) and expanding protections and naturalization to undocumented immigrants who were brought to the United States as children.

=== Other domestic issues ===
Williamson supports The Equality Act and an increase of the federal minimum wage to $15 per hour, and has called religion a map in which "the route isn't important. It's the destination that matters."

=== International relations and national security ===
Williamson supports the creation of a United States Department of Peace to aid in her proposed redesign, which also includes a plan to establish a Peace Academy modeled after military academies.

Williamson supports military engagement when a NATO ally is threatened, when the United States is under threat of attack, or "when the humanitarian order of the world is at risk".

Williamson supported safe withdrawal of all U.S. troops from Afghanistan as soon as possible and would consider the use of a peace-keeping force, such as the United Nations, to assist with the transition. Williamson has said she supports the U.S. vigorously using its position, i.e., through CFIUS, to prevent China from buying strategically important companies, which she believes will help defend U.S. economic interests and human rights, as in the cases of the Uighurs and residents of Hong Kong. Williamson supports rejoining the Joint Comprehensive Plan of Action (JCPOA). Williamson criticized the Trump administration for elevating tensions with Iran. Williamson supports a two-state solution to the Israeli–Palestinian conflict.

== Public image ==
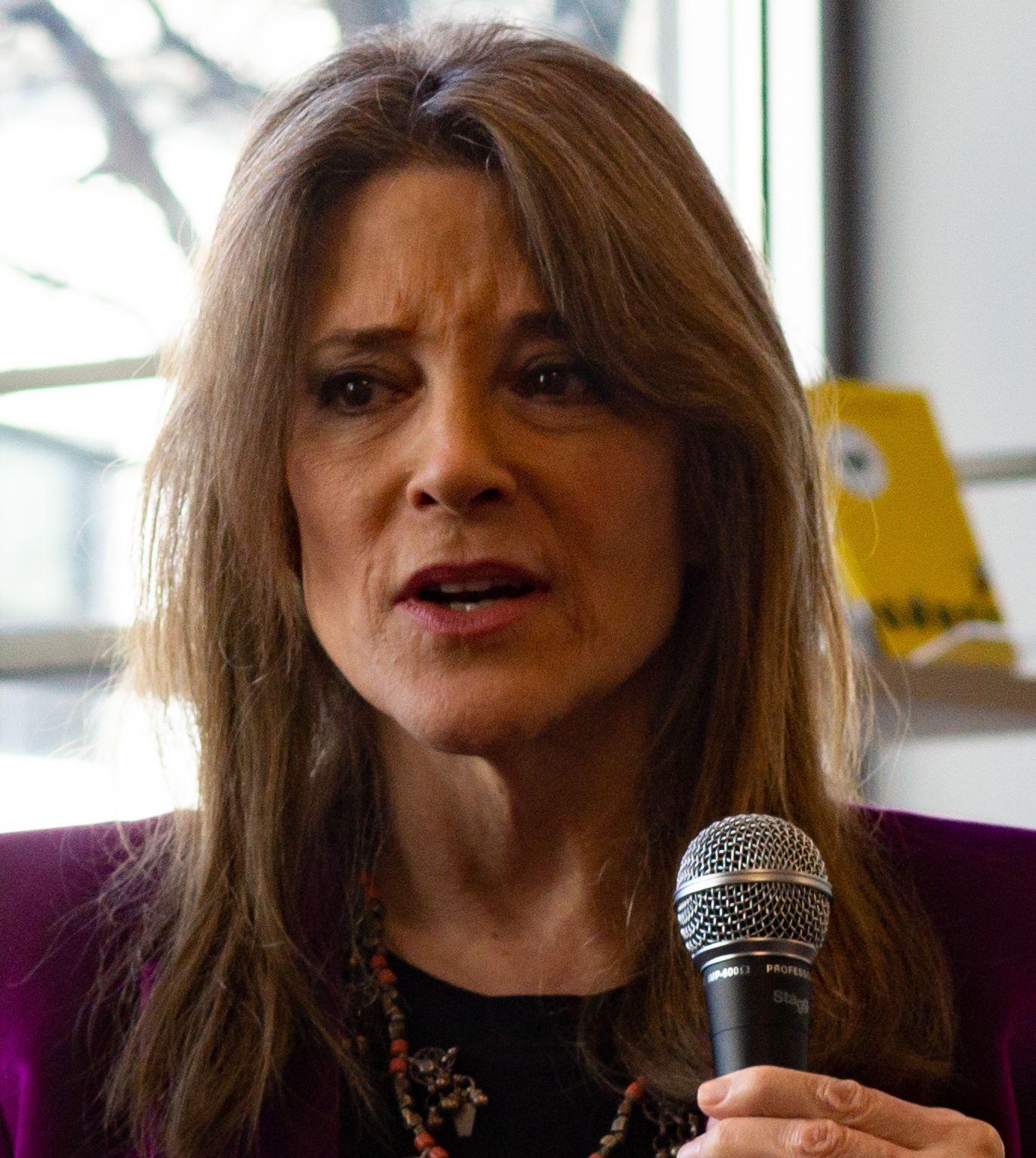
Williamson in February 2019

Williamson has been referred to as a "New Age guru". The label has been associated with her for years, but she has long rejected such terms, calling them "outrageous". Williamson has also been described as an activist, a "populist adult educator", a philosopher, and a mystic. She has stated that she prefers to be called an author.

In the context of her political campaigns, Williamson's image has polarized many, with some praising her as authentic and eloquent, while others have criticized her for lacking seriousness. Her performance during the 2020 Democratic presidential debates received praise from a number of politicians, such as Democrats Jennifer Granholm and Ro Khanna, and media outlets like The Washington Post, for providing "surprisingly eloquent" and "meaningful" answers to questions on social issues. Others have criticized her responses, including a writer for Vox who called her answers "extremely vague" and "deeply weird", and a writer for Salon who called her answers "kooky". Williamson's unorthodox style led to a large response across social media platforms such as Twitter, where she was the subject of various jokes and memes.

She made headlines when she criticized Vogue for its "insidious influence" when it did not include her in an Annie Leibovitz photo shoot of the 2020 female presidential candidates. The magazine responded that it only wanted "to highlight the five female lawmakers who bring a collective 40 years of political experience to this race." Williamson subsequently posted a fan-made picture of the Vogue photo with herself edited in.

== Personal life and family ==
Williamson's older brother, Peter, became an immigration attorney like his father. Her late sister, Elizabeth "Jane," was a teacher. Her father and her maternal grandparents were Russian Jewish immigrants. Her grandfather changed his surname from Vishnevetsky to Williamson after seeing "Alan Williamson Ltd" on a train.

She was briefly married in 1979 to a Houston businessman. She said the marriage lasted "for a minute and a half".

In 1990, she gave birth to a daughter.

In 2006, a Newsweek poll named her one of the 50 most influential baby boomers.

In 2013, Williamson reported having assets estimated to be valued between $1 million and $5 million (not including personal residences).

As of 2026, Williamson lives in London and Washington, D.C.

== Charity work ==
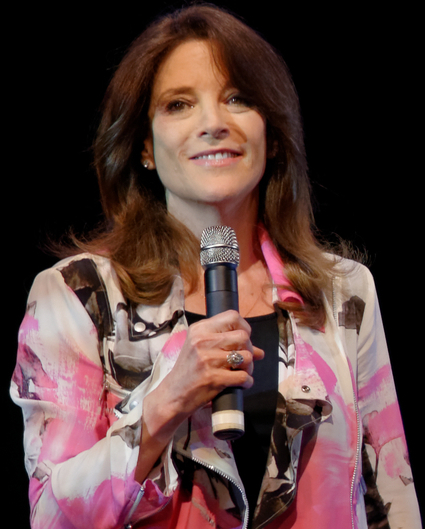
Williamson in 2014

Since the 1980s, Williamson has operated charities based on the principles of the Course.

=== Centers for Living ===
In 1987, inspired by a friend's struggle with breast cancer, Williamson launched the Center for Living, after a $50,000 donation from David Geffen. Williamson co-founded the organization with Louise Hay—a minister of the New Thought Church of Religious Science—who claimed to have healed herself of cancer.

The Center primarily assists people afflicted with HIV/AIDS, particularly gay men, who were openly welcomed when shunned and refused help by other organizations. The Center provided services such as housework, daily chores, meditation, massage, psychological counseling, and emotional support throughout the city and county of Los Angeles.

In 1989, having received another advance of $50,000 (~$112,824 in 2025) from Geffen, Williamson opened a second Center for Living, this time in New York City; this location was hampered by a conflict between staff and the board regarding Williamson's management style, which an anonymous former associate described as "very controlling".

Unlike in Los Angeles, the more secular New York had requested for Williamson not to pray, fueling a further disconnect.

A few months later, after two of Williamson's board members told Vanity Fair that she wanted "to be famous," Williamson felt that she was being treated as "expendable". This notion would lead to the expulsion of several of her board members, including the then-head of the New York Center, as well as of film director Mike Nichols.

Williamson stepped down from her role at the Centers in the summer of 1992. The New York Center was able to remain open, following a donation from Cher. Williamson gave the organization an extra $50,000 check and left, but remained an advisor to the organization. The Los Angeles Times reported that Williamson was "losing trust" in several board members and "preemptively" fired them before her own potential downfall. She disputed this, claiming that she intended to "step down as President," wishing to provide her successor with a "clean slate".

=== Project Angel Food ===
In 1989, with the Centers' success, Williamson launched Project Angel Food (a program operated by The Centers for Living) to support HIV/AIDS patients. By 1992, it had raised over $1.5 million and was delivering nearly 400 hot meals a day to homebound AIDS patients in Los Angeles.

Williamson resigned from Project Angel Food in March 1992. Employees demanded the resignation of Williamson and the replacement of members of the board, threatening unionization if Williamson did not resign. Consultant Stephen Bennett determined that there were more paid staff on hand than needed, but with a union vote pending, he refused to lay employees off.

Project Angel Food struggled for a time following Williamson's departure (Williamson had been the primary fundraiser) but remained operational. By 1998 it had over 1,500 volunteers and nearly 1,000 clients. As of 2018, with expanded food, nutrition and counseling services, it delivered 12,000 meals weekly throughout Los Angeles. As of 2019, Williamson remains a trustee of the organization.

==== AIDS work ====
Williamson has helped gay men who she said "were told that they weren't loved by their family and friends, employers, politicians, hospitals." She has officiated at funerals, driven men to their doctors, and paid for patients' AIDS medication.

During her 2020 presidential campaign, Williamson was accused of telling gay men not to take medication for AIDS, of implying that they were "not positive enough" to counter the disease, of telling them that they "deserved" the disease, and of telling them to "pray the AIDS away." She has repeatedly denied these accusations. Most of the accusations appeared to stem from excerpts or paraphrases of her 1992 book A Return to Love.

=== The Peace Alliance ===
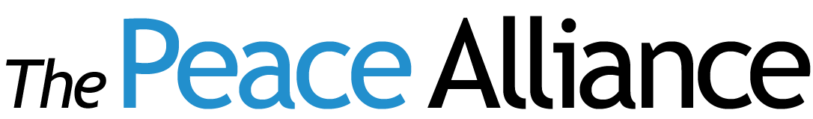

In 1998, Williamson co-founded the non-profit Global Renaissance Alliance (GSA) with Conversations with God author Neale Donald Walsch. The organization established a network of "citizen salons" to pray for national growth, peace and liberal causes. According to Williamson, the GSA sat in small "Peace Circles" of fewer than 12 people every other week and prayed together.

In 2004, the GSA's name was changed to The Peace Alliance and was given a new mandate focused on grassroots education and advocacy organization. The intended purpose was to increase U.S. government support for peace-building approaches to domestic and international conflicts. The Peace Alliance advocated for lobbying congressional representatives directly.

=== "Sister Giant" conferences ===
In 2010, Williamson launched "Sister Giant", a series of conferences to "start a new conversation about transformational politics" and encourage more women to run for office:

In 2012, Yale University's Women's Campaign School – an independent, nonpartisan, issue-neutral political campaign training and leadership program hosted at Yale Law School – partnered with the series, which focused on how to better address social issues like child poverty, campaign finance reform, and high incarceration rates.

=== RESULTS ===
For several years until 2017, Williamson was a board member of Results Educational Fund (RESULTS), a 501(c)(3) nonprofit charity dedicated to finding long-term solutions to poverty by focusing on its root causes, and its sister organization, Results Inc., a 501(c)(4) "social welfare" organization that encourages "grassroots advocates to lobby their elected officials" and works "directly with Congress and other U.S. policymakers to shape and advance" anti-poverty policies. The organization has 100 local chapters in the U.S. and is active in six other countries.

== Biographies and critics ==
Biographical and critical works on Marianne Williamson and her work are numerous. Oumano (1992) published the first, and primarily positive biography on Williamson. Fisher (2021) published the first scholarly and journalistic analysis in an intellectual biography of Williamson, that brings out extensive critiques and recommendations for improving Williamson’s leadership style and approach to activist organizing and political campaigns. A critical discussion of Williamson’s approach to the presidential campaign and her philosophy in the context of politics appeared on the podcast called Integral Stage in 2023. There have been in recent years other, less extensive biographical works on Williamson.

== Books ==
- A Return to Love (1992, ISBN 978-0060927486)
- A Woman's Worth (1992, ISBN 978-0345386571)
- Illuminata: A Return to Prayer (1994, ISBN 978-1573225205)
- The Healing of America (1994, ISBN 9780684842707)
- Emma & Mommy Talk to God (1996, ISBN 978-0060799267)
- Enchanted Love: The Mystical Power of Intimate Relationships (1999, ISBN 978-0684870250)
- Imagine What America Could Be in the 21st Century: Visions of a Better Future from Leading American Thinkers (2000, ISBN 0451204697)
- Healing the Soul of America: Reclaiming Our Voices as Spiritual Citizens (2000, ISBN 978-0684846224)
- Everyday Grace: Having Hope, Finding Forgiveness, And Making Miracles (2002, ISBN 978-1573223515)
- The Gift of Change: Spiritual Guidance for Living Your Best Life (2004, ISBN 0060816112)
- A Course in Weight Loss: 21 Spiritual Lessons for Surrendering Your Weight Forever (2010, ISBN 1401921531)
- The Law of Divine Compensation: On Work, Money and Miracles (2014, ISBN 0062205412)
- Tears to Triumph: The Spiritual Journey from Suffering to Enlightenment (2016, ISBN 978-0062205445)
- A Politics of Love: A Handbook for a New American Revolution (2019, ISBN 0062873938)
- The Mystic Jesus: The Mind of Love (2023, ISBN 0062205471)
