= Helen Schucman =

American clinical and research psychologist (1909–1981)

Helen Cohn Schucman
- Born: Helen Dora Cohn; July 14, 1909; New York City, US
- Died: February 9, 1981 (aged 71); New York City, US
- Occupations: Professor of medical psychology, Columbia University
- Known for: A Course In Miracles (ACIM)
- Spouse: Louis Schucman

Helen Cohn Schucman (born Helen Dora Cohn, July 14, 1909 – February 9, 1981) was an American clinical psychologist and research psychologist. She was a professor of medical psychology at Columbia University in New York from 1958 until her retirement in 1976. Schucman is best known for having "scribed" with the help of colleague William Thetford the book A Course in Miracles (first edition, 1975), the contents of which she claimed had been given to her by an inner voice she identified as Jesus. At her request, her role as its "writer" was not revealed to the general public until after her death.

== Early life and education ==
Schucman was born Helen Dora Cohn in 1909 to Sigmund Cohn, a prosperous metallurgical chemist, and Rose Black, the daughter of a former rabbi from Germany. They married on October 18, 1896, in Manhattan, and Schucman had an elder brother, Adolph Cohn, who was almost 12 years her senior. Though her parents were both half-Jewish, they were non-observant. Schucman's mother Rose had an interest in Theosophy and various expressions of Christianity such as Christian Science and the Unity School of Christianity.

The family housekeeper, Idabel, a Baptist, had the deepest religious influence on Schucman while she was growing up. In 1921, when she was 12, Schucman visited Lourdes, France, where she had a spiritual experience, and in 1922 she was baptized as a Baptist. Later in life, she considered herself an atheist.

She received her B.A. from New York University, where she met fellow student Louis Schucman in 1932. They married in a 10-minute ceremony at a local rabbi's office, on May 26, 1933. Louis owned one or more bookstores on "Book Row" in Manhattan, and during the early years of their marriage Schucman worked at his main store. Growing restless in her early forties, she returned to NYU to study psychology. She received her M.A. in 1952, followed by her Ph.D. in 1957.

== Career ==
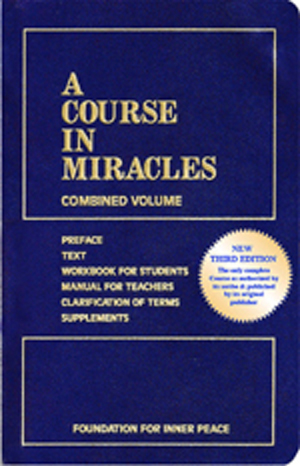
A Course In Miracles (ACIM) Combined Volume

Schucman was a clinical and research psychologist, who held the tenured position of Associate Professor of Medical Psychology at the Columbia University College of Physicians and Surgeons at the Columbia-Presbyterian Medical Center in New York City. During her tenure at Columbia University, Schucman worked with William Thetford, whom she first met in early 1958.

A Course in Miracles (ACIM) was "scribed" by Schucman between 1965 and 1972 through a process of inner dictation. She experienced the process as one of a distinct and clear dictation from an inner voice, which earlier had identified itself to her as Jesus. Her scribing of A Course in Miracles began with these words: "This is a course in miracles. Please take notes."

Wouter Hanegraaff distinguishes Schucman's process as a type of channeling that articulates revelation, clarifying that "in cases of inner dictation in which the medium hears a voice dictating messages, (s)he writes down [these messages] in a fully conscious state." Hanegraaff continues by specifically characterizing Schucman's case as spontaneous channeling, indicating that "[o]ver the years the voice proved to be remarkably consistent, stopping the dictation when interrupted [by Schucman's daily activities] and continuing at the next opportunity." Hanegraaff also references specific dialogue between Schucman and William Thetford, citing author Robert E. Skutch, among other authors, including Kenneth Wapnick, whom Hanegraaff cites as a good source for discussion of this subject.

During this time, Schucman worked in a collaborative venture with William Thetford in scribing A Course In Miracles (ACIM) and also with its initial edits. The main transcription process took seven years, from 1965 to 1972, during which she took notes in shorthand, then each day read these notes to Thetford, who typed them out while she read them. After all the ACIM material had been initially transcribed it was edited for publication by Schucman and the other two primary editors, Thetford and Wapnick.

Cover of Absence from Felicity, Schucman's only biography

Schucman also wrote two supplemental ACIM pamphlets by the same process as well as a collection of poetry later published as The Gifts of God. Following the transcription and editing, Schucman began to reduce the level of her direct involvement in ACIM and was never as heavily involved with teaching or popularizing the material as Thetford and Wapnick.

== Death ==
In 1980 Schucman was diagnosed with advanced pancreatic cancer. After a prolonged illness, she died of related complications at age 71 in 1981.

== Legacy ==
A collection of her poems, The Gifts of God, was posthumously published by the Foundation for Inner Peace.

Absence From Felicity: The Story of Helen Schucman and Her Scribing of A Course in Miracles is the only biography of Schucman. It was written by her longtime friend, Kenneth Wapnick.

Wapnick later founded the Foundation for A Course in Miracles (FACIM), an organization that claimed to hold a copyright to A Course In Miracles. Upon Wapnick's death in 2013, the purported copyright to A Course In Miracles reverted to the Foundation For Inner Peace (FIP).

== Writings ==
- Schucman, Helen (1960). Evaluating the educability of the severely mentally retarded child. American Psychological Association. OCLC 62427139.
- Schucman, Helen (June 1972). The Retarded Child from Birth to Five: A Multidisciplinary Program for the Child and Family. John Day Co. ISBN 978-0-381-98127-3. OCLC 303564.
- Schucman, Helen (1989). The Gifts of God. Berkeley: Celestial Arts. ISBN 0-89087-585-5. (contains 114 poems that share the spiritual content of the Course as well as the prose poem "The Gifts of God," which summarizes the teachings of the Course)
