= Agape International Spiritual Center =

New Thought congregation

The Agape International Spiritual Center is a transdenominational congregation currently holding Sunday services at the Saban Theatre in Beverly Hills, California, founded in 1986 by Michael Bernard Beckwith. Agape International Spiritual Center is the flagship location of the Agape Movement founded by Beckwith, an international New Thought belief community founded in the tradition of Religious Science, that has expanded into a trans-denominational international community, with members, spiritual practitioners, ministers and ministries across the globe, international live-streaming services, and its affiliate congregations, Agape East Spiritual Center, in Norfolk, Virginia; Agape Bay Area in Oakland, CA; and SoulCenterOC, in Irvine, CA.

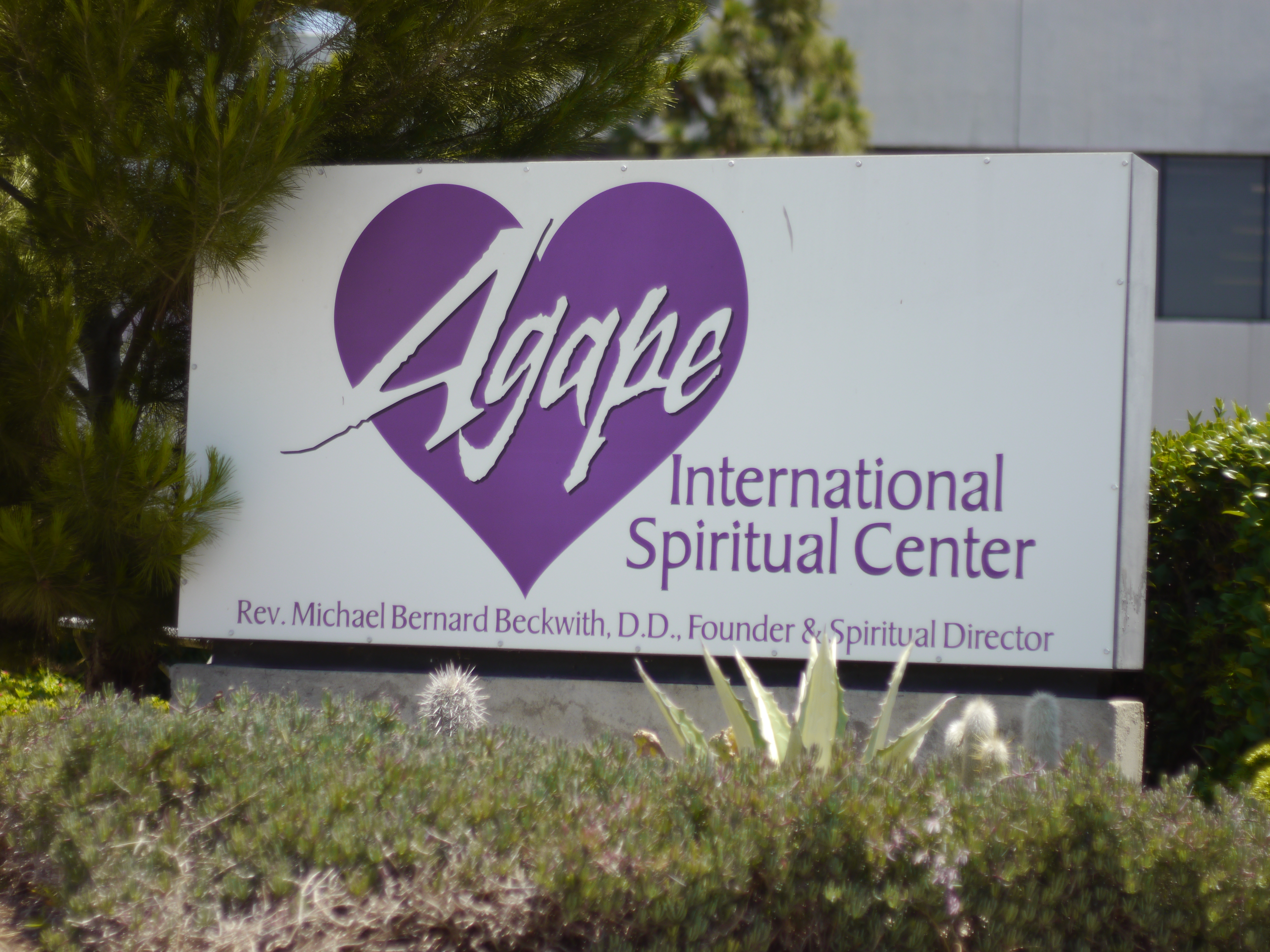
Agape International Spiritual Center

== See also ==
- Religious Science
