= Jean Houston =

American author and academic (1937–2026)

- Born: May 10, 1937; New York City, U.S.
- Died: May 16, 2026 (aged 89); Ashland, Oregon, U.S.
- Education: Barnard College
- Alma mater: Union Graduate School
- Occupations: Author, lecturer
- Spouse: Robert Masters (m. 1965; died 2008)
- Website: www.jeanhouston.com/Jean-Houston/

Jean Houston (May 10, 1937 – May 16, 2026) was an American author involved in the human potential movement. Along with her husband, Robert Masters, she co-founded the Foundation for Mind Research.

== Biography ==
=== Early life and education ===
Houston was born on May 10, 1937, in New York City, United States, to Mary Todaro Houston who was of Sicilian descent, and Jack Houston who was related to Sam Houston of Texas. Her father was a comedy writer who developed material for stage, television and the movies, including for comedians Bob Hope and George Burns. His work required him, and the family, to move frequently. After the breakup of her parents' marriage, she spent her teen years in New York City.

Houston attended Barnard College in New York City, then was enrolled in a Ph.D. program in psychology from Union Graduate School and a Ph.D. in religion from the Graduate Theological Foundation, but did not receive a degree.

=== Career ===
While participating in a US Government sanctioned research project on the effects of LSD, Houston became acquainted with Robert Masters, a writer and researcher into the varieties of human behavior and potentials. They married in 1965 and soon became known for their work in the human potential movement. Together they conducted research into the interdependence of body, mind, and spirit at the Foundation for Mind Research for 14 years.

The psychedelic experience research Houston and Masters conducted culminated in the 1966 publication of The Varieties of Psychedelic Experience. The U.S. government banned psychedelic research that same year. Their book on psychedelic studies detailed the expanded cognition and creativity participants experienced under the influence of LSD. After the research ban, Houston and Masters shifted their focus to exploring other ways of achieving altered states of consciousness without the use of drugs. Houston and Masters' 1972 book Mind Games detailed their findings that guided imagery and specific programs of bodily movement could reprogram the brain toward more integrated ways of experiencing the world. John Lennon called Mind Games "one of the two most important books of our time".

Houston taught at Marymount College, Tarrytown, from 1965 to 1972. She was a lecturer at Hunter College for less than a year in 1961. Her interest in anthropology brought about a close association with Margaret Mead, who lived with Houston and Masters for several years before her death in 1978.

In 1982, Houston began teaching a seminar based on the concept of "the ancient mystery schools". Houston explored the ancient idea of entelechy and proposed that individuals possess an innate potentiality which motivates their experience and actions. A technique she advocated for acknowledging and developing this inner spiritual self involved imagining the realization of one's potential in full embodied form in order to integrate it with one's present physical self.

=== Personal life ===
Houston married Robert Masters in 1965; they had no children, and he died in 2008. She died in Ashland, Oregon, on May 16, 2026, at the age of 89.

== Controversy ==
During the first term (1993–1997) of the Clinton administration, First Lady Hillary Clinton, while she was writing It Takes a Village (1996), invited Houston to work with her in the White House as an advisor. Houston facilitated a creative thinking, role-playing exercise wherein Clinton engaged in imaginary dialogues with Gandhi and Eleanor Roosevelt. Bob Woodward's book The Choice revealed this exercise publicly in 1996. After both the New York Post and the Daily News labeled Houston "Hillary's Guru" and the Boston Herald dubbed her the "First Lady's Spiritual Adviser", People magazine reported that Houston had "suddenly found herself the hapless butt of a thousand gags". Houston explained that "We were using an imaginative exercise to force her ideas, to think about how Eleanor would have responded to a particular problem." Houston said: "I have never been to a seance."

== Selected writings ==
- Mystical Dogs: Animals as Guides to our inner Life, Inner Ocean Publishing (2002), ISBN 1-930722-13-3
- Jump Time: Shaping Your Future in a World of Radical Change, Sentient Publications (2nd edn 2004), ISBN 1-59181-018-3
- The Passion of Isis and Osiris: A Union of Two Souls, Wellspring/Ballantine (1998), ISBN 0-345-42477-8
- A Mythic Life: Learning to Live our Greater Story, HarperSanFrancisco (1996), ISBN 0-06-250282-4
- Manual for the Peacemaker: An Iroquois Legend to Heal Self (with Margaret Rubin) Quest Books (1995), ISBN 0-8356-0709-7
- Public Like a Frog: Entering the Lives of three Great Americans, Quest Books (1993), ASIN B0026SIU0G
- The Hero and the Goddess: The "Odyssey" as Mystery and Initiation, Ballantine Books (1992), ISBN 0-345-36567-4
- Godseed: The Journey of Christ, Quest Books (1988), ISBN 0-8356-0677-5
- A Feminine Myth of Creation (with Diana Vandenberg, in Dutch), J.H. Gottmer (1988), ISBN 90-257-2118-4
- The Search for the Beloved: Journeys in Mythology and Sacred Psychology, Tarcher (2nd edn 1997), ISBN 0-87477-871-9
- The Possible Human: A Course in Extending Your Physical, Mental, and Creative Abilities, Tarcher (2nd edn 1997), ISBN 0-87477-872-7
- Life Force: The Psycho-Historical Recovery of the Self, Quest Books (2nd edn 1993), ISBN 0-8356-0687-2

=== With Robert Masters ===
- Mind Games, Doubleday (1972), ISBN 0-385-28650-3
- Listening to the Body: The Psychophysical Way to Health and Awareness, Delta (1979), ISBN 0-385-28577-9
- The Varieties of Psychedelic Experience, Park Street Press (2000 edn) (1966), ISBN 0-89281-897-2

== Film and television appearances ==
- "'Nightline' Face-Off: Does God Have a Future?", ABC Nightline program March 2010. With Deepak Chopra, Sam Harris, and Michael Shermer.
- Oprah and Jean Houston on the Hero's Journey Super Soul Sunday (OWN TV), November 2012.
