= Stillness Speaks =

Book by Eckhart Tolle

Stillness Speaks is a self-help book published in 2003 by the German author Eckhart Tolle.

== Overview ==
Unlike his works The Power of Now and A New Earth, which are written in continuous prose, Stillness Speaks is composed in a sutra-like style. This means the book consists of various verses on specific topics, which, according to the author, are meant to guide the reader step by step toward awareness. The verse format is seen as an advantage, as it does not "engage the thinking mind more than is necessary." The author wrote: “...just like the ancient sutras, the thoughts within this book don't say, 'Look at me', but 'Look beyond me'."

Eckhart Tolle's official website described the book as being designed to be read meditatively. It is "a mosaic of individual entries, concise and complete in themselves, but profoundly transformative when read as a whole.” The book offers readers “the essence of [Tolles] teaching in short, simple pieces that anyone can easily understand.”

I am not my thoughts, emotions, sensory perceptions, and experiences. I am not the content of my life. I am Life. I am the space in which all things happen. I am consciousness. I am the Now. I am.

— Eckhart Tolle, Stillness Speaks (2003), p. 59

== Content ==
=== Chapters ===
Introduction

1. Silence & Stillness
2. Beyond The Thinking Mind
3. The Egoic Self
4. The Now
5. Who You Truly Are
6. Acceptance & Surrender
7. Nature
8. Relationships
9. Death and the Eternal
10. Suffering and the End of Suffering

=== Quotes (Selection) ===
"The stream of thinking has enormous momentum that can easily drag you along with it. Every thought pretends that it matters so much. It wants to draw your attention in completely. Here is a new spiritual practice for you: Don't take your thoughts too seriously."

"Feel the energy of your inner body. Immediately mental noise slows down or ceases. Feel it in your hands, your feet, your abdomen, your chest. Feel the life that you are, the life that animates the body. The body then becomes a doorway, so to speak, into a deeper sense of aliveness underneath the fluctuating emotions and underneath your thinking."

"Do you treat this moment as if it were an obstacle to be overcome? Do you feel you have a future moment to get to that is more important? Almost everyone lives like this most of the time. Since the future never arrives, except as the present, it is a dysfunctional way to live. It generates a constant undercurrent of unease, tension, and discontent. It does not honor life, which is Now and never not Now."

"You cannot find yourself in the past or future. The only place where you can find yourself is in the Now. Spiritual seekers look for self-realization or enlightenment in the future. To be a seeker implies that you need the future. If this is what you believe, it becomes true for you: you will need time until you realize that you don't need time to be who you are."

"Unhappiness needs a mind-made "me" with a story, a conceptual identity. It needs time - past and future. When you remove time from your unhappiness, what is it that remains? The "suchness" of this moment remains. It may be a feeling of heaviness, agitation, tightness, anger, or even nausea. That is not unhappiness, and it is not a personal problem. There is nothing personal in human pain. It is simply an intense pressure or intense energy that you feel somewhere in the body. By giving it attention, the feeling doesn't turn into thinking and thus reactivate the unhappy "me". See what happens when you just allow a feeling to be."

"What a miserable day. He didn't have the decency to return my call. She let me down.

Little stories we tell ourselves and others, often in the form of complaints. They are unconsciously designed to enhance our always deficient sense of self through being "right" and making something or someone "wrong". Being "right" places us in a position of imagined superiority and so strengthens our false sense of self, the ego. This also creates some kind of enemy: Yes, the ego needs enemies to define its boundaries, and even the weather can serve that function. Through habitual mental judgment and emotional contraction, you have a personalized, reactive relationship to people and events in your life. These are all forms of self-created suffering, but they are not recognized as such because to the ego they are satisfying. The ego enhances itself through reactivity and conflict. How simple life would be without those stories.

It is raining. He did not call. I was there. She was not."

== Reception ==
The original English edition was first released on August 1, 2003, by New World Library.

Reviewers Frederic and Mary Ann Brussat described Stillness Speaks as a set of modern sutras on spiritual topics such as acceptance, surrender, relationships, and suffering. They emphasized that the book is both timeless and contemporary, possessing a transformative power. Compared to Tolle's other works, however, Stillness Speaks has received less attention from the broader public.

Actor Chris Evans once asked Eckhart Tolle a question on Oprah's Book Club and revealed that he has a tattoo featuring a quote from Stillness Speaks.
