= Patrick McDonnell =

American illustrator (born 1956)

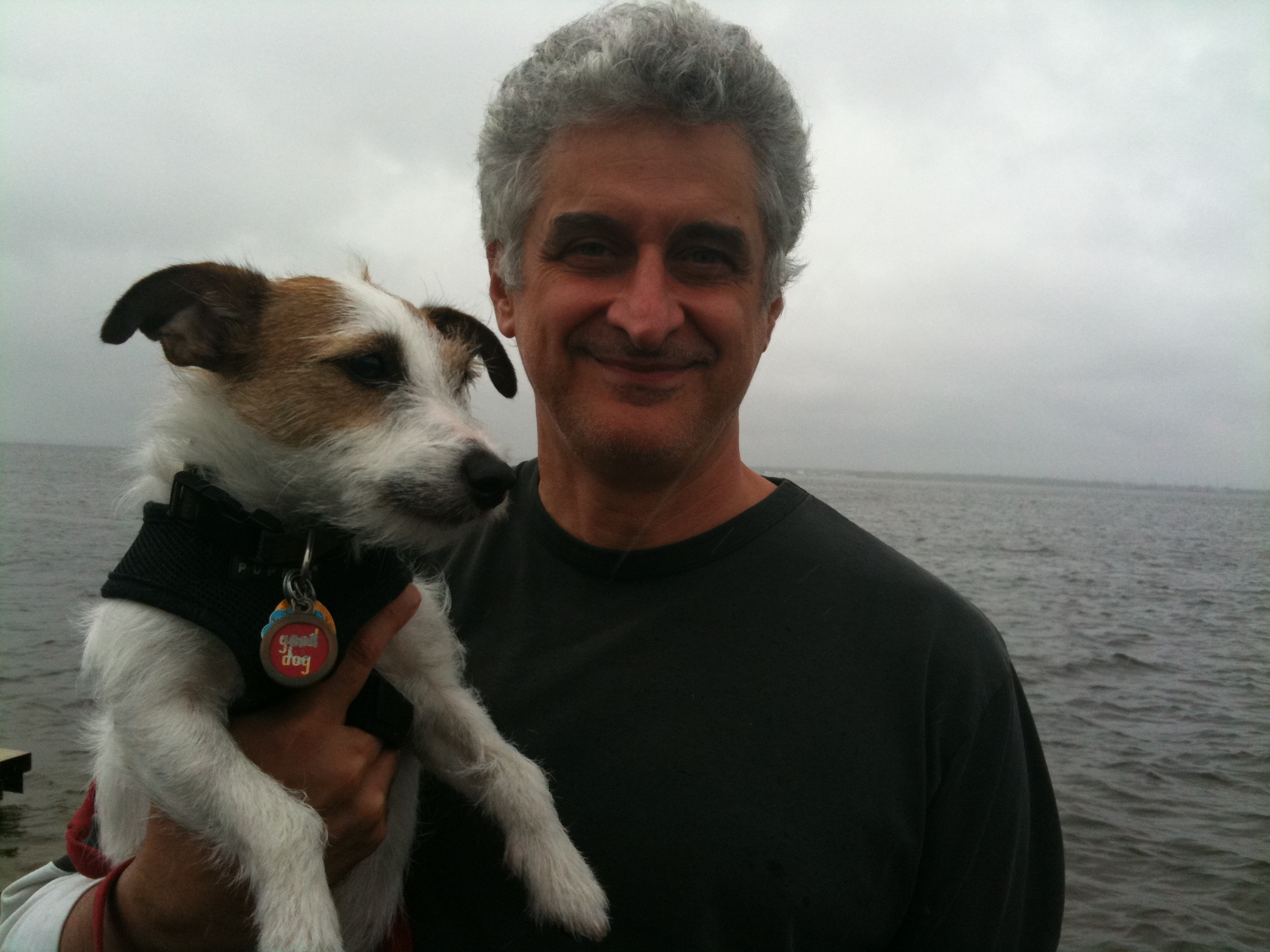
- Patrick McDonnell and his dog Amelie
- Born: March 17, 1956 (age 70) Elizabeth, New Jersey, U.S.
- Areas: Cartoonist, playwright, illustrator
- Notable works: Mutts
- Awards: Full list
- Spouse: Karen O'Connell (m. 1983)

Patrick McDonnell (born March 17, 1956) is a cartoonist, author, and playwright. He is the creator of the daily comic strip Mutts, which follows the adventures of a dog and a cat, that has been syndicated since 1994. Prior to creating Mutts, he was a prolific magazine illustrator, and would frequently include a dog in the backgrounds of his drawings.

McDonnell's picture book, The Gift of Nothing, was adapted as a musical for the Kennedy Center stage, as was his picture book about the childhood of Jane Goodall, Me . . . Jane, which won a Caldecott Honor in 2012. His work has been animated for television commercials, most notably a public service announcement for the NY Philharmonic. He is a co-author of Krazy Kat: The Comic Art of George Herriman, published in 1986 by Abrams Books.

McDonnell is involved with many animal and environmental charities. His characters have been used by the United States Marines, the American Library Association, and by the Humane Society of the United States. The Mutts characters appear on the New Jersey Animal Friendly license plates, which fund state pet population programs.

He won the Harvey Award for Best Comic Strip eight times, and has been given four National Cartoonists Society Awards.

== Early life ==
Patrick Luigi McDonnell was born in Elizabeth, New Jersey, the son of an Irish father and an Italian-American mother. Early artistic influences were Charles M. Schulz, George Herriman, and E. C. Segar. McDonnell was raised in Edison, New Jersey and, after graduating from Edison High School in 1974, he attended the School of Visual Arts (SVA) in New York on scholarship, graduating in 1978.

== Career ==
At SVA, McDonnell met a group of underground cartoonists, such as Peter Bagge and Kazimieras G. Prapuolenis (Kaz). It was also while matriculating at SVA that he designed the intertitles for characters on The Uncle Floyd Show which included Julia Stepchild, Don Ho-Hum, Flojo the TV Clown, and Don Goomba. His punk rock band Steel Tips would later be the first of many musical acts to perform on the show.

Moving to Hoboken, New Jersey, shortly after graduating, McDonnell had some of his earliest professional drawings published in The Village Voice, and as "Jerseyana" in New Jersey Monthly magazine. His first high-profile ongoing freelance work was providing illustrations for the Russell Baker Observer column for The New York Times Sunday Magazine from 1978 to 1993. His work on the Observer column got McDonnell interested in the idea of eventually doing a comic strip.

McDonnell created a monthly comic strip, Bad Baby, for Parents Magazine, which ran for ten years. The Bad Baby strips were collected and published by Ballantine Books in 1988. Bad Baby was adapted into an animated TV movie in 1997. During that time he also was a regular contributor to Sports Illustrated, Reader's Digest, Forbes, Time, and many other national magazines. McDonnell's illustrations for magazines, books, and greeting cards earned him two National Cartoonists Society Awards in 1991.

Mutts became syndicated, distributed by King Features Syndicate, starting in 1994. It won the Harvey Award for Best Comic Strip in 1997, 1999, 2001, 2002, and 2003. Peanuts creator Charles M. Schulz said of Mutts, "To me, MUTTS is exactly what a comic strip should be." A book of McDonnell's life and work, Mutts: The Comic Art of Patrick McDonnell, was published in 2003 by Abrams Books.

In 2003, McDonnell illustrated the front cover of Vivaldi's Greatest Hit: The Ultimate Four Seasons, an album containing Antonio Vivaldi's famous set of violin concerti and eleven cover versions of selected movements. The artwork features Earl the dog conducting a quartet of trees playing musical instruments, and Mooch the cat dancing to the music.

In 2005, McDonnell curated an exhibition — "Top Dogs: Comic Canines Before and After Snoopy" — at the Charles M. Schulz Museum in Santa Rosa, California.

In 2006, the Mutts characters were featured in the United States Marines' Toys for Tots holiday poster, and in 2007 were part of the American Library Association's "Read!" poster. The 2007-2008 Mazdaspeed Team featured Mutts-themed vehicles promoting pet adoption and the work of the Humane Society of the United States. He also created a set of "humane postage stamps" for the Humane Society.

In 2009 McDonnell collaborated with author Eckhart Tolle to create Guardians of Being, a philosophical book about nature and the present moment. In 2011, McDonnell's children's book Me... Jane was published. It is a story about naturalist Jane Goodall growing up and her awakening curiosity about the lives of animals around her. A sequence of Mutts strips led to Goodall's interest in working with McDonnell on the book. Me... Jane won a Caldecott Honor in 2012. In 2010, the Mutts comic strip was appearing in more than 700 newspapers across 20 countries.

== Personal life ==
McDonnell has been a vegetarian since around 1990 and a vegan since 2005. McDonnell is a member of the board of directors of the Humane Society of the United States, the Fund for Animals, and The Charles M. Schulz Museum.

McDonnell and his wife Karen O'Connell — whom he met in the late 1970s while both members of the punk band Steel Tips — reside in Princeton, New Jersey, with their dog Amelie, and their cat, Willie Lebowsky. Their Jack Russell Terrier, Earl, who was the inspiration and constant muse for the Mutts character of the same name, died in November 2007 after living with McDonnell for over 18 years.

== Awards ==
- Inkpot Award 2014.
- Helen Hayes Award for The Gift of Nothing musical (at The Kennedy Center) – Best Adaptation 2015
- Bob Clampett Humanitarian Award, 2011, given at the Eisner Awards
- PETA Humanitarian Award 2001
- National Cartoonists Society's Reuben Award for Cartoonist of the Year 1999
- National Cartoonists Society's Award for Comic Strip of the Year 1999
- National Cartoonists Society's Reuben Award (nominee) 1997 and 1998
- Germany's Max & Moritz Prize for Best International Comic Strip 1998
- Swedish Academy of Comic Art's Adamson Statuette 1997
- Harvey Award for Best Comic Strip (for Mutts) 1997, 1999, 2001, 2002, 2003, 2005, 2009, 2010
- Ark Trust Genesis Award 1997, 1999
- National Cartoonists Society Award for Greeting Cards 1991
- National Cartoonists Society Award for Magazine and Book Illustration 1991

== Bibliography ==
=== Mutts ===
==== Collections ====
- MUTTS (1996)
- Cats & Dogs (1997)
- More Shtuff (1998)
- Mutts Little Big Book (1998)
- MUTTS Sundays (1999) — large format, in color
- Yesh! (1999)
- Our MUTTS (2000)
- A Little Look-See (2001)
- Sunday Mornings: A MUTTS Treasury (2001) — large format, in color
- What Now (2002)
- I Want To Be The Kitty! (2003)
- Mutts: The Comic Art of Patrick McDonnell (2003)
- Dog-Eared (2004)
- Sunday Afternoons: A MUTTS Treasury (2004) — large format, in color
- Sunday Evenings: A MUTTS Treasury (2005) — large format, in color
- Who Let The Cat Out? (2005)
- Everyday MUTTS: A Comic Strip Treasury (2006) (Sundays in color)
- Animal Friendly: A MUTTS Treasury (2007) (Sundays in color)
- The Best of Mutts (2007) — retrospective
- Call of The Wild: A MUTTS Treasury (2008) (Sundays in color)
- Mutts: Shelter Stories: Love. Guaranteed. (2008) — collection of over 100 Shelter Stories comics accompanied by photos and vignettes of adopted pets
- Stop and Smell the Roses: A MUTTS Treasury (2009) (Sundays in color)
- Earl & Mooch: A MUTTS Treasury (2010) (Sundays in color)
- Our Little Kat King: A MUTTS Treasury (2011) (Sundays in color)
- Bonk!: A MUTTS Treasury (2012) (Sundays in color)
- Cat Crazy: A MUTTS Treasury (2013) (Sundays in color)
- Living the Dream: A MUTTS Treasury (2014) (Sundays in color)
- Playtime: A MUTTS Treasury (2015) (Sundays in color)
- Year of Yesh: A MUTTS Treasury (2016) (Sundays in color)
- #LoveMutts Treasury (2017) (Sundays in color)
- You Have Those Wild Eyes Again, Mooch: A New Mutts Treasury (2018) (Sundays in color)
- The Art of Nothing: 25 Years of MUTTS and the Art of Patrick McDonnell (Harry N. Abrams, 2019)
- Hot Dogs, Hot Cats: A Mutts Treasury (2020) (Sundays in color)
- MUTTS Moments (2021)
- Walking Home (2022)
- Treats (2024)

==== Mutts children's books ====
- The Gift of Nothing (2005) — New York Times bestseller
- Just Like Heaven: A Mutts Children's Book (2006)
- Hug Time (2007) — New York Times bestseller
- Wag! (2009)

=== Other children's books ===
- Art (2006)
- South (2008)
- Me . . . Jane (2011)
- The Monsters' Monster (2012)
- A Perfectly Messed-Up Story (2014)
- (written by Mac Barnett) The Skunk (Roaring Brook Press, 2015)
- Thank You and Good Night (2015)
- Tek: The Modern Cave Boy (2016)
- The Little Red Cat Who Ran Away and Learned His ABC's the Hard Way (2017)

=== Other ===
- Krazy Kat: The Comic Art of George Herriman (1986) (with Karen O'Connell and Georgia Riley de Havenon). New York: Harry N. Abrams, Inc. ISBN 0-8109-2313-0.
- Bad Baby (1988). New York: Ballantine (a Fawcett Columbine book) — collection of Bad Baby strips from Parent Magazine; foreword by Elizabeth Crow
- Guardians of Being (2009) (Words by Eckhart Tolle)
- (with poet Daniel Ladinsky) Darling I Love You: Poems from the Hearts of Our Glorious Mutts and All Our Animal Friends (2017)
- The Super Hero’s Journey (2023)
