= Creative visualization (New Age) =

New Age practice

Creative visualization is a term used by New Age, popular psychology, and self-help writers and teachers in two contexts.

Firstly, it is used by some to denote the practice of generating positive and pleasant visual mental imagery with intent to recover from physical sickness or disability and eliminate psychological pain. Secondly, it is used by others to signify the generation of autobiographical visual mental imagery, by which the participant envisions themselves in desired circumstances, commonly evoking prospective images that depict abundance of financial wealth, professional or vocational success and achievement, pervasive health, and persistent happiness.

== History ==
The use of the phrase "creative visualization" to denote the practice of visualizing idealized autobiographical mental imagery indicative of physical, psychological, social, and financial goals has remained one of many self-realization or self-actualization pursuits characteristic of popular psychology and the New Age since the personal development writer Shakti Gawain published a book entitled Creative Visualization in 1978.

The first line of the book reads "Creative Visualization is the technique of creating what you want in your life". The following opening paragraphs define imagination as the "creative energy of the universe", and introduces the book as a means by which to use the so-defined imagination to "create what you truly want — love, fulfillment, enjoyment, satisfying relationships, rewarding work, self-expression, health, beauty, prosperity, inner peace, and harmony."

Gawain's book popularized a premise derived from the New Thought movement that began during the nineteenth century, primarily in the United States and the United Kingdom. The premise is that individuals have a mind containing mental content, including thoughts, images, memories, and predictions, which become manifested through the experience of living.

Gawain's book focuses primarily on making changes to visual mental imagery, and attributes to it the capacity for hindering or facilitating an individual's potential, citing vivid anecdotal stories drawn from her experience and that of others to support her thesis.

Subsequent to the popularity of the book, the practice of creative visualization, as described by Gawain, remained a staple and stable feature within the New Age movement, self-help media, and popular psychology of the 1980s, 1990s, and first decade of the 21st century.

=== 21st century ===
The claim that thoughts and visual mental images are composed of a universal energy described by Gawain in 1978 as the "creative energy of the universe", which can be brought under volitional control by Creative Visualization was amplified and exaggerated twenty-eight years later by the writer and television producer, Rhonda Byrne.

According to advocates of New Thought, physical sickness and mental illness, as well as unfortunate circumstances, are the consequence of such mental content. Furthermore, they allege that when an individual controls, modifies, and regulates their mind and mental content, then material life and the experience of living alters accordingly, healing physical sickness, disability and psychological pain, and transforming destitution, indenture, and misery into wealth, autonomy, and happiness.

In 2006, Byrne made a film called The Secret, and compiled a subsequent book of the same name, which made significant claims for the potential human use of such an energy, and popularized a maxim called the Law of Attraction, originally proposed in 1906 by New Thought writer William Walker Atkinson, in his book Thought Vibration or the Law of Attraction in the Thought World.

Byrne's book and film The Secret, and its rendition of the Law of Attraction, asserted three claims. Firstly, that thoughts and other mental content, such as visual imagery, is composed of "pure energy". Secondly, that this is the same energy that permeates everyone, everything, and brings order to the universe. Thirdly, that this energy obeys the principle of 'like attracts like', such that if you think negative thoughts, or visualize unpleasant or undesirable images, the energy of which those thoughts and images are allegedly made will attract the material manifestation of what you think and visualize.

== Criticism ==
Byrne's inspiration for The Secret came from a book entitled The Science of Getting Rich, by writer Wallace D. Wattles, originally published in 1910. The assertions made in The Secret film and book have been widely criticized, sometimes scathingly, by a number of commentators, for implying that undesirable circumstances and conditions, such as poverty, physical pain and psychological pain, result exclusively from a failure to exercise control over the mind by successfully harnessing and directing a hypothetical universal energy, a concept upon which many New Age principles and practices rely.
