= Mutts (comic strip) =

Daily comic strip created by Patrick McDonnell in 1994

- Author: Patrick McDonnell
- Website: www.mutts.com
- Current status/schedule: Running
- Launch date: September 5, 1994; 31 years ago
- Syndicate(s): King Features Syndicate
- Publisher: Andrews McMeel Publishing
- Genre: Humor

Mutts is a daily comic strip created by Patrick McDonnell and launched on September 5, 1994. Distributed by King Features Syndicate, it follows the adventures of Earl, a dog, and Mooch, a cat. Earl and Mooch interact with each other, their human owners, as well as the animals around their neighborhood.

Mutts has received numerous awards internationally, both for comic strip excellence and for its themes of animal protection. Peanuts creator Charles Schulz praised Mutts, calling it "one of the best comic strips of all time."

== Characters and story ==
Earl and Mooch

The friendship of Mooch and Earl focuses on the differences between cats and dogs as human companions and as friends with each other: Earl is friendly, loves the company of his human companion, and likes to play outside; Mooch is often indifferent to his human companions, except when being fed, and prefers to stay inside or is often seen with Earl, his best friend. Both animals frequently express themselves through thought balloons when their owners are present.

=== Earl ===
Earl is an innocent black and white Jack Russell Terrier who lives with his human companion Ozzie, a bachelor. They love spending time together and taking frequent walks. Earl often howls in loneliness when Ozzie is away from home. Earl spends much of his free time with Mooch, either inside or wandering around town visiting other animals. He loves to eat both human food and his own dog food. It is revealed in a 2011 Valentine's Day strip that Earl was adopted by Ozzie from a shelter. Earl was inspired by Patrick McDonnell's late Jack Russell terrier, also named Earl, who lived with Patrick and his wife for more than 18 years.

=== Mooch ===
Mooch is a curious tuxedo cat with a large nose who lives next door to Earl with his human companions Millie (who often calls him "Moochie," "Moo Moo Cakes," or "Shmoochums," and he calls her "Shmillie") and Frank, a goldfish named Sid, and a snail named Little Earl. Mooch can be reclusive, sometimes preferring to stay inside and nap, or play with his Little Pink Sock, rather than go outside with Earl. He has a speech impediment that causes him to insert an sh into words, such as yesh (yes), shmilk (milk) and shmousie (mousie). He frequently snubs (or shnubs) his cat food, much to Millie's chagrin, dislikes car rides, and, like Earl, eats human food at every opportunity.

=== Appearances in other media ===
In 2003, Earl and Mooch were included in McDonnell's illustration for the front cover of the album Vivaldi's Greatest Hit: The Ultimate Four Seasons, the dog conducting a quartet of trees playing musical instruments and the cat dancing to the music.

In 2005, Earl and Mooch appeared as guests in Blondie and Dagwood's 75th anniversary in the comic strip Blondie. In 2004, Pearls Before Swine crossed over with Mutts. In that strip, Rat goes to Comics Re-education Camp, where Earl and Mooch try to teach Rat to be a lovable comic strip character. In another strip, Frank and Mooch are hanging out with many old comic strip characters, including Dick Tracy, Peanuts, and Little Nemo.

== Other characters ==
=== Humans ===
- Ozzie – The beloved guardian of Earl, a 30-something bachelor
- Millie – The doting guardian of Mooch, married to Frank
- Frank – The cantankerous and sometimes reluctant caretaker of Mooch, married to Millie
- Butchie – Owner of Fatty Snax Deli, who tries to stop Mooch and Earl from eating his food. Formerly a butcher, Butchie became a vegan in June 2020, and re-opened his deli with a vegan menu.
- Doozy – The chipper and youthful friend to all animals, but especially fond of Guard Dog
- Bushy – Doozy's best friend and a hero to Tom-Tom
- Ms. Lulu – The pet psychic
- Sourpuss's Owner – Sourpuss's owner and a friend of Millie's

=== Animals ===
- Bip and Bop – Two squirrels who like bonking ground-dwellers in the head with acorns (described as antagonists of the strip)
- Crabby – An unhappy crab who speaks with frequent "salty" language (denoted by stars and typographical symbols); he claims to have gone on many adventures, such as on a pirate ship, inside a whale, and even meeting the Popeye cast
- Sparky (formerly Guard Dog) – A tough-looking, tethered dog with a soft heart. Sparky's mission is to remind humans that it's wrong to perpetually chain a dog. He was finally untethered in a November-December 2023 storyline after being abandoned by his previous owner and saved by Earl, Mooch, Ozzie, Doozy and her mother. Doozy adopted Guard Dog who was renamed Sparky, McDonnell's homage to Charles M. Schulz.
- King Crab – The crabbiest of them all, ruler of all he sees (since he is at the bottom of the ocean, however, he cannot see anything)
- Lollipop – Crabby's soft-shell wife
- McGarry – A bird who lives at the shore and tries to convince Crabby not to swear
- Mussels Marinara – A mussel that's always talking about its muscles, Crabby's buddy
- Noodles – A street-smart alley cat with a heart of gold, and friend and mentor of Shtinky's
- Philippe – A bird always wooing his love, Phoebe
- Shnelly – The house cat for whose love Mooch and Noodles fight; only the tip of her ears are seen through her owner's window
- Shtinky Puddin' (A.K.A. Jules) – A little kitten with a short memory and formerly the pet of a very wealthy human companion, he wants to save the world and often speaks out about animal rights, especially saving the tigers
- Sid – A fish who lives in a goldfish bowl in Mooch's house, and wishes to be free
- Little Earl (a.k.a. "Speed-o") – Mooch's pet snail obsessed with "walking" Mooch
- Sourpuss – A cranky cat who hates Mondays and can usually be found hiding under the couch or standing on the porch of his house, complaining
- Woofie – The big, happy, energetic dog that "wuvs" everything and everyone, especially Mooch, who does not appreciate the "wuv"
- Chippy and Monk – Two chipmunks, who are sarcastic and spunky members of the Mutts book club
- Lamont – A groundhog, featured in Groundhog Day strips
- Moe – A mole, stand-in for Lamont; he does not work Sundays
- Robert – A bird, friend of Earl and Mooch
- Wuzzy – A bear who Mooch tries to hibernate with in the winter
- Loretta – A squirrel who is the "wife" of Bip and Bop
- Shmousie – A mouse who Mooch (and sometimes Earl) try to get out of his hole so they can catch him

== Recurring storylines ==
From time to time there are special sets of daily comic strips. Some, such as Shelter Stories (which focus on animals in shelters), serve to remind readers about one of the key beliefs that Mutts holds dear: compassion for all animals. Others, such as Animal Idol (a parody of American Idol), are an homage to various pop culture references. One set of strips was a nod to The Big Lebowski, featuring Mooch as the Dude, with different characters quoting lines from other characters from the film.

Other storylines are set around the time of year. Each summer, Earl, Mooch, and their families visit the Jersey Shore, where they are joined by Crabby, Mussels Marinara, and McGarry. Mooch often finds himself hosting the Mutts Book Club in the fall, where he sits on a rock and reads books to Chippy and Monk. In the winter, Mooch and Earl often try to hibernate for the season. Around holidays such as Valentine's Day, Thanksgiving, and Christmas and during the change from one season to the next, the characters are often featured alongside a famous and poignant quote. On Groundhog Day, Lamont talks to Earl and Mooch about seeing his shadow or not. And during Farm Animal Awareness Week, Earl and Mooch often visit a farm animal sanctuary.

Additionally, there are recurring storylines that are not timebound. For instance, from time to time, Mooch drapes a towel over his head and delivers oracles or answers to the chipmunks' questions as The Shphinx. In other strips, Mooch dons a wizard's hat and performs magic, often including seeing the future or time traveling. Squirrels Bip and Bop embark on their campaign of bonking ground-dwellers' heads with nuts. Mooch can be found playing with his beloved Little Pink Sock. Every so often, the characters will encounter lifelike drawings of animals, often when they travel in their dreams to distant locations. Occasionally, Mooch can be seen driving Doozy's electric car.

== Animal welfare and animal rights ==
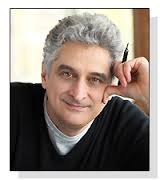
Patrick McDonnell, the creator of Mutts

On occasion, McDonnell devotes the strip for a week or more to animal welfare issues, especially the adoption of pets from animal shelters. Themes include Farm Animal Awareness Week and Shelter Stories, where pet adoption as well as pet shelter life is the key focus. In the sixth episode of Shelter Me, a PBS series presented by the Petco Foundation, McDonnell visited Animal Care Centers of NYC to inspire a series of Shelter Stories to share with MUTTS readers. McDonnell has also produced several short animated public service announcements advocating animal adoption from shelters. One week included a reference to the Sea Shepherd Conservation Society.

McDonnell also created artwork for the second generation New Jersey Animal Friendly specialty license plate, first issued in 2001. A portion of the revenue from the plates goes to the New Jersey Department of Health's Animal Population Control Program.

Additionally, McDonnell speaks out (usually using character Shtinky Puddin') about numerous animal rights causes, including seal clubbing, whale hunting, and the cause closest to Shtinky's hearts, saving the tigers. Additionally, McDonnell occasionally features Guard Dog, a tough-looking but tender-hearted dog who is chained in his yard. Supported by many animal welfare groups, Guard Dog serves as a symbol for all chained dogs, to remind people that no dog should have to live that way. McDonnell promised his readers that one day Guard Dog would be freed from his chains in the comic strip, though he already runs free in McDonnell's sketchbooks. In November 2023, McDonnell wrote a storyline where Guard Dog's owners move away without him, forcing the other characters to free him so can receive medical treatment. After being freed, Guard Dog is renamed Sparky.

Many strips over the years have been devoted to Dr. Jane Goodall and her numerous contributions to animal conservancy throughout her lifetime. Some feature quotes from Dr. Goodall, while others feature Shtinky and other Mutts characters on their quest to meet, observe, and learn from Dr. Goodall.

== Sunday title panels ==
Sunday strips are in color and their title panels are sometimes a tribute to a famous comic strip, a work of art, or another subject, including Flash #1, Dalí's The Persistence of Memory, Elvis Presley, Trout Mask Replica, and Magritte's Golconda.

== Setting ==
Mutts is set in New Jersey, where McDonnell grew up and still resides. The characters go down to the Jersey Shore each summer for vacation.

== Mutts books ==
=== Annual collections ===
Black-and-white reproductions of full year's strips (until 2005).

1. MUTTS (July 1996) ISBN 978-0-8362-1025-5
2. Cats & Dogs (October 1997) ISBN 978-0-8362-3732-0
3. More Shtuff (September 1998) ISBN 978-0-8362-6823-2
4. Yesh! (April 1999) ISBN 978-0-8362-8286-3
5. Our MUTTS (August 2000) ISBN 978-0-7407-0456-7
6. A Little Look-See (April 2001) ISBN 978-0-7407-1394-1
7. What Now (September 2002) ISBN 978-0-7407-2321-6
8. I Want to Be the Kitty! (April 2003) ISBN 978-0-7407-6197-3
9. Dog-Eared (September 2004) ISBN 978-0-7407-4740-3
10. Who Let the Cat Out? (April 2005) ISBN 978-0-7407-5006-9

=== Sundays collections ===
Large-format color reproductions of Sunday strips (until 2005).

1. MUTTS Sundays (September 1999) ISBN 978-0-7407-0010-1
2. Sunday Mornings (August 2001) ISBN 978-0-7407-1853-3
3. Sunday Afternoons (April 2004) ISBN 978-0-7407-4141-8
4. Sunday Evenings (September 2005) ISBN 978-0-7407-5535-4

=== Treasury collections ===
Large-format, dailies in black-and-white, Sunday in color (after 2005).

1. Everyday MUTTS: A Comic Strip Treasury (September 2006) ISBN 978-0-7407-6197-3
2. Animal Friendly: A MUTTS Treasury (May 2007) ISBN 978-0-7407-6556-8
3. Call of the Wild: A MUTTS Treasury (August 2008) ISBN 978-0-7407-7099-9
4. Stop and Smell the Roses (March 2009) ISBN 978-0-7407-8146-9
5. Earl and Mooch (September 2010) ISBN 978-0-7407-9768-2
6. Our Little Kat King (October 2011) ISBN 978-1-4494-0800-8
7. BONK!: A MUTTS Treasury (October 2012) ISBN 978-1-4494-2308-7
8. Cat Crazy: A MUTTS Treasury (October 2013) ISBN 978-1-4494-3725-1
9. Living the Dream: A MUTTS Treasury (November 2014) ISBN 978-1-4494-5869-0
10. Playtime: A MUTTS Treasury (November 2015) ISBN 978-1-4494-6302-1
11. Year of Yesh: A MUTTS Treasury (November 2016) ISBN 978-1-4494-8010-3
12. #LoveMutts: A MUTTS Treasury (November 2017) ISBN 978-1-4494-8513-9
13. You Have Those Wild Eyes Again, Mooch: A New MUTTS Treasury (October 2018) ISBN 978-1-4494-9524-4
14. Hot Dogs, Hot Cats: A New MUTTS Treasury (March 2020) ISBN 978-1-5248-5228-3
15. MUTTS Moments (November 2021) ISBN 978-1-5248-6978-6
16. Walking Home (October 2022) ISBN 978-1-5248-7803-0
17. Treats (March 2024) ISBN 978-1-5248-8093-4
18. The Little Things (July 2025)
19. You and Me (April 2026)

=== Miscellaneous ===
1. MUTTS Little Big Book (1998) ISBN 978-0-8362-6980-2
2. MUTTS: The Comic Art of Patrick McDonnell (2003) ISBN 978-0-8109-4616-3 (retrospective)
3. The Gift of Nothing (2005) ISBN 978-0-316-11488-2
4. MUTTS: Just Like Heaven (2005) ISBN 978-0-316-11493-6
5. Hug Time (2007) ISBN 978-0-316-11494-3
6. The Best of MUTTS (2007) ISBN 978-0-7407-6844-6
7. Shelter Stories: Love. Guaranteed. (2008) ISBN 978-1449483203
8. South (2008) ISBN 978-0316005098
9. A Shtinky Little Christmas ISBN 978-1449423070
10. Wag! (2009) ISBN 978-0316045483
11. Guardians of Being by Eckhart Tolle, illustrated by Patrick McDonnell (2009) ISBN 978-1608681198
12. The MUTTS Diaries (2014) ISBN 978-1449458706
13. The MUTTS Winter Diaries (2015) ISBN 978-1449470777
14. The MUTTS Autumn Diaries (2016) ISBN 978-1449480110
15. The Little Gift of Nothing (2016) ISBN 978-0316394734
16. Darling, I Love You: Poems from the Hearts of Our Glorious Mutts and All Our Animal Friends by Daniel Ladinsky, illustrated by Patrick McDonnell (2017) ISBN 978-0143128267
17. The MUTTS Spring Diaries (2018) ISBN 978-1449485146
18. The MUTTS Summer Diaries (2019) ISBN 978-1449470777
19. The Art of Nothing: 25 Years of MUTTS and the Art of Patrick McDonnell (2019) ISBN 978-1419736766
20. MUTTS Go Green (2021) ISBN 978-1524866945

== Mutts in other languages ==
- Iceland: Kjölturakkar ("lap animals")
- Denmark: Mis Og Fister
- Sweden: Morrgan & Klös
- Norway: Pels og poter ("fur and paws")
- Finland: Kamut ("pals")
- Austria: Milou & Filou
- Brazil: Os Vira-Latas ("the stray dogs" or "the Mutts")
- Estonian: Krantsid ("dogs")
- France: Earl & Mooch
- German: Mutts - Tiere sind auch nur Menschen ("animals are just people, too")

== The Gift of Nothing ==
Patrick McDonnell's beloved picture book, The Gift of Nothing, features Mutts characters Mooch, the cat, as he seeks the perfect gift for his dear friend Earl, the dog. Released in October 2005, the book quickly became a New York Times bestseller. In 2014, it was adapted as a musical for the Kennedy Center in Washington D.C., where it won a Helen Hayes Award for Outstanding Play or Musical Adaptation. Then in 2016, it was adapted into a board book called The Little Gift of Nothing. The book also inspired The Gift of Nothing Day, a holiday that was first celebrated in December 2017 and is recognized yearly, around the world, on or around December 15. On Gift of Nothing Day, participants are encouraged to gift someone the experience of spending quality time together and sharing love with one another.

== Guardians of Being: Spiritual Teachings from Our Dogs and Cats ==
In 2009, the book Guardians of Being: Spiritual Teachings From Our Dogs and Cats was released, written by Eckhart Tolle and illustrated by Patrick McDonnell. The book features images of Mutts characters joined with quotes and insights from Eckhart Tolle. The book aims to teach readers to find inner peace by living in the now, just as our companion animals do, to transform our consciousness and arise as more enlightened versions of ourselves. It highlights that while we humans are lost in our thoughts and the busy nature of everyday life, our pets become the key to the present moment — our guardians of being.

== Darling, I Love You: Poems from the Hearts of Our Glorious Mutts and All Our Animal Friends ==
The book Darling, I Love You: Poems from the Hearts of Our Glorious Mutts and All Our Animal Friends is a collection of poetry from Daniel Ladinsky paired with illustrations from Patrick McDonnell. This book, released in 2017 honors the special bond between animals and their human companions. McDonnell happened upon Ladinsky's work in a bookstore and was inspired to illustrate a selection of poems. McDonnell sent some examples to Ladinsky and the pair decided to collaborate on the book, in which Ladinsky wrote new poems based on the Mutts characters in addition to his other works.

== Cancelled film ==
In July 2011, it was reported that 20th Century Fox Animation and Blue Sky Studios were developing a feature-length animated film based on the Mutts comic. Patrick McDonnell and his brother Robert McDonnell were hired to write the script, while Patrick would also executive produce. In late 2014, Patrick delivered the final draft of the film script, which was then, according to him, on a drawing board. Blue Sky was closed in April 2021, ending development on the film.
