= Guardians of Being =

2009 picture book by Eckhart Tolle

- Author: Eckhart Tolle
- Illustrator: Patrick McDonnell
- Cover artist: Patrick McDonnell
- Language: English
- Genre: Picture Book
- Publisher: New World Library
- Publication place: United States
- Media type: Print and pictures
- Pages: 128
- ISBN: 978-1-57731-671-8
- Dewey Decimal: 204/.4 22
- LC Class: BL624 .T633 2009

Guardians of Being is a picture book written by Eckhart Tolle, and illustrated by Patrick McDonnell.

== Content ==
Eckhart's official website describes the book as conveying "a profound love of nature, of animals, of humans, of all life-forms [and] celebrates and reminds us of ... the wonder and joy to be found in the present moment, amid the beauty we sometimes forget to notice all around us".

The book was illustrated by Patrick McDonnell, the artist for the comic strip Mutts.

== Reception ==
Ken MacQueen at Macleans.ca described it as his "thinnest, but perhaps most accessible work, [distilling] Tolle’s teachings into fewer than 1,000 words." Nick DiMartino at Shelf-Awareness.com said "forgive the book its pretentious, silly name. Otherwise, it's... a gem of a book about the role animals have in our spiritual and mental lives."
