= The Power of Now =

Book by Eckhart Tolle

The Power of Now: A Guide to Spiritual Enlightenment
- First edition
- Author: Eckhart Tolle
- Language: English
- Subject: Spirituality, Psychology, self help
- Published: 1997 (Namaste Publishing); 1999 (New World Library)
- Media type: Print
- Pages: 236
- ISBN: 978-1-57731-152-2
- OCLC: 42061039
- Dewey Decimal: 291.4/4 21
- LC Class: BL624 .T64 1999

The Power of Now: A Guide to Spiritual Enlightenment is a book by Eckhart Tolle. It is a discussion about how people interact with themselves and others. The concept of self-reflection and presence in the moment are presented along with simple exercises for the achievement of its principles. Published in 1997, the book was recommended by Oprah Winfrey and has been translated into 33 languages. As of 2025, the book has sold 16 million copies worldwide.

== Philosophical outlook ==
The book draws from a variety of spiritual traditions, and one reviewer described it as "Buddhism mixed with mysticism and a few references to Jesus Christ, a sort of New Age re-working of Zen." It uses these traditions to describe a "belief system based on living in the present moment". Its core message is that people's emotional problems are rooted in their identification with their minds. The author writes that an individual should be aware of their present moment instead of losing themselves in worry and anxiety about the past or future.

According to the book, only the present moment is real and only the present moment matters, and both an individual's past and future are created by their thoughts. The author maintains that people's insistence that they have control of their life is an illusion "that only brings pain". The book also describes methods of relaxation and meditation to help readers anchor themselves in the present. These suggestions include slowing down by avoiding multi-tasking, spending time in nature, and letting go of worries about the future. Some of the concepts contained in The Power of Now, such as the human ego and its negative effects on happiness, are further elaborated in the author's later books, especially A New Earth: Awakening to Your Life's Purpose (2005).

== Selected chapters ==
The chapters of the book are:

1. "Introduction"
2. "You Are Not Your Mind"
3. "Consciousness: The Way Out of Pain"
4. "Moving Deeply into the Now"
5. "Mind Strategies for Avoiding the Now"
6. "The State of Presence"
7. "The Inner Body"
8. "Portals into the Unmanifested"
9. "Enlightened Relationships"
10. "Beyond Happiness and Unhappiness There Is Peace"
11. "The Meaning of Surrender".

Various chapters emphasize the philosophy of dismantling the harmful dominance of the mind and ego in an effort to overcome the "pain-body" (see Chapter Two). According to the author, his philosophy is directed towards people and their search for personal happiness and also has the potential to give insight into historical disasters like the justification of what he sees as the evil of capitalism.

=== Introduction ===
In the book's introduction the author relates his past experiences of continuous anxiety with periods of suicidal depression. Later, when he was 29 years old, he had a personal epiphany and writes: "I heard the words 'resist nothing' as if spoken inside my chest." He relates that he felt as if he were falling into a void and afterwards "there was no more fear."

=== Chapter One: "You are not your mind" ===
Tolle distinguishes between a person's thoughts, described as a “voice in the head” and the person's true self. He explains that this "thought-voice" should be recognized as separate from one's authentic self (this is evident because the real self is aware of the voice's presence). He argues that this voice - 'the thinker' - is generally a destructive influence and should be listened to impartially, not judged. Tolle further argues that people are not their thoughts, but rather 'the watcher' - the presence that recognizes thoughts. He claims the same applies to emotions.

The author further writes: "Enlightenment means rising above thought, not falling back to a level below it, to the level of plants and animals. In the enlightened state, you still use your thinking mind when needed, but in a much more focused and effective way than before. You use it mostly for practical purposes, but you are free of the involuntary internal dialogue, and there is inner stillness."

Tolle asserts: "The mind is a superb instrument if used rightly. Used wrongly, however, it becomes very destructive. To put it more accurately, it is not so much that you use your mind wrongly - you usually don't use it at all. It uses you. This is the disease. You believe that you are your mind. This is the delusion. The instrument has taken you over."

The author goes on to write that "pain is inevitable as long as you are identified with your mind" and that "many people live with a tormentor in their head that continuously attacks and punishes them and drains them of vital energy. It is the cause of untold misery and unhappiness, as well as of disease."

=== Chapter Two: "Consciousness: The Way Out of Pain" ===
In Chapter Two, Tolle tells the reader that they must recognize their personal ego "without the ego creating an antagonistic response to its own denial or destruction" and explains the purposelessness of the "mental pain and anguish" that people hold on to.

The concept of the "pain-body" is explained by Tolle as follows: "As long as you are unable to access the power of the Now, every emotional pain that you experience leaves behind a residue of pain that lives on in you. It merges with the pain from the past, which was already there, and becomes lodged in your mind and body". The resulting negative energy field is said to be the pain-body. According to the book: "The pain-body consists of trapped life-energy that has split off from your total energy field and has temporarily become autonomous through the unnatural process of mind identification."

The pain-body could, for example, express itself as resentment, impatience, a dark mood, a desire to harm, as rage or as depression. The pain-body lives on the fact that we identify with it. Tolle believes that if we observe the pain-body, it can no longer control our thinking.

In this chapter the author writes: "Pain can only feed on pain. Pain cannot feed on joy. It finds it quite indigestible".

=== Chapter Three: "Moving Deeply Into the Now" ===
In Chapter Three, the author writes: "In the normal, mind-identified or unenlightened state of consciousness, the power and creative potential that lie concealed in the Now are completely obscured by psychological time. You cannot find yourself by going into the past. You can find yourself by coming into the present. Life is now. There was never a time when your life was not now, nor will there ever be."

=== Chapter Four: "Mind Strategies for Avoiding the Now" ===
In Chapter Four, Tolle says that "tomorrow's bills are not the problem" and can be a "core delusion" that changes a "mere situation, event or emotion" into a reason for suffering and unhappiness. The book also calls "waiting" a "state of mind" that we should snap ourselves out of.

According to Tolle, there are three ways to deal with a situation. "If you find your here and now intolerable and it makes you unhappy...: remove yourself from the situation, change it, or accept it totally". In this way, there would be no "psychic pollution".

=== Later chapters ===
In the later chapters, the author writes about a wide range of topics and explains them from his perspective.

Tolle alleges that everyone has access to a field of pulsating aliveness and natural goodness that he calls the "inner body". The inner body is said to be covered up by excessive mental activity, mind identification and remnants of old emotional pain that first must be dissolved before gaining access to it.

For a conscious, awakened person, all drama would end, including in relationships. Life cycles and impermanence are also discussed; there are times of creativity and energy, and times of letting go and rest.

At the same time, Tolle addresses the difference between men and women in the awakening process. Women are said to be closer to awakening than men, because they are less trapped in their minds. This, he argues, is the reason for the historical suppression of the feminine. Tolle also writes that the greatest spiritual challenge differs for men and women: “As a general rule, the major obstacle for men tends to be the thinking mind, and the major obstacle for women the pain-body, although in certain individual cases the opposite may be true, and in others the two factors may be equal.”

== Reception ==
The book was originally published in 1997 by Namaste Publishing in Vancouver. It was republished in 1999 by New World Library, and this edition reached and remained on the New York Times bestseller list for years afterwards. The book has been translated into 33 languages, including Arabic.

In 2000, the book was listed as recommended reading in Oprah Winfrey's O magazine and, according to Winfrey, the actress Meg Ryan also recommended it. A Christian author, Andrew Ryder, wrote a dissertation saying that "Tolle moves the traditional [Christian] teaching forward by illustrating how our obsession with the past and the future ... [prevents] us from giving our full attention to the present moment." William Bloom, a spokesperson for the holistic, mind-body-spirit movement in the UK, wrote that "Tolle's approach is very body aware. He's done it in a nice accessible way for people."

Some reviewers were more critical of the book. According to a review in the Telegraph Herald, the book is not very well-written but contains some good teachings. Andrea Sachs wrote in Time magazine that the book is "awash in spiritual mumbo jumbo" and "unhelpful for those looking for practical advice". An article in The Independent said that "there is not very much new about The Power of Now" and described it as "a sort of New Age re-working of Zen."

=== By celebrities and in popular culture ===
When Paris Hilton was incarcerated at the Century Regional Detention Facility in California in June 2007 she brought with her a copy of The Power of Now. Singer Annie Lennox chose The Power of Now as one of her "desert island books".

Actress Gwyneth Paltrow listened to the audiobook of The Power of Now and described herself as an "early adopter". Actress Gillian Anderson chose The Power of Now as her second book—alongside the Bible—on a BBC radio show. Actor Jeff Goldblum is a fan of Tolle and The Power of Now is one of his favorite books.

Singer Katy Perry stated that she was inspired to write "This Moment", a song from her 2013 album Prism, after she heard the audiobook of The Power of Now.

In Ruben Fleischer's superhero film Venom (2018), a copy of Tolle's book The Power of Now can be seen on the nightstand of the main character, Eddie Brock (played by Tom Hardy). He listens to the audiobook to meditate after being infected by the titular symbiote.

Kendrick Lamar references this book throughout his 2022 album Mr Morale & The Big Steppers.

== See also ==
- Autobiography of a Yogi
- Mindfulness
- Satipatthana
- Be Here Now
