= Steve Taylor (psychologist) =

English author and lecturer (born 1967)

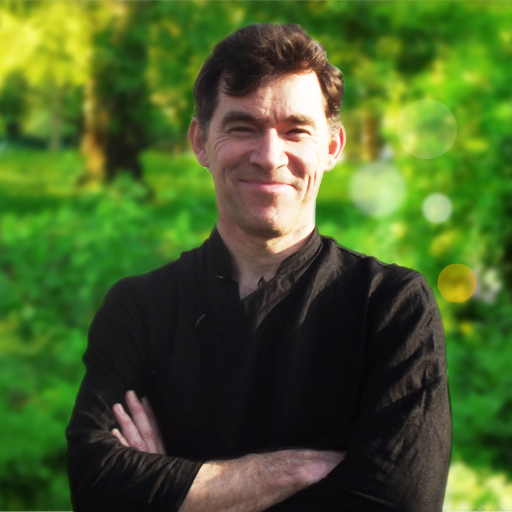
- Born: 1967 (age 58–59)
- Occupations: Author; lecturer
- Writing career
- Subject: Transpersonal psychology
- Website: www.stevenmtaylor.com

Steve Taylor (born 1967) is an English author, lecturer and researcher in psychology, who has written many books on psychology and spirituality, as well as books of poetry. He is a senior lecturer in psychology at Leeds Beckett University and has been the chair of the Transpersonal Psychology Section of the British Psychological Society.

Taylor has a master's degree with distinction in Consciousness and Transpersonal Psychology and a PhD in Psychology from Liverpool John Moores University. He writes the popular blog Out of the Darkness for Psychology Today magazine, and has also written blog articles for Scientific American. He also regularly writes for The Conversation and for The Psychologist magazine.

== Career ==
Taylor taught courses on personal development at the University of Manchester and did his PhD research at Liverpool John Moores University.

Taylor's books have been published in 20 languages, while his articles and essays have been published in many academic journals and in the popular media, including The Journal of Humanistic Psychology, the Journal of Transpersonal Psychology, The Journal of Consciousness Studies, Psychologies, Resurgence, The Psychologist and The Daily Express. His work has been featured widely in the media in the UK, including on BBC Breakfast, BBC World TV, Radio 4 and 5, and in The Guardian and The Independent. He is a regular presenter of Prayer for the Day on Radio 4, despite not being religious himself. His work has been described by Eckhart Tolle as "an important contribution to the shift in consciousness which is happening on our planet at present."

Taylor has been included in the list of the "100 Most Spiritually Influential Living people", published by Watkins Books, "Mind, Body, Spirit magazine", for the last 10 years. Three of his books have been published by Eckhart Tolle Editions, with a foreword by Eckhart Tolle.

== Personal life ==
Taylor lives in the Old Trafford area of Manchester, with his wife and 3 children.

== Book publications ==
- Out of Time (2003). Nottingham: Pauper's Press.
- The Fall: The Insanity of the Ego in Human History and the Dawning of a New Era (2005). Ropley: O Books.
- Making Time: Why Time Seems to Pass at Different Speeds and How to Control it (2007). London: Icon Books.
- Waking From Sleep: Why Awakening Experiences Occur and How to Make them Permanent (2010). London: Hay House.
- Out of the Darkness: From Turmoil to Transformation (2011). London: Hay House.
- Back to Sanity: Healing the Madness of our Minds (2012). London: Hay House.
- The Meaning: Poetic and Spiritual Reflections (2013). Ropley: O Books.
- The Calm Center: Reflections and Meditations for Spiritual Awakening (An Eckhart Tolle Edition) (2015). New World Library.
- The Leap: The Psychology of Spiritual Awakening (An Eckhart Tolle Edition) (2017). New World Library.
- Spiritual Science: Why Science Needs Spirituality to Make Sense of the World (2018). London: Watkins Publishing.
- The Clear Light: Spiritual Reflections and Meditations (An Eckhart Tolle Edition) (2020). New World Library.
- Extraordinary Awakenings: When Trauma Leads to Transformation (2021). New World Library.
- DisConnected: The Roots of Human Cruelty and How Connection Can Heal the World (2023). Iff Books.
- The Adventure: A Practical Guide to Spiritual Awakening (2024). New World Library.
- Time Expansion Experiences: (2024), Watkins Publishers

=== As editor ===
- Not I, Not Other Than I: The Life and Teachings of Russel Williams (2015). Ropley: O Books.

=== Audio course ===
- Return to Harmony: From Turmoil to Transformation (2018). Sounds True.
