= New World Library =

American publishing company

- Founded: 1977
- Founder: Marc Allen and Shakti Gawain
- Headquarters location: Novato, California, U.S.
- Distribution: Publishers Group West (US); Publishers Group UK (UK)
- Publication types: Books
- Official website: www.newworldlibrary.com

New World Library is an American publisher of books for adults and children. The press focuses on publishing New Age books concerning the mind, the body and the spirit. The company is located in Novato, California and has 16 employees.

In 1977, Marc Allen and his girlfriend at the time, Shakti Gawain, self-published hand-stapled booklets under the name Whatever Publishing; they consider this to be the founding of the press. Total sales in 1977 were $800. Their first three books were written by Marc Allen. Their fourth, Shakti Gawain's Creative Visualization, in December 1978, became an international bestseller. The success of Gawain's book launched the new company as a source of books for the creative and New Age communities. In the mid 1980s, they changed their name from “Whatever Publishing” to “New World Library“. Gawain also founded Nataraj Publishing as a division of New World Library.

In 2000, New World Library entered into a joint venture with H J Kramer, the publisher of Dan Millman, Sanaya Roman, and John Robbins's Diet for a New America. In 2001, they began publishing the works of Joseph Campbell. As of 2023, there are 30 books in his series, including a revised edition of The Hero with a Thousand Faces, which has sold over half a million copies. In 2007, New World Library acquired Inner Ocean Publishing, involving the purchase of 45 titles, including books by MoveOn, Jean Houston, and Barbara Marciniak.

New World Library has worked with distributor Publishers Group West (PGW) since 1978 which makes it PGW's oldest distribution client.

== Publications ==
New World Library publishes books in subjects such as animals, business, Celtic studies, children's books, current affairs, health, literature and writing, mythology, Native American studies, personal growth, photography, psychology, relationships, religion, Spanish language, women's studies, and yoga. It has published a number of bestselling titles, including The Power of Now by Eckhart Tolle (a New York Times bestseller for 100 weeks), The Seven Spiritual Laws of Success by Deepak Chopra, Way of the Peaceful Warrior by Dan Millman (through its H J Kramer imprint) and the Collected Works of Joseph Campbell series, including the acclaimed 2008 edition of Campbell's classic The Hero with a Thousand Faces.

== Imprints ==
In 2014, the company partnered with Eckhart Tolle to create Eckhart Tolle Editions, an imprint consisting of books identified by Tolle. In 2015, the imprint released as its first titles The Calm Center by Steve Taylor and Parenting with Presence by Susan Stiffelman.
