= Joseph Anton Schneiderfranken =

German painter, spiritual teacher and writer (1876–1943)

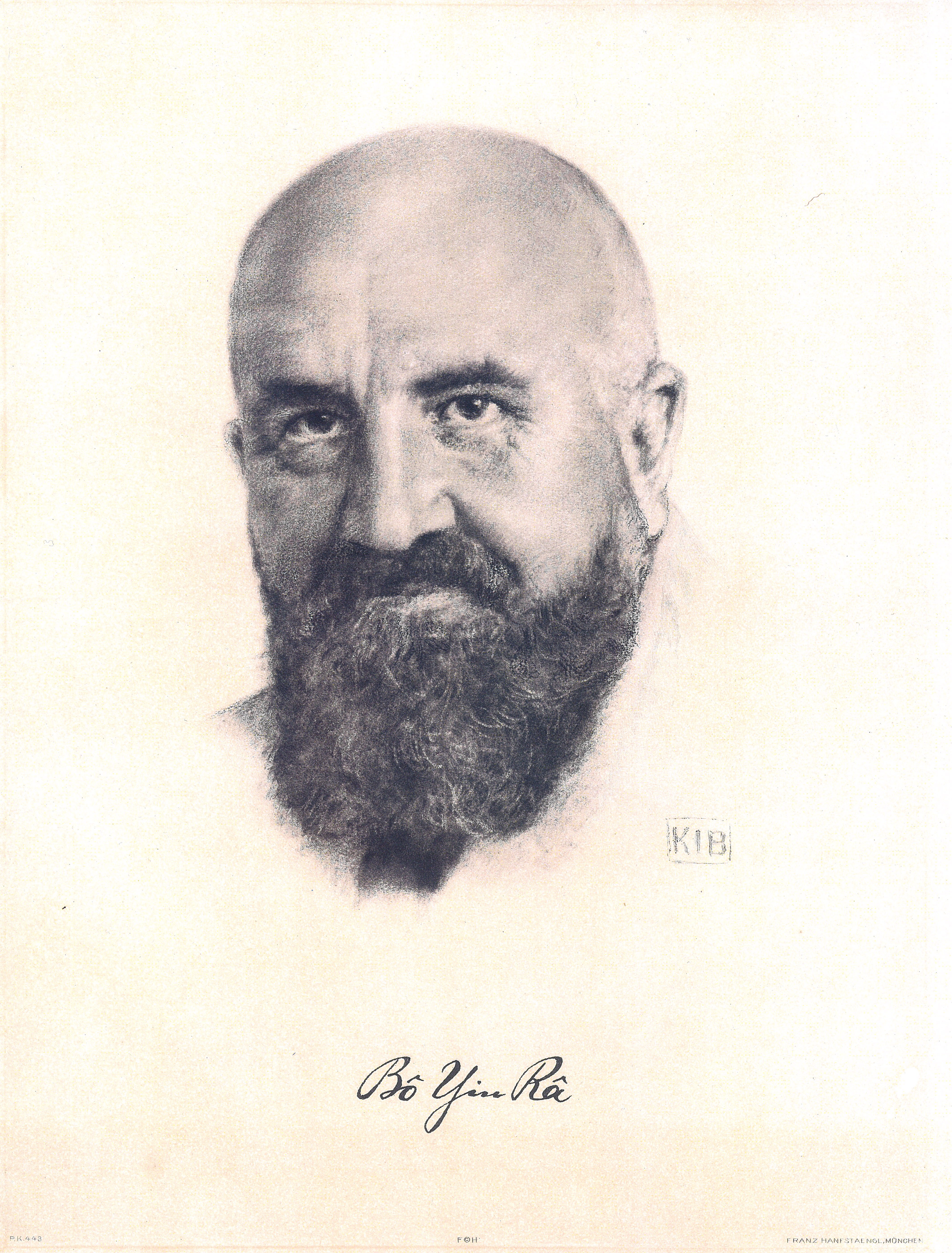
Joseph Anton Schneiderfranken, Bô Yin Râ (1920)

Joseph Anton Schneiderfranken, born as Joseph Anton Schneider, also known as Bô Yin Râ (born 25 November 1876 in Aschaffenburg; died 14 February 1943 in Massagno in Canton of Ticino, Switzerland), was a German and Swiss spiritual teacher, poet and painter. His legacy comprises forty books and close to two hundred paintings.

== Biography ==
From 1892 to 1895, Schneiderfranken studied painting at the Städel Art Institute (Städelschule) in Frankfurt. Between 1895 and 1898, he received one and a half years of free tuition from the painter Hans Thoma while also working as a scene painter at the Frankfurt City Theater. He completed his studies at the Städel master workshop in 1899.

From 1900 to 1902, Schneiderfranken continued his artistic training at the Academy of Fine Arts in Vienna, then briefly in Munich, and later at the Académie Julian in Paris. In 1912–1913, he traveled to Greece, where he adopted the spiritual name Bô Yin Râ, under which he later published his spiritual writings beginning in 1913.

During World War I, he was drafted into service and in 1917–1918 worked as an interpreter for interned Greek nationals in Görlitz. After the war, he resumed his artistic and literary work. In 1923, he moved permanently to Switzerland, first settling in Horgen on Lake Zurich and then in Massagno near Lugano in 1925. He and his family obtained Swiss citizenship in 1938.

Bô Yin Râ claimed that his teachings were based on direct inner experience of spiritual realities rather than on any external doctrine or tradition. His works, notably The Book of the Living God and The Path to God, describe a path of inner illumination, emphasizing personal realization of the divine, ethical self-discipline, and the unity of all true religions. He denied founding a sect or church, presenting his writings instead as guidance for individual spiritual development grounded in intuitive insight and creative responsibility.

Schneiderfranken influenced author Gustav Meyrink, composer Felix Weingartner, and Eckhart Tolle.

== Books ==
Here is a list of all 32 books in the spiritual teaching cycle called Hortus Conclusus by Bô Yin Râ. Many of them published with Kurt Wolff

	Original German Titles	English translation Titles
1	Das Buch der königlichen Kunst	The Book on The Royal Art
2	Das Buch vom lebendigen Gott	The Book on The Living God
3	Das Buch vom Jenseits	The Book on Life Beyond
4	Das Buch vom Menschen	The Book on Human Nature
5	Das Buch vom Glück	The Book on Happiness
6	Der Weg zu Gott	The Path to God
7	Das Buch der Liebe	The Book on Love
8	Das Buch des Trostes	The Book on Solace
9	Das Buch der Gespräche	The Book of Dialogues
10	Das Geheimnis	The Secret
11	Die Weisheit des Johannes	The Wisdom of St. John
12	Wegzeichen	Signs Along The Way
13	Das Gespenst der Freiheit	The Mirage of Freedom
14	Der Weg meiner Schüler	The Way of My Readers
15	Das Mysterium von Golgatha	The Mystery of Golgotha
16	Kult-Magie und Mythus	Cult and Ceremonial Magic
17	Der Sinn dieses Lebens	The Meaning of this Life
18	Mehr Licht	More Light
19	Das hohe Ziel	The Highest Goal
20	Auferstehung	Resurrection
21	Welten	Worlds of Spirit
22	Psalmen	Psalms
23	Die Ehe	On Marriage
24	Das Gebet	On Prayer
25	Geist und Form	Spirit and Form
26	Scintillae	Scintillas
27	Worte des Lebens	Words of Life
28	Über dem Alltag	Above the Everyday
29	Ewige Wirklichkeit	Reality Eternal
30	Leben im Licht	Living in Eternal Light
31	Briefe an Einen und Viele	Letters to One and to Many
32	Hortus Conclusus	The Gated Garden
