= Daniel Ladinsky =

American poet

Daniel Ladinsky (born 1948) is an American poet and interpreter of mystical poetry, born and raised in St. Louis, Missouri. Over a twenty-year period, beginning in 1978, he spent extensive time in a spiritual community at Meherabad, in western India, where he worked in a rural clinic free to the poor, and lived with the intimate disciples and family of Meher Baba.

Though he cannot read Persian, he has written four works which he claims are based on poetry of 14th-century Persian Sufi poet Hafiz: I Heard God Laughing (1996), The Subject Tonight Is Love (1996) The Gift (1999), and A Year With Hafiz: Daily Contemplations, (2011) as well as an anthology, Love Poems from God: Twelve Sacred Voices from the East and West (2002), and The Purity of Desire: 100 Poems of Rumi (2012). In introductions to his books, Ladinsky notes that he offers interpretations and renderings of the poets, rather than literal or scholarly translations. His work is based on conveying and being "faithful to the living spirit" of Hafiz, Rumi, and other mystic poets. Hafez scholars have argued that his writings have no connection to the great Persian poets.

In 2017 Ladinsky published Darling, I Love You: Poems from the Hearts of Our Glorious Mutts, featuring his original haiku, illustrated by Patrick McDonnell, creator of the internationally syndicated MUTTS comic strip.

== Early life and background ==
Ladinsky was born and brought up in suburbs of St. Louis, Missouri, where his father was a wealthy developer. He grew up with two brothers, and had a Jewish upbring as his father was Jewish, though he was also baptized as a Catholic, as his mother was Christian. After studying in small colleges, at age 20, he enrolled at the University of Arizona. During this period he came across the book God Speaks, by Meher Baba, and poetry by Rumi, both of which had a deep impact on him. At the back of the Meher Baba book, he found the address of the five centers dedicated to the spiritual master. Some time later, as Ladinsky recounted in an interview, intending to drive towards the Andes mountain, he took a detour of a thousand miles, and stopped at the Meher Baba Center at Myrtle Beach, South Carolina. There, he met the disciple Kitty Davy, then in her seventies, who had spent twenty years in India with Meher Baba. He stayed at the center for a few months, when Davy advised him to go back to his family, and to find a job that would let him work with his hands. Back home, his father helped him join a carpentry school.

He worked for a few years at a carpentry job, and thereafter joined his father's investment company. Unable to find fulfillment, he visited the Meher Baba Center in South Carolina again. Then, in 1978, Davy advised him to visit the Meher Baba ashram, at Meherabad, near Ahmednagar, India. There he met Meher Baba's sister Mani Irani, and his close disciple, Eruch Jessawala. Though Ladinsky's first visit lasted only two weeks, it started a process which continued with regular visits for the next two decades. He even lived in a nearby spiritual community at Meherazad for six years, working at the local free clinic

== Career ==
In early 1990s, under the guidance of Jessawala, Ladinsky started working on English renderings of poems of Hafiz, a 14th-century Persian mystic poet. Since he did not know the Persian language, he based his "renderings" on an 1891 English translation of The Divan of Hafez by Henry Wilberforce-Clarke. Eventually, he published I Heard God Laughing in 1996. Thereafter he published more works on Hafiz, The Subject Tonight Is Love (1996) and The Gift (1999). Since the release of his first publication I Heard God Laughing, Ladinsky's books have been translated into German, Hebrew, Turkish, Indonesian, and Slovene languages and maintain international best-selling status in the religious and inspirational poetry genre. The BBC invited Ladinsky to write on Hafiz. His work is widely quoted on social media, including by Rupi Kaur, Oprah, Paulo Coehlo, and many; it is reprinted in the books of internationally known authors, including Ram Dass, Eckhart Tolle, Greg Mortenson, Matthew Fox, Elif Shafak, Stephen R. Covey, Jack Kornfield, Tom Shadyac and Elizabeth Gilbert. Christian, Buddhist, Hindu, Jewish, Muslim and Sufi leaders and organizations, as well as non-affiliated spiritual and service groups, license Ladinsky's work for use and reprint.

In 2002, he published an anthology of mystical poetry from Eastern and Western mysticism, titled, Love Poems from God: Twelve Sacred Voices from the East and West.

Ladinsky's work has garnered positive commentary from Pakistani diplomat and academic Akbar S. Ahmed, has been favorably endorsed by The Christian Science Monitor writer Alexandra Marks, and has been quoted in contemporary non-fiction by American Muslim writers such as Asma Gull Hasan. The Islamic Foundation of North America used Ladinsky's The Gift in its Islamic literature curriculum. Some hail Ladinsky's contemporary work for creating an immediate access to the spirit and intention of Hafiz' verse. Ladinsky authored a short essay entitled My Portrait of Hafiz, that offers a description of the process and background of his work. Turkish novelist Elif Shafak licensed Ladinsky's Rumi work for reprint in her titles.

== Controversies ==
=== Translation misrepresentation ===
Scholars and critics argue that Ladinsky's poems are originals, and not translations or interpretations of Hafez. Christopher Shackle describes The Gift as "not so much a paraphrase as a parody of the wondrously wrought style of the greatest master of Persian art-poetry" and Aria Fani describes his contribution thusly "Ladinsky does not know Persian while his poems bear little or no resemblance to what Hafez has composed"

Reviewer Murat Nemet-Nejat contacted Ladinsky and asked him for one or two translated ghazals of Hafiz. Ladinsky was unable to produce such originals.

In April 2009, the Premier of Ontario, Dalton McGuinty, recited from Ladinsky's book at a Nowruz celebration in Toronto, but was later informed there was no corresponding Persian original for the poems.

In June 2020, Professor Omid Safi commented, "Part of what is going on here is what we also see, to a lesser extent, with Rumi: the voice and genius of the Persian speaking, Muslim, mystical, sensual sage of Shiraz are usurped and erased, and taken over by a white American with no connection to Hafez's Islam or Persian tradition. This is erasure and spiritual colonialism [...] not simply a matter of a translation dispute, nor of alternate models of translations."

== Personal life ==
Ladinsky continues to live on a rural wilderness farm in the Ozarks of Missouri, on a ranch outside of Taos, New Mexico, and, at other times, next to the Meher Spiritual Center in Myrtle Beach, South Carolina.

== Publications ==
- I Heard God Laughing: Renderings of Hafiz (1996 & 2003) ISBN 0-14-303781-1
- The Subject Tonight Is Love: Sixty Wild and Sweet Poems of Hafiz (1996 & 2006) ISBN 978-0-14-019623-8
- The Gift: Poems by Hafiz (1999) ISBN 0-14-019581-5
- Love Poems from God : Twelve Sacred Voices from the East and West (2002) ISBN 0-14-219612-6
- A Year With Hafiz: Daily Contemplations (2011) ISBN 978-0-14-311754-4
- The Purity of Desire: 100 Poems of Rumi (2012) ISBN 978-0-14-312161-9
- Darling, I Love You: Poems from the Hearts of Our Glorious Mutts illustrated by Patrick McDonnell (2017, Penguin Books) ISBN 978-0-14-312826-7

Audio

- Daniel Ladinsky; Stevin McNamara (music) (2002). Hafiz: The Scent of Light. Sounds True. ISBN 1-56455-958-0. Archived from the original on 2014-02-23.

== See also ==
- Sufism Reoriented
- Meher Baba
- Meher Spiritual Center
- Islam
- Mysticism
- Sufism
