= Eckhart Tolle =

German spiritual author (born 1948)

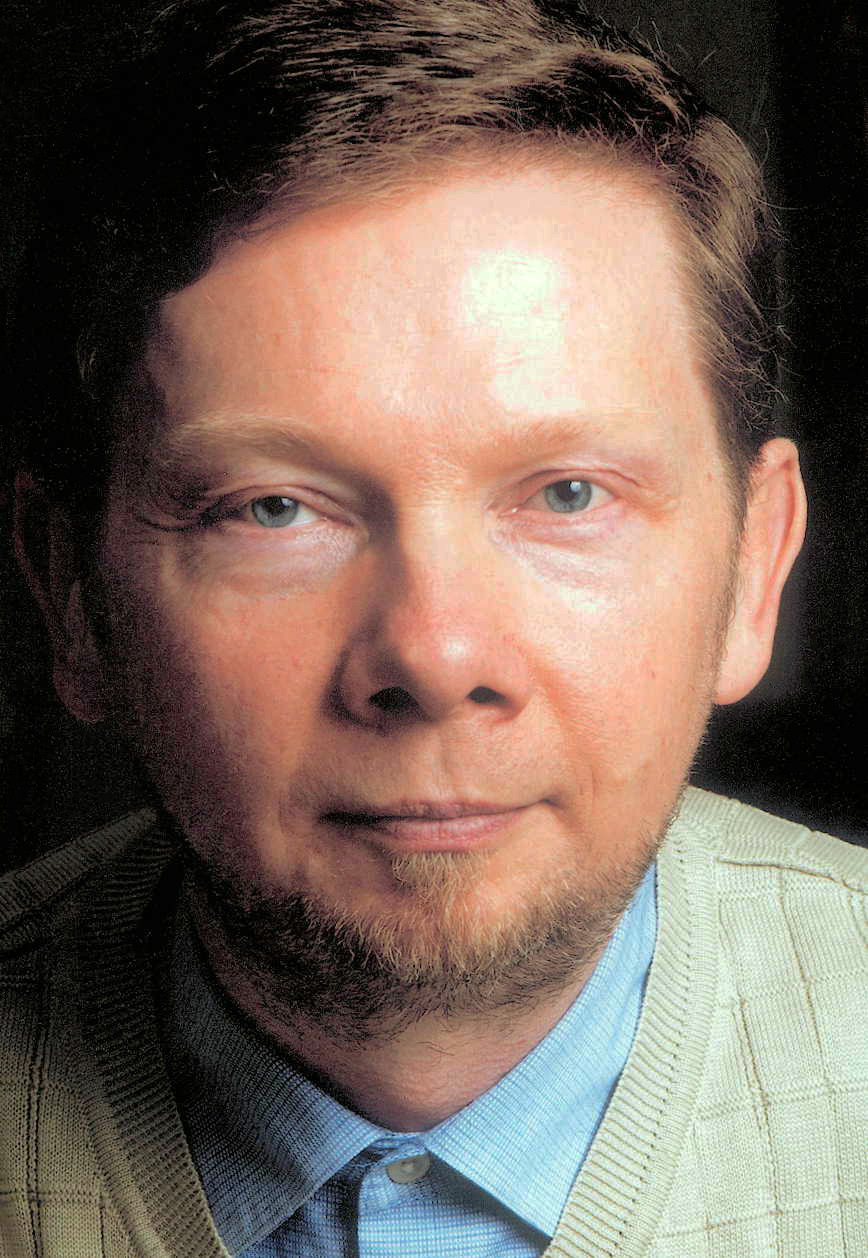
- Tolle in 2003
- Born: Ulrich Leonard Tölle; 16 February 1948 (age 78); Lünen, Occupied Germany
- Education: University of London
- Occupation: Writer
- Writing career
- Language: English, German, Spanish
- Genres: Spirituality, metaphysics, self-help
- Notable works: The Power of Now (1997); A New Earth (2005)
- Website: eckharttolle.com

Eckhart Tolle (/ˈɛkɑːrt ˈtɒlə/ EK-art TOL-ə; German: [ˈɛkhaʁt ˈtɔlə]; born Ulrich Leonard Tölle, 16 February 1948) is a German "spiritual teacher" and self-help author. His books include The Power of Now: A Guide to Spiritual Enlightenment (1997), A New Earth: Awakening to Your Life's Purpose (2005) and the picture book Guardians of Being (2009).

While working toward his doctorate at the University of Cambridge in 1977, Tolle abandoned his studies after experiencing what he has described as a spiritual awakening and later began working as a spiritual teacher. He came to prominence as a self-help author beginning in the 2000s, aided through promotion by Oprah Winfrey. His teachings draw from traditions such as Zen Buddhism, Christian mysticism, Sufism, and Hinduism, although he remains unaffiliated with any particular religion.

== Early life ==
Ulrich Leonard Tölle was born in Lünen, a small town north of Dortmund in the Ruhr region of the British-occupied Germany in 1948.

In 1961, he moved to Francoist Spain to live with his father, where he "refused all forms of formal education between the ages of 13 and 22, preferring instead to pursue his own creative and philosophical interests". At 15, he was "heavily influenced" by a gift of the five spiritual books by the German mystic Joseph Anton Schneiderfranken.

== Career ==
When he was 19, Tolle moved to England and taught German and Spanish for three years at a London language school. After attending the University of London, he enrolled in a postgraduate program at the University of Cambridge in 1977.

=== Spiritual experience ===
One night in 1977, at age 29, after having suffered long periods of depression, Tolle says he experienced an "inner transformation". That night he awakened from his sleep, suffering from feelings of depression that were "almost unbearable," but then experienced a life-changing epiphany. Recounting the experience, he said:

I couldn't live with myself any longer. And in this a question arose without an answer: who is the 'I' that cannot live with the self? What is the self? I felt drawn into a void! I didn't know at the time that what really happened was the mind-made self, with its heaviness, its problems, that lives between the unsatisfying past and the fearful future, collapsed. It dissolved. The next morning, I woke up and everything was so peaceful. The peace was there because there was no self. Just a sense of presence or "beingness," just observing and watching.

Tolle recalls going out for a walk in London the next morning and finding that "everything was miraculous, deeply peaceful. Even the traffic." The feeling continued, and he began to feel a strong underlying sense of peace in any situation., and for a period of about two years after this spent much of his time sitting "in a state of deep bliss" on park benches in Russell Square, Central London, "watching the world go by". He stayed with friends in a Buddhist monastery or otherwise slept rough on Hampstead Heath. His family thought him "irresponsible, even insane". He changed his first name to Eckhart; according to some reports this was in homage to the German philosopher and mystic Meister Eckhart. In a 2012 interview he said he saw the name Eckhart on the cover of a book in a dream, and knew he had written the book; soon thereafter, he ran into a psychic friend who called him Eckhart out of nowhere, so he changed his name.

=== Career as spiritual teacher ===
Former Cambridge students and acquaintances began to ask Tolle about his beliefs. He started working as a counselor and spiritual teacher. Students continued to come to him over the next five years. He moved to Glastonbury, a center of alternative living. In 1995, he moved to Vancouver.

The Power of Now, Tolle's first book, was published in 1997 by Namaste Publishing. The book was republished on a large scale by New World Library in 1999.

In 2000, Oprah Winfrey recommended The Power of Now in her magazine O. In August 2000, it reached The New York Times Best Seller Advice, Miscellaneous and Hardcover list, reaching number one two years later. By 2008, the book had been translated from English into 33 languages. In July 2011, it had appeared on the list of the 10 best selling Paperback Advice & Miscellaneous books for 102 weeks.

His second book, Stillness Speaks, was published in 2003. That year, he said he had no intention of creating "a heavy commercial structure" or of setting up an ashram or centre. He believed one "could develop organically" and said "one needs to be careful that the organization doesn't become self-serving". Nevertheless, his website sells his books and "a dizzying range" of materials offering spiritual guidance, and a separate website streams video of monthly group meditations.

In 2005, Tolle published A New Earth. In January 2008, Oprah selected it for her book club, and high sales followed. In the four weeks after the announcement, 3.5 million copies were shipped. It was ranked number one on The New York Times Best Seller list 46 times by the end of 2008.

In 2008, Tolle partnered with Oprah to produce a series of webinars, each focusing on a chapter from his book A New Earth, with discussions, silent meditations, and questions from viewers via Skype. The third webinar attracted more than 11 million viewers. By October 2009, the webinars had been accessed 35 million times.

In September 2009, Tolle appeared with the Dalai Lama at the Vancouver Peace Summit. The same year, he published Guardians of Being, a picture book illustrated by Patrick McDonnell.

In January 2025, Oprah selected A New Earth for her book club for a second time, making it the only book to have been chosen twice in the club’s history.

== Reception ==
=== Popularity ===
In 2008, The New York Times said that Tolle was "the most popular spiritual author" in the United States. By 2009, total sales of The Power of Now and A New Earth in North America were estimated at 3 million and 5 million copies respectively.

In 2011, the Watkins Review (now: Watkins' Mind Body Spirit) ranked him first in the inaugural list of "The 100 Most Spiritually Influential Living People." Since then, he has been included in the top five every year, which only the Dalai Lama has also achieved.

=== By the press and others ===
The books have received a wide range of praise and criticism from reviewers. In 2000, Carter Phipps wrote that "Tolle's clear writing and the obvious depth of his experience and insight set it apart". In 2003, Andrea Sachs called The Power of Now "awash in spiritual mumbo-jumbo."

Some have praised his reworking and synthesis of traditions. New Age writer William Bloom wrote, "Tolle is offering a very contemporary synthesis of Eastern spiritual teaching, which is normally so clothed in arcane language that it is incomprehensible", thereby providing "a valuable perspective on Western culture". Publisher Judith Kendra says, "The ideas [Tolle is] talking about have been in existence for thousands of years in both Eastern texts and with the great Western mystics, but he's able to make them understandable".

Some critics have characterized his books as unoriginal or derivative. James Robinson in The Observer in 2008 called his writings "a mix of pseudo-science, New Age philosophy, and teaching borrowed from established religions". A 2009 New York Times article said Tolle is "hardly the first writer to tap into the American longing for meaning and success". Sara Nelson, the editor-in-chief of Publishers Weekly, said Tolle's writings had been successful due to surging public interest in self-help books.

=== By Christian theologians ===
In 2008, an article in The Independent noted that "Tolle's theories are certainly seen by many as profoundly non-Christian, even though Tolle often quotes from the Bible" but that "Tolle does have fans in academic, even Christian, circles". It cited Andrew Ryder, a theologian at All Hallows College in Dublin, who wrote, "While he may not use the language of traditional Christian spirituality, Tolle is very much concerned that, as we make our way through the ordinary events of the day, we keep in touch with the deepest source of our being." Stafford Betty, scholar of religion at California State University, Bakersfield, finds common ground between Tolle's worldview and that of Christian mystics. He notes that "one of the key elements in Tolle's teaching is that deep within the mind is absolute stillness in which one can experience 'the joy of Being'". Roman Catholic priest and theologian Richard Rohr credits Tolle for helping to reintroduce ancient Christian mysticism to modern Christians: "Tolle is, in fact, rather brilliantly bringing to our awareness the older tradition...both the ground and the process for breaking through to the theological contemplation of God, and acquired contemplation of Jesus, the Gospels, and all spiritual things."

Conversely, James Beverley, professor of Christian Thought and Ethics at the evangelical Tyndale Seminary in Toronto, says that Tolle's worldview "is at odds with central Christian convictions" and that "Tolle denies the core of Christianity by claiming there is no ultimate distinction between humans and God and Jesus". John Stackhouse, former professor of theology and culture at evangelical Regent College in Vancouver, says that Tolle "gives a certain segment of the population exactly what they want: a sort of supreme religion that purports to draw from all sorts of lesser, that is, established religions". Stackhouse has described him as one of several spiritual teachers who "purport to have investigated the world's religions (quite a claim) and found them wanting, who routinely subject those religions to withering criticism, and who then champion their own views as superior to all these alternatives".

=== In popular culture ===
The children's picture book Milton's Secret was adapted into a film in 2016 under its original title, featuring, among others, Donald Sutherland and Michelle Rodriguez in leading roles. Tolle and his teachings take a central role in Kendrick Lamar's 2022 album Mr. Morale & the Big Steppers. Throughout the album, Tolle is positioned as Lamar's spiritual teacher, and Tolle narrates some tracks.

== Personal life ==
In 1995, after visiting the West Coast of North America several times, Tolle settled in Vancouver, British Columbia, Canada. There he met his partner, Kim Eng.

== Selected publications ==
=== Books ===
- The Power of Now: A Guide to Spiritual Enlightenment. Namaste, 1997. ISBN 978-0-96823-640-6.
- Practicing the Power of Now: Essential Teachings, Meditations, and Exercises from The Power of Now. New World Library, 2001. ISBN 1-57731-195-7.
- Stillness Speaks: Whispers of Now. New World Library, 2003. ISBN 978-1-57731-400-4.
- A New Earth: Awakening to Your Life's Purpose. Dutton, 2005. ISBN 978-0-52594-802-5.
- Oneness With All Life: Inspirational Selections from A New Earth. Penguin, 2008. ISBN 978-0-45229-608-4.

=== Graphic novels ===
- Guardians of Being. New World Library, 2009. ISBN 978-1-57731-671-8.

=== Children's books ===
- Milton's Secret: An Adventure of Discovery through Then, When, and The Power of Now. Charlottesville, Virginia, United States: Hampton Roads, 2008. ISBN 978-1-57174-577-4.
