= Shakti Gawain =

American writer (1948–2018)

Shakti Gawain (30 September 1948 – 11 November 2018) was an American New Age and personal development writer. Her books have sold over 10 million copies.

== Early life and education ==
Born Carol Louisa Gawain, she graduated from the University of California with a degree in fine arts and dance in the mid-1970s.

== Career ==
Gawain is best known for her book Creative Visualization: Use the Power of Your Imagination to Create What You Want in Life (1978). The book focuses primarily on making changes to visual mental imagery, and attributes to it the capacity for hindering or facilitating an individual's potential, citing vivid anecdotal stories drawn from her experience and that of others to support her thesis.

The first line of the book reads "Creative Visualization is the technique of creating what you want in your life". The following paragraphs define imagination as the "creative energy of the universe", and introduces the book as a means by which to use the so-defined imagination to "create what you truly want — love, fulfillment, enjoyment, satisfying relationships, rewarding work, self-expression, health, beauty, prosperity, inner peace, and harmony."

The book has been a bestseller for nearly 40 years. Subsequent to the popularity of the book, the practice of creative visualization, remained a staple and stable feature within the New Age movement, self-help media, and popular psychology of the 1980s, 1990s, and first decade of the 21st century.

=== New World Library ===
Gawain was the co-founder, with Marc Allen, of New World Library Publishing Company, and founder of Nataraj Publishing, a division of New World Library.

== Publications ==
- Creative Visualization: Use the Power of Your Imagination to Create What You Want in Your Life (1978)
- Living in the Light: A Guide to Personal and Planetary Transformation (1985)
- Developing Intuition: Practical Guidance for Daily Life (1987)
- Contacting Your Inner Guide: Step-By-Step Guided Meditations Designed to Help You Make Choices That Are Right for You (1989)
- Return to the Garden (1989)
- Awakening: A Daily Guide to Conscious Living (1991)
- Every Moment: A Journal with Affirmations (1992)
- Meditations: Creative Visualization and Meditation Exercises to Enrich Your Life (1992)
- The Path of Transformation: How Healing Ourselves Can Change the World (1993)
- The Four Levels of Healing: A Guide to Balancing the Spiritual, Mental, Emotional, and Physical Aspects of Life (1996)
- Creative Visualization Meditations (1996)
- Creating True Prosperity (1997)
- Creative Visualization and Transformation (1997)
- Partnering: A New Kind of Relationship (2000)
- Reflections in the Light: Daily Thoughts and Affirmations (2003)
- Create Your Own Affirmations: A Creative Visualization Kit (2003)
- The Millionaire Course: A Visionary Plan for Creating the Life of Your Dreams (2003)
- Living in the Light: Follow Your Inner Guidance to Create a New Life and a New World (2011)
