= Mount Yasumandake =

Mountain in Japan

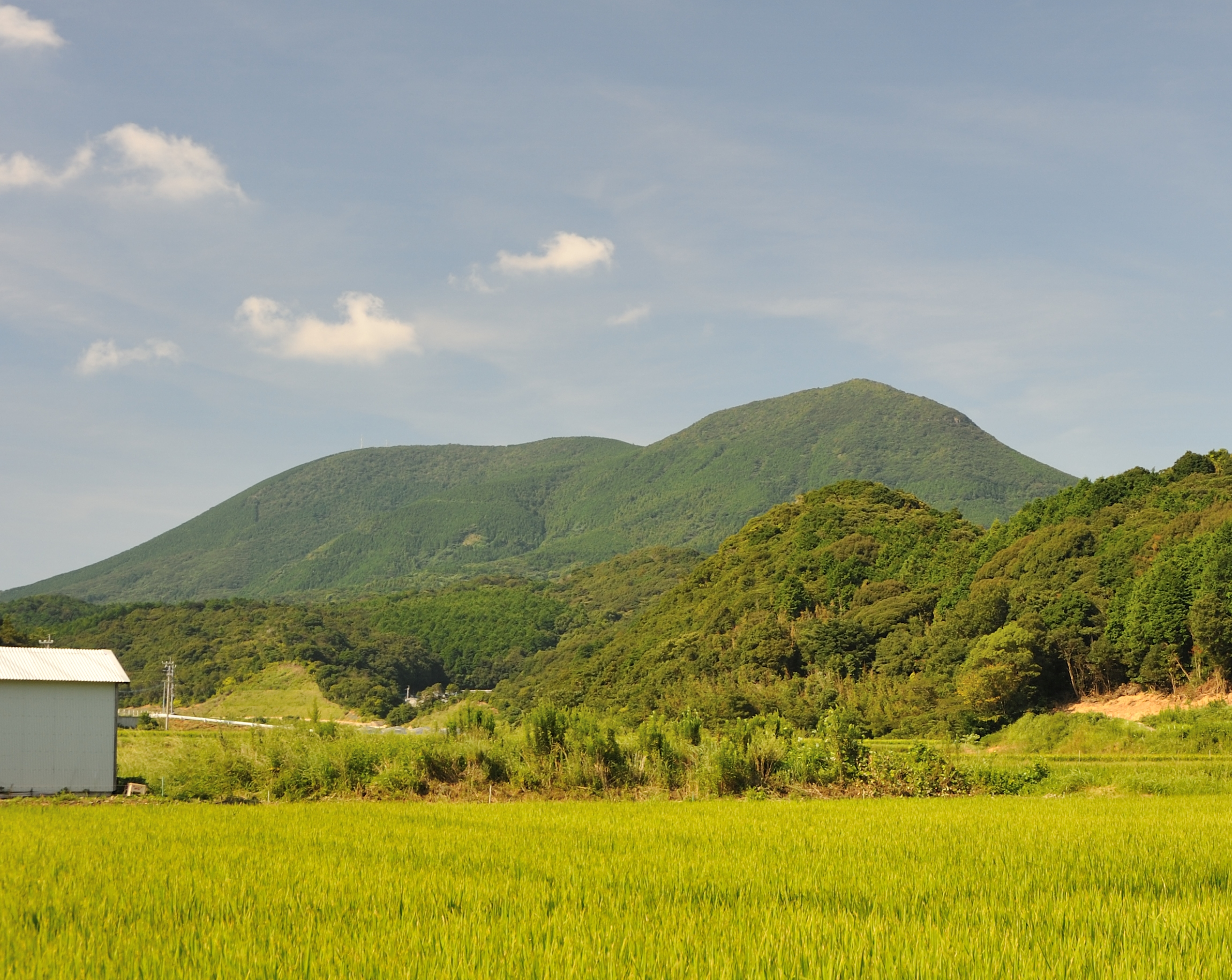
- Mount Yasumandake seen from Hirado, Nagasaki

Highest point
- Elevation: 534 m (1,752 ft)
- Prominence: 530 m (1,740 ft)
- Coordinates: 33°20′12″N 129°27′57″E

Naming
- Native name: 安満岳 (Japanese)

Geography
- Location within Japan Location within Nagasaki Prefecture
- Location: Hirado, Nagasaki
- Country: Japan

Geology
- Mountain type: Mesa

UNESCO World Heritage Site
- Part of: Hidden Christian Sites in the Nagasaki Region
- Criteria: Cultural: iii
- Reference: 1495-002
- Inscription: 2018 (42nd Session)

Mount Yasumandake (安満岳) is the highest peak on the island of Hirado, Japan. The mountain was sacred to Buddhists and Shintoists, and as Christianity became prevalent in Hirado it also became an object of Hidden Christian worship. In 2018 the mountain became a World Heritage Site as part of the "Hidden Christian Sites in the Nagasaki Region".

== Geography ==
Mount Yasumandake is considered a mesa and is covered with primeval oak forest. The mountain's surroundings form part of Saikai National Park, and the mountain's highest point is 534 metres (1,752 ft) above sea level, the highest peak on Hirado Island. Mount Yasumandake used to have a large native Sika deer population, but, due to hunting by locals and U.S troops, the population has declined. In hopes to preserve the mountain's deer population, a protected zone was designated near the mountain's center; it has been designated a Prefectural Natural Monument.

== History ==
Yasumandake was a site of mountain worship for Buddhists and Shintoists in Hirado. The mountain's primary shrine, the Hakusan-hime shrine, was first built in 718; however, due to its later destruction, it was reconstructed in modern times. The mountain's frontal approach has been paved with stone since the Edo period and is considered the main access point for the mountain. This approach is part of the Kyushu Nature Trail, a roughly 2,000-kilometre (1,200 mi) hike around the island of Kyushu. The mountain was a pilgrimage destination for Yamabushi in surrounding areas. When Christianity was banned in Japan many Hidden Christians began to consider the mountain sacred, and they began making Christian pilgrimages to the mountain's Hakusan-hime shrine under the guise of being Shinto. In 2015 the mountain received roughly one hundred visitors per month.

In 2018 Mount Yasumundake was included as a part of the World Heritage Site, "Hidden Christian Sites in the Nagasaki Region". It was inscribed with Kasuga Village and Nakaenoshima under the name "Kasuga Village and Sacred Places in Hirado".
