= List of Natural Monuments of Japan (Nagasaki) =

This list is of the Natural Monuments of Japan within the Prefecture of Nagasaki.

== National Natural Monuments ==
As of 1 April 2021, thirty-five Natural Monuments have been designated.

Monument	Municipality	Comments	Image	Coordinates	Type	Ref.
Tsushima Yamaneko; Prionailurus bengalensis euptilurus ツシマヤマネコ; Tsushima yamaneko	Tsushima			34°12′N 129°14′E	1.1	
Tsushima Marten; Martes melampus tsuensis ツシマテン; Tsushima ten	Tsushima			34°12′N 129°14′E	1.1	
Japanese Dormouse; Glirulus japonicus ヤマネ; Yamane					1.1	
Japanese Wood Pigeon; Columba janthina カラスバト; Karasubato					1.2	
Ajika-jima 阿値賀島; Ajika-jima	Hirado			33°15′02″N 129°20′21″E		
Ikenohara Kyushu Azalea Communities; Rhododendron kiusianum 池の原ミヤマキリシマ群落; Ikenohara miyama kirishima gunraku	Unzen			32°44′41″N 130°16′09″E	2.4	
Isahaya City Castle Mountain Temperate Verdure 諫早市城山暖地性樹叢; Isahaya-shi shiroyama danchi seijusō	Isahaya			32°50′43″N 130°02′51″E	2.2	
Mount Iwato Verdure 岩戸山樹叢; Iwato-yama jusō	Minamishimabara			32°37′30″N 130°09′22″E	2.2	
Giant Mottled Eel Habitat; Anguilla marmorata オオウナギ生息地; Ōunagi seisokuchi	Nagasaki			32°33′46″N 129°47′00″E	1.3	
Ōmura Jinja Ōmura Cherry; Prunus 大村神社のオオムラザクラ; Ōmura Jinja no Ōmura-zakura	Ōmura			32°53′52″N 129°57′26″E	2.1	
Ōmura Red-bark Oak Natural Forest; Quercus gilva 大村のイチイガシ天然林; Ōmura no ichiigashi tennen-rin	Ōmura			32°56′22″N 130°00′00″E	2.2	
Ohashi Kannon Fern Plant Communities; Pteridopsida 御橋観音シダ植物群落; Ohashi Kannon shida shokubutsu gunraku	Sasebo			33°16′22″N 129°42′04″E	2.9,10	
Balanophora tobiracola Native Northern Limit キイレツチトリモチ自生北限地; Kiiretsuchitorimochi jisei hoku genchi	Nagasaki			32°45′21″N 129°54′09″E	2.10	
Kuroko-jima Primeval Forest 黒子島原始林; Kuroko-jima genshi-rin	Hirado			33°22′24″N 129°33′43″E	2.2	
Gensei-numa Marshland Plant Communities 原生沼沼野植物群落; Gensei-numa shōya shokubutsu gunraku	Unzen			32°44′26″N 130°15′30″E	2.6	
Konagai Magnolia compressa 小長井のオガタマノキ; Konagai no ogatamanoki	Isahaya			32°55′57″N 130°09′08″E	2.1	
Jigoku Zone Enkianthus cernuus Communities 地獄地帯シロドウダン群落; Jigoku chitai shirodoudan gunraku	Unzen			32°44′26″N 130°15′51″E	2.2	
Mount Sumoshira Primeval Forest 洲藻白岳原始林; Sumoshira-take genshi-rin	Tsushima			34°15′40″N 129°15′07″E	2.2	
Tatsunoshima Coastal Plant Communities 辰の島海浜植物群落; Tatsunoshima kaihin shokubutsu gunraku	Iki			33°52′02″N 129°40′40″E	2.5	
Mount Tatera Primeval Forest 龍良山原始林; Tatera-yama genshi-rin	Tsushima			34°08′31″N 129°13′33″E	2.2	
Mount Tara Rhododendron japonoheptamerum Grouping 多良岳ツクシシャクナゲ群叢; Tara-dake tsukushi shakunage gunsō	Isahaya			32°57′58″N 130°05′24″E	2.2	
Danjo Islands 男女群島; Danjo-guntō	Gotō			31°59′16″N 128°20′54″E		
Nanatsugama Limestone Cave 七釜鍾乳洞; Nanatsugama shōnyūdō	Saikai			33°01′32″N 129°39′44″E	3.6	
Narao Sea Fig; Ficus superba 奈良尾のアコウ; Narao no akō	Shin-Kamigotō			32°50′23″N 129°03′35″E	2.1	
Naru Island Mount Gongen Verdure; Ficus superba 奈留島権現山樹叢; Narushima Gongen-yama jusō	Gotō			32°49′32″N 128°56′19″E	2.2	
Mount No Japanese Holly Communities; Ilex crenata 野岳イヌツゲ群落; No-dake inutsuge gunraku	Unzen			32°44′38″N 130°17′20″E	2.2	
Hijikuro River Nemalionopsis tortuosa Site of Incidence 土黒川のオキチモズク発生地; Hijikuro-gawa no okichimozuku hassei-chi	Unzen			32°50′53″N 130°17′37″E	2.8	
Hirado Conglomerate Rock Plant Communities 平戸礫岩の岩石地植物群落; Hirado tsubute-iwa no ganseki-chi shokubutsu gunraku	Hirado			33°14′09″N 129°23′59″E	2.3,10	
Fugen-dake Autumn Colour Forest 普賢岳紅葉樹林; Fugen-dake kōyō jurin	Unzen			32°45′36″N 130°17′42″E	2.2	
Heisei Shinzan 平成新山; Heisei-shinzan	Shimabara, Unzen			32°45′41″N 130°17′56″E	3.10	
Madara Island Pothole 斑島玉石甌穴; Madara-jima tamaishi ōketsu	Ojika			33°12′45″N 129°01′29″E	3.9	
Mitake Bird Breeding Grounds 御岳鳥類繁殖地; Mitake chōrui hanshoku-chi	Tsushima			34°34′17″N 129°22′44″E	1.2	
Meotoki Giant Japanese Cedar; Cryptomeria japonica 女夫木の大スギ; Meotoki no ō-sugi	Isahaya			32°48′59″N 130°04′00″E	2.1	
Waniura Chinese Fringetree Native Spot; Chionanthus retusus 鰐浦ヒトツバタゴ自生地; Waniura hitotsubatago jisei-chi	Tsushima			34°41′22″N 129°26′32″E	2.10	
Cyathea spinulosa Northern Native Range ヘゴ自生北限地帯; Hego jisei hoku genchi-tai	Gotō			32°39′43″N 128°46′45″E	2.10	

April 2021

== Prefectural Natural Monuments ==
As of 26 February 2021, one hundred and five Natural Monuments have been designated at a prefectural level.

Monument	Municipality	Comments	Image	Coordinates	Type	Ref.
Deer of Hirado 平戸のシカ; Hirado no shika	Hirado	on Mount Yasumandake (安満岳)		33°20′06″N 129°28′09″E		
Biryō-jima 美良島; Biryō-jima	Ojika			33°10′06″N 128°54′00″E		

== Municipal Natural Monuments ==
As of 1 May 2020, one hundred and thirty-eight Natural Monuments have been designated at a municipal level.

== See also ==
- Cultural Properties of Japan
- Parks and gardens in Nagasaki Prefecture
- List of Places of Scenic Beauty of Japan (Nagasaki)
- List of Historic Sites of Japan (Nagasaki)
