= Nakaenoshima =

Island in Japan

Native name: 中江ノ島
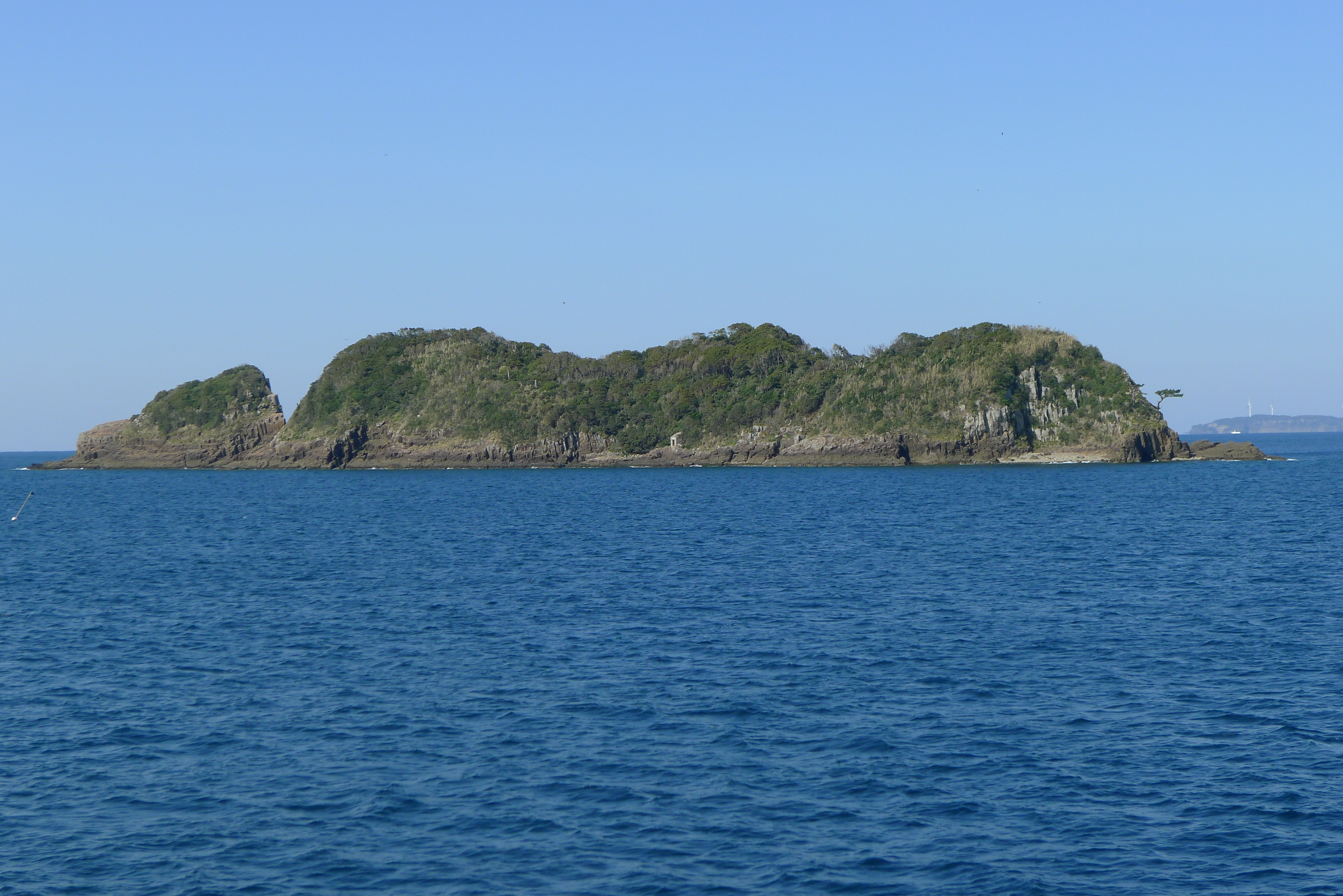
- Nakaenoshima's coast in 2019

- Location of Nakaenoshima Nakaenoshima (Japan)

Geography
- Location: East China Sea
- Coordinates: 33°22′23.7″N 129°27′54.8″E
- Coastline: 0.9 km (0.56 mi)

Administration
- Japan

Demographics
- Population: Uninhabited

UNESCO World Heritage Site
- Part of: Hidden Christian Sites in the Nagasaki Region
- Criteria: Cultural: iii
- Reference: 1495-003
- Inscription: 2018 (42nd Session)

Nakaenoshima (中江ノ島) is an uninhabited island 2 km off the coast of Hirado, Japan. It is located in the East China Sea.

During Japan's ban on Christianity many Japanese Christians were martyred on the island and it is now closed to all tourists. it was inscribed as a World Heritage Site in 2018 as part of the Hidden Christian Sites in the Nagasaki Region.

== Geography ==
Nakaenoshima is a small island with a coastline of 900 meters. It is mostly forested, and its highest point is 34.6 meters above sea level. It is designated as part of Saikai National Park. The island has minimal development, and its natural environment has remained unchanged since the Meiji Era. The sea around Nakaenoshima has also not undergone major development and has been conserved in good condition.

== History ==
During Japan's ban on Christianity many Japanese Christians were martyred on the island. The island was venerated by many Japanese Christians and holy water from the Island was used in many baptisms in the surrounding areas. In 2018 the island was inscribed as a World Heritage Site, part of the Hidden Christian Sites in the Nagasaki Region.

== Access ==
Tourists are prohibited from visiting the island due to its geography. Only Hidden Christians from Ikitsuki are allowed to visit and permission is granted to these Christians during Omizutori when holy water is drawn from the island's rocks. Although the island is closed off to non-religious tourists, the city of Hirado has begun sponsoring waste clean-up missions to the island, in hopes of conserving its preserved state. Since the island's inscription as a World Heritage Site, viewing cruises have been planned to Educate visitors on the island's history.
