= Ojika, Nagasaki =

Ojika 小値賀町
- Town
- Flag Seal

- Location of Ojika in Nagasaki Prefecture

- Location in Japan
- Coordinates: 32°12′N 129°4′E
- Country: Japan
- Region: Kyushu
- Prefecture: Nagasaki Prefecture
- District: Kitamatsuura

Government
  - Mayor: Hisayuki Nishimura

Area
  - Total: 25.46 km^{2} (9.83 sq mi)

Population (2020)
  - Total: 2,288
  - Density: 89.87/km^{2} (232.8/sq mi)
- Time zone: UTC+09:00 (JST)
- Website: www.ojika.net

Ojika (小値賀町, Ojika-chō) is a town located in Kitamatsuura District, Nagasaki Prefecture, Japan.

It covers the island of the same name Ojika, located north of Gotō Islands.

As of the 2020 census, the town has an estimated population of 2,288 and a density of 90 persons per km^{2}. The total area is 25.46 km^{2}.

The islands of Ojika are part of Saikai National Park.

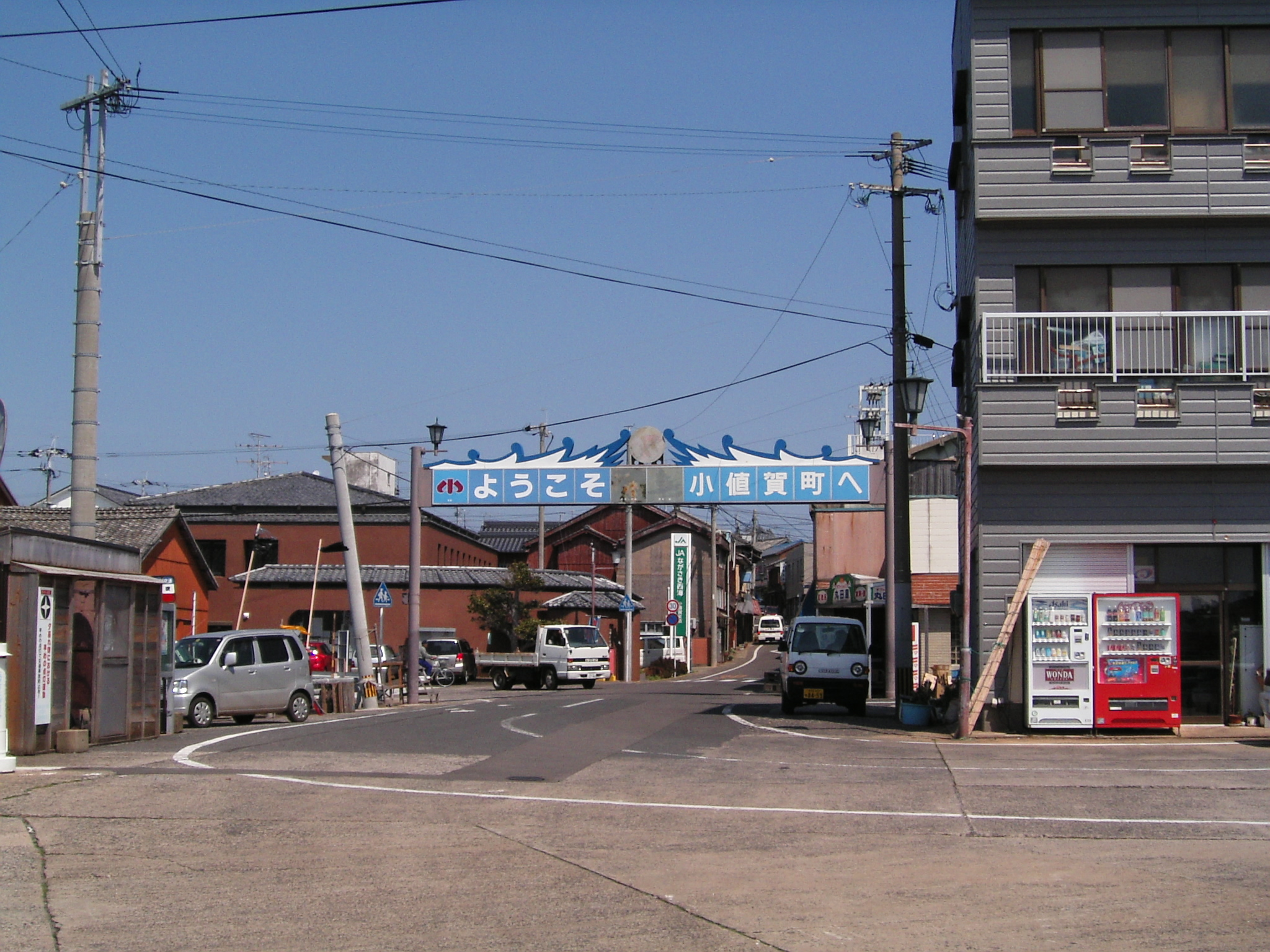
An entrance to the town.

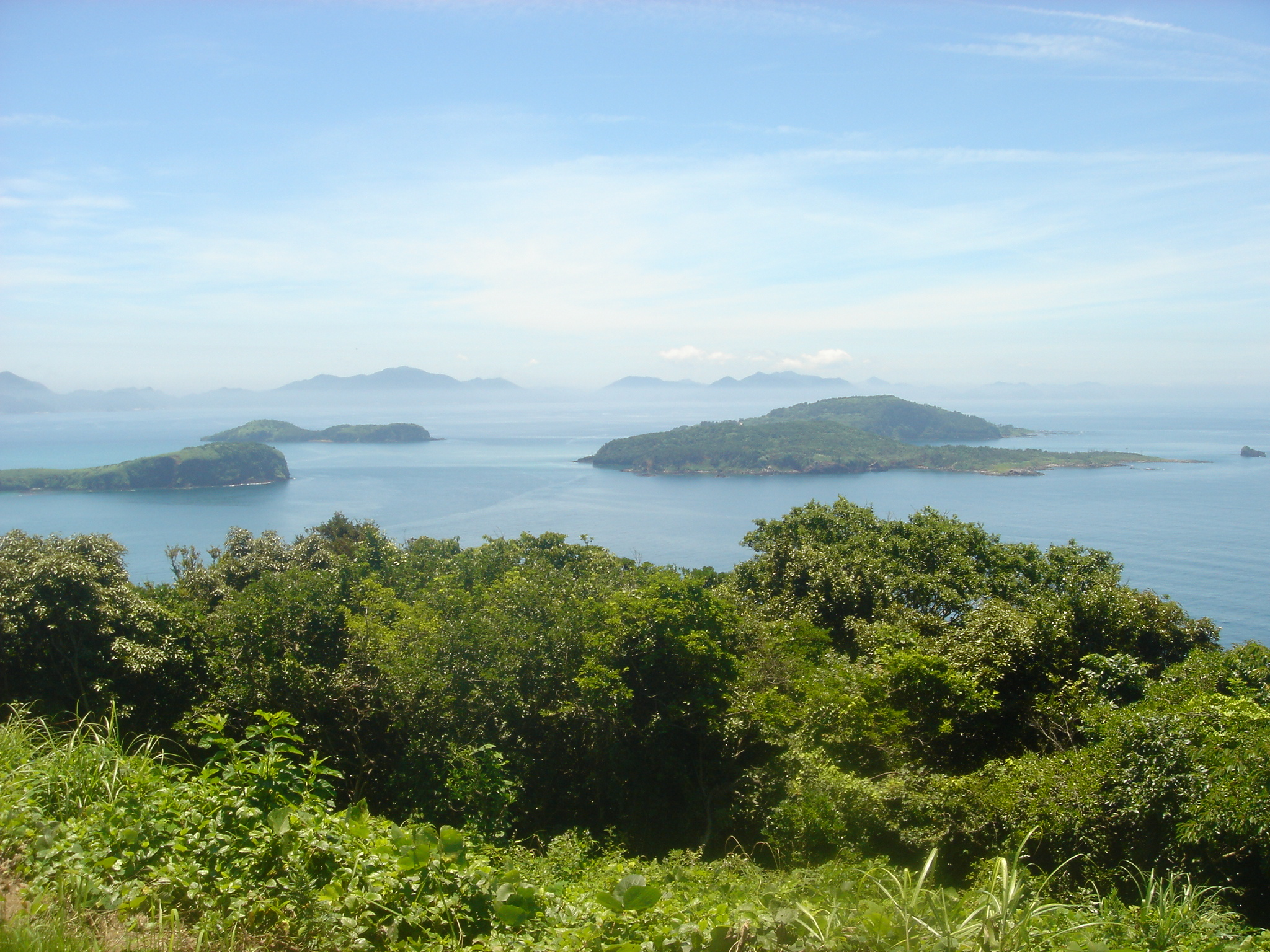
Several of the Ojika islands, taken from Matsubara Park

== History ==
The town of Ojika is made up of 17 large and small islands, six of which are populated: Ojika, Madara, Kuroshima, Noshima, Mushima, and Ōshima. Over 20 volcanoes can be found in the sea surrounding the island. The area has been called the "Eastern Galapagos Island." The main island is approximately 34 km in circumference, with all islands totaling 97 km in circumference. The islands are found within the boundaries of Saikai National Park, preserving the region's natural heritage.

Stone tools dated from 10,000 B.C. have been discovered on the islands, along with other relics. The first mention of Ojika was in Nihon Shoki in the 8th century. Although Ojika Island is one of the smallest islands in the Gotō Islands, it was characterized as the entrance to the East China Sea. Around the year 1600, whaling became a major industry, with certain families such as the Oda family profiting from the trade. The Oda Whaling Guild, based in Ojika, established a whaling base on Hirado Island in 1692 and operated until 1859. The present day Ojika History Museum was the former home of the Oda family.

71% of trade ceramics on the Gotō Islands were found at sites throughout the islands of Ojika, with another 22% found from the neighboring Ukushima. In 2001, archeological survey was carried out by the Ojika City Board of Education in conjunction with the Kyushu and Okinawa Society for Underwater Archeology at the underwater site of Yamami, situated on a small reef 100 meters from the eastern shore of Ojika in the Karamizaki ward. A number of shards of Thai stoneware, as well as Chinese blue and white pottery, likely from Jingdezhen, dating to the 16th and 17th centuries were found. Many of the ceramics can now be found at the Ojika History Museum. It is likely that many wokou, island pirates, were active around Ojika and Uku.

Ojika and the now-abandoned, neighboring island of Nozaki were some of the islands settled by the Hidden Christians who fled mainland Japan after the ban of Christianity by the Tokugawa shogunate in the 16th century. Following the repeal of the ban in 1873, a small church, the Nokubi Christian Church, was built on Nozaki. The remains of the villages on Nozaki are now included as the UNESCO World Heritage Site Hidden Christian Sites in the Nagasaki Region.

== Demographics ==
The population of Ojika peaked in the 1950s at roughly 11,000. Today the population of the island is rapidly decreasing, and is now around half the number as in the 1970s. The remaining islanders have largely gathered on the main island and abandoned some of the smaller outlying islands, such as Nozaki. Nozaki was abandoned by the six remaining families in 1971 after a pregnant woman died in childbirth with no doctor present due to stormy weather making the island inaccessible. In 2015, 46.4% of the population of Ojika was above 65 years old, compared to the national average of 26.8%, a common trend among other remote islands in Japan. The local government has promoted initiatives for "U-turn", where former residents return to the islands, and "I-turn", where newcomers settle on the islands from more urban areas, such as an agricultural school that guarantees free land use following graduation.

Because of the stressed financial situation of the town, the local community discussed whether the town should merge with Sasebo, but ultimately decided not to do so and remain as a single town in April 2008.

The island hosts the Ojika International Music Festival and Kids Camping Kingdom, as well as various other activities promoting sightseeing. Nozaki Island, though abandoned, has been developed as an eco-camp with a number of hiking trails. Nature programs targeted for elementary and junior high school students began in 2001, using a former school building as accommodation for these groups. Besides tourism, major industries include fishing and farming. A wide variety of Ojika's marine products are famous, such as chicken grunt, amberjack, beltfish, and abalone. The Ojika islands are one of the most important abalone fishing areas in Nagasaki Prefecture, with a tradition of abalone fishing dating back over 300 years.

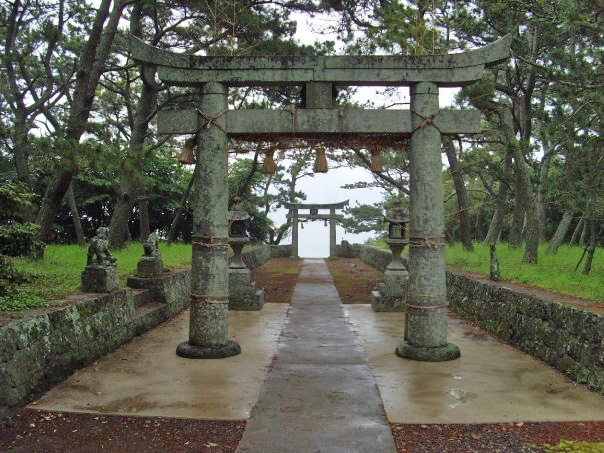
Chinokoujima Shrine's torii gate

== Major sights ==
=== Akahama coast ===
Ojika islands are made up of volcanic rocks, thus much of the coast consists of red sands.

=== Chinokoujima Shrine ===
Chinokoujima Shrine (地ノ神嶋神社) consists of a rare torii which is composed of three parts. Maegata Bay is adjacent to the shrine - a twin shrine, Okinokoujima, is directly opposite of Chinokoujima on Nozaki Island.

=== Hime no Matsubara ===
A 450-meter-long avenue of pine trees, this avenue has been selected as the best of 100 pine tree locations in Japan, and the best of 8 sights in the Hokusho region.

=== Kominka ===
In 2007, the Ojika municipal government began a program of converting century-old private houses known as kominka (古民家) into lodging. All the homes were donated by the houses' original owners, which were then renovated and restored. Six houses, one restaurant, and one guesthouse have so far been converted.

== Ecology ==
The native forests of Ojika were cut down in order to create space for rice paddies and cattle farming. The remaining forest has been largely colonized by invasive species brought to the island as a result of trade with Japan and China over the centuries.

The main island of Ojika is surrounded by a shallow underwater plateau with an extensive rocky seabed around the islands. This contributes to breeding and fishing grounds for abalone, which are caught once or twice per year using a form of breath-hold diving. Abalone are dependent on the presence and quality of macroalgae beds, which has significantly degraded around the Ojika islands, contributing the gradual decline in the annual landed catches of abalone since the late 1980s. Decreases and disappearances of macroalgal beds have affected the two main species of abalone, Haliotis discus and Haliotis gigantea, differently. H. discus has been able to mature and the catch per unit effort (CPUE) has remained stable. However almost no H. gigantea were able to mature due to the loss of macroalgal beds and the population will become locally extinct without intervention for the recovery of the macroalgal beds.

The sea star Ophidaster multispinus, previously found only in the Hainan Strait of southern China, was first identified in Japan in the Ojika islands.

== Transportation ==
Ojika can be reached by two ferry lines, one from Fukuoka which is a five-hour journey, and the other from Sasebo, which takes about two hours.

Although there is an airport on the island, it does not have regular service. Instead, planes can be chartered to Ojika during the higher parts of the tourist seasons.
