= Hidden Christian Sites in the Nagasaki Region =

UNESCO World Heritage Site
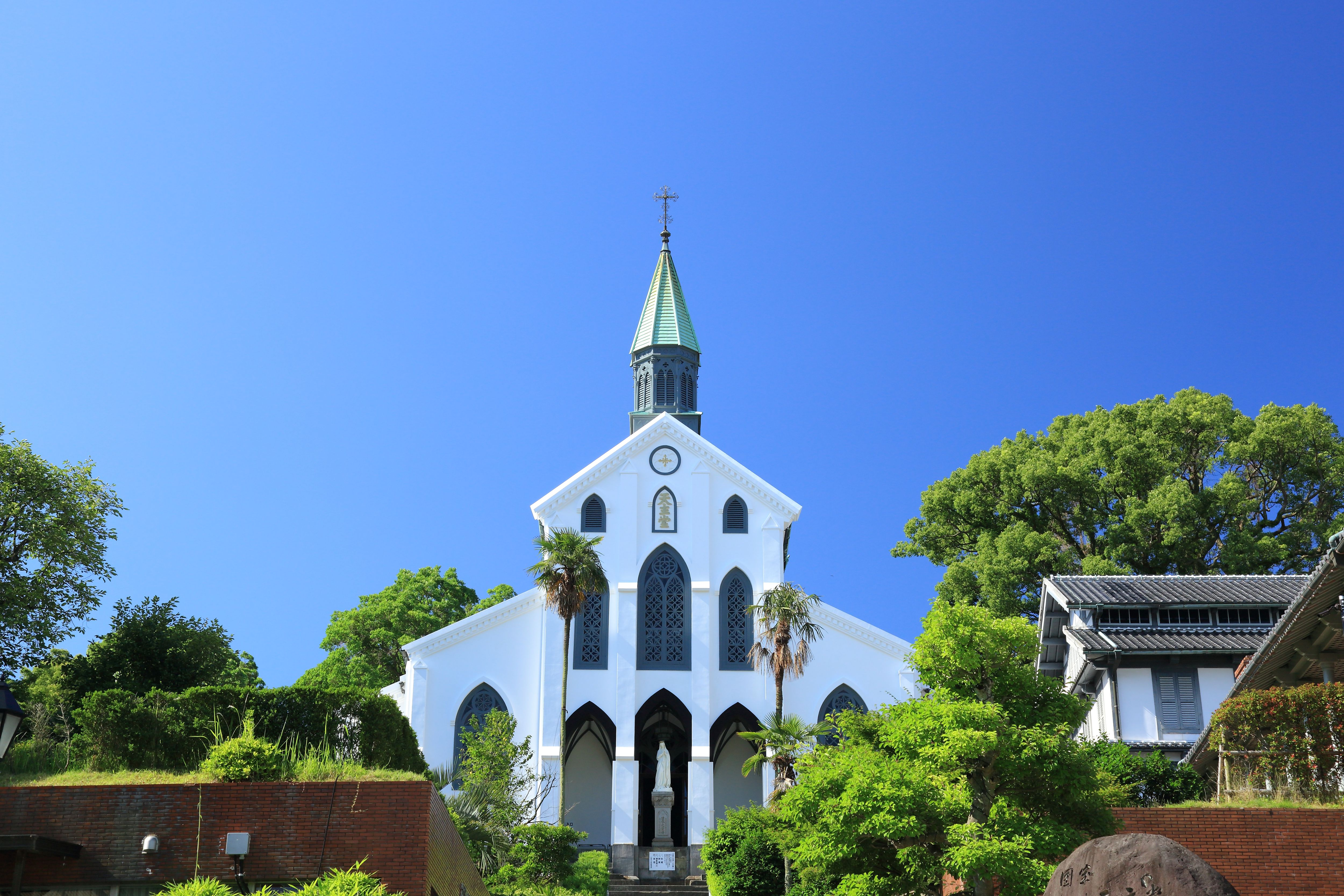
- Ōura Cathedral

- Location within Japan
- Location: Nagasaki and Kumamoto, Japan
- Criteria: Cultural: iii
- Reference: 1495
- Inscription: 2018 (42nd Session)
- Area: 5,566.55 ha (13,755.2 acres)
- Buffer zone: 12,252.52 ha (30,276.6 acres)
- Coordinates: 32.734106°N 129.870236°E

Hidden Christian Sites in the Nagasaki Region (Japanese: 長崎と天草地方の潜伏キリシタン関連遺産) is a group of twelve sites in Nagasaki Prefecture and Kumamoto Prefecture relating to the history of Christianity in Japan. The Nagasaki churches are unique in the sense that each tells a story about the revival of Christianity after a long period of official suppression.

Proposed jointly in 2007 for inscription on the UNESCO World Heritage List under criteria ii, iii, iv, v, and vi, the submission named at the time Churches and Christian Sites in Nagasaki on the Tentative List, was recognized on January 30, 2018, as a World Heritage Site.

The initial nomination included 26 sites; however, after reconsideration the Nagasaki Prefecture reduced the monuments to 13 sites. Twelve sites were recognized. Concerns over the Hidden Christian Sites in the Nagasaki Region have been widely discussed in the academic literature.

== Christianity in Japan ==
Christianity arrived in Japan in 1549 with the Jesuit missionary Francis Xavier. Fanning out from Nagasaki, the new faith won many converts, including a number of daimyōs. Toyotomi Hideyoshi, then Tokugawa Ieyasu persecuted those professing to be Christian. After the Shimabara Rebellion of 1637–1638, the official suppression of Christian practices was combined with a policy of national seclusion that lasted over two centuries.

In the 1850s, the arrival of Western powers and reopening of Japan and the reforms of the Meiji Restoration, missionary activity was renewed and a number of Hidden Christians resurfaced. Ōura Cathedral of 1864 was the first of the churches built in subsequent years.

On 30 June 2018, thanking UNESCO for the admission in the World Heritage List, the then Prime Minister Shinzo Abe publicly declared that the Hidden Christian Sites "convey the 'shape' of a faith that is unique to Japan and they are truly unparalleled worldwide as heritage of humankind."

== Monuments ==
Name	Location	Image	Notes
Remains of Hara Castle (原城跡)	Minamishimabara		Historic Site
Kasuga Village and Sacred Places in Hirado (Kasuga Village and Mt. Yasumandake) (平戸島の聖地と集落＝安満岳)	Hirado		Important Cultural Landscape
Kasuga Village and Sacred Places in Hirado (Nakaenoshima Island) (平戸島の聖地と集落＝中江ノ島)	Hirado		No Entry
Sakitsu Village in Amakusa (天草の﨑津集落)	Amakusa, Kumamoto		Important Cultural Landscape
Shitsu Village in Sotome (出津集落)	Nagasaki		
Ono Village in Sotome (大野集落)	Nagasaki		Important Cultural Property
Villages on Kuroshima Island (黒島の集落)	Sasebo		Important Cultural Property
Remains of Villages on Nozaki Island (野崎島の集落跡)	Ojika		
Villages on Kashiragashima Island (頭ヶ島の集落)	Shin-Kamigotō		Important Cultural Property
Villages on Hisaka Island (久賀島の集落)	Gotō		Important Cultural Property
Egami Village on Naru Island (Egami Church and its Surroundings) (奈留島の江上集落)	Gotō		Important Cultural Property
Oura Cathedral (大浦天主堂)	Nagasaki		National Treasure

== Previous nominated monuments ==
The list consists of sites previously nominated, but currently not in the list.

Name	Completion Date	Location	Construction type	Comments	Image
Former Catholic Seminary (旧羅典神学校)	1875	Nagasaki	Timber-framed Brick	Important Cultural Property	
Aosagaura Church (青砂ヶ浦天主堂)	1910	Shinkamigotō	Brick	Important Cultural Property	
Mementos of Father Marc Marie de Rotz (ド・ロ神父遺跡)		Nagasaki			
Former Shitsu Aid Center (旧出津救助院)		Nagasaki		Shelter, macaroni factory, and sardine processing area are all Important Cultural Properties	
Dōzaki Church (堂崎教会)	1907	Gotō	Brick		
Hōki Church (宝亀教会)	1899	Hirado	Wood/Brick		
Christian tombstone (吉利支丹墓碑)		Minamishimabara		Historic Site	
Site of the Martyrdom of the 26 Saints of Japan (日本二十六聖人殉教地)	1864	Nagasaki			
Site of Saint Dominic Church (サント・ドミンゴ教会跡)	1609	Nagasaki			
Urakami Cathedral (浦上天主堂)	1959	Nagasaki	Reinforced concrete		
Former Residence of Archbishop (旧大司教館)	1914	Nagasaki			
Kaminoshima Church (神ノ島教会)	1897	Nagasaki	Brick		
Kurosaki Church (黒崎教会)	1920	Nagasaki	Brick		
Himosashi Church (紐差教会)	1929	Hirado	Reinforced concrete		
Ōso Church (大曾教会)	1916	Shinkamigotō	Brick		

== See also ==
- Kirishitan
- Kakure Kirishitan
- Tenshō embassy
- Hasekura Tsunenaga
- Nagasaki Peace Park
- World Heritage Sites in Japan
- National Treasures of Japan
