= Hirado Island =

Island in Nagasaki, Japan

Native name: 平戸島 Hiradoshima
- Location within Japan

Geography
- Location: Sea of Japan
- Coordinates: 33°22′5″N 129°33′13″E
- Area: 163.42 km^{2} (63.10 sq mi)
- Length: 32 km (19.9 mi)
- Width: 10 km (6 mi)
- Coastline: 203.5 km (126.45 mi)
- Highest elevation: 535 m (1755 ft)
- Highest point: Mount Yasumandake

Administration
- Japan
- Prefecture: Nagasaki Prefecture
- city: Hirado

Demographics
- Population: 21355 (2005)
- Pop. density: 131/km^{2} (339/sq mi)
- Ethnic groups: Japanese

Hirado Island (平戸島, Hiradoshima) (also previously named Hiranoshima and Firando Island) is the 4th largest island in Nagasaki Prefecture, located in the Sea of Japan. The entire island and the part of the nearby Kyushu mainland is administered as part of Hirado city. The island's highest peak is Mount Yasumandake 535 m (1,755 ft). Saikai National Park comprise 24% of the island's total area.

== Geology ==
Hirado Island was formed as a horst elevated from the sea in Pliocene period. Its bedrock features a mixture of the sea sedimentary rocks of Tertiary period, mixed and overlaid by the recent igneous rock. Due to being relatively young, the island is very hilly with large fraction of area over 200 meters elevation, and flat land is limited to marginal coastal plains. The coastline is highly indented and feature a large cliffs along the entire north-west coast facing East China Sea, except for river mouths.

== History ==
The Hirado Island port was the primary departure point for the Japanese missions to Sui China and Japanese missions to Tang China in the 7th-9th centuries.

On 16 October 1274, the Hirado Island was invaded by a detachment of the Mongol army as part of the Mongol invasions of Japan. During the 2nd invasion of 1281, the island was an important rear base for the Mongols until being abandoned after the invasion failed.

Since the Muromachi period in the 14th century, the island had become the hub for the Wokou pirates. In the development of the Nanban trade with Europe, the Portuguese trade station was operational on the island in 1550-1561 period. In 1584, the Spanish, British and Dutch traders started visiting the island once again.

The Hirado Domain was established and Hirado Castle built under leadership of the Matsuura clan in 1599. The castle was razed in 1613 and re-built in 1704.

In 1609–1641, a Dutch trading post was established on Hirado Island before being transferred to Dejima. From 1613, the ships of William Adams started operating from Hirado Island too, but the British trade mission was closed in 1623.

In 2005, the city merged with the neighboring towns of Tabira, Ikitsuki, forming Hirado city, comprising all of Hirado Island as well as part of Kyushu.

== Transportation ==
The Hirado Bridge traverses the over-570-meters-wide strait that connects the Hirado Island to Kyushu. The bridge was completed in 1977 and the transit fee was cancelled in 2010. Also, Ikitsuki Bridge (completed in 1991) connects Hirado Island to the Ikitsuki Island. The island is served by the national Route 383. Ferries are available for transfer to the lesser inhabited islands nearby.

== Climate ==
Hirado Island is located in the humid subtropical climate zone (Köppen Cfa), with four distinct seasons. The island rarely sees snowfall during the winter. Spring in Hirado Island starts off mild, but ends up being very humid. The summer tends to be Hirado's wettest season, with the tsuyu (梅雨, tsuyu; "plum rain") — the rainy season — occurring between early June (average:Jun.7) to late July (average:Jul.21). The island's weather is affected by the nearby Liman current while being shielded from the warm Kuroshio Current by the Kyushu island, resulting in wetter and colder climate than should be expected at lower 30's latitudes. The climate of Hirado Island is greatly moderated by the surrounding sea, resulting in reduced seasonal and diurnal temperature variations.

Climate data for Hirado weather station(1981–2010)
Month	Jan	Feb	Mar	Apr	May	Jun	Jul	Aug	Sep	Oct	Nov	Dec	Year
Mean daily maximum °C (°F)	9.3 (48.7)	10.2 (50.4)	13.0 (55.4)	17.4 (63.3)	21.2 (70.2)	24.0 (75.2)	27.6 (81.7)	29.4 (84.9)	22.2 (72.0)	21.9 (71.4)	16.9 (62.4)	11.9 (53.4)	19.9 (67.8)
Daily mean °C (°F)	6.7 (44.1)	7.3 (45.1)	9.9 (49.8)	14.0 (57.2)	17.7 (63.9)	21.0 (69.8)	24.9 (76.8)	26.3 (79.3)	23.4 (74.1)	18.9 (66.0)	13.9 (57.0)	9.2 (48.6)	16.1 (61.0)
Mean daily minimum °C (°F)	4.1 (39.4)	4.5 (40.1)	6.9 (44.4)	10.8 (51.4)	14.8 (58.6)	18.7 (65.7)	23.0 (73.4)	23.9 (75.0)	21.1 (70.0)	16.0 (60.8)	11.0 (51.8)	6.3 (43.3)	13.4 (56.1)
Average precipitation mm (inches)	81.5 (3.21)	92.5 (3.64)	156.0 (6.14)	184.8 (7.28)	205.4 (8.09)	310.6 (12.23)	362.3 (14.26)	215.5 (8.48)	233.4 (9.19)	94.6 (3.72)	104.4 (4.11)	68.3 (2.69)	2,109.3 (83.04)
Average snowfall cm (inches)	3 (1.2)	2 (0.8)	0 (0)	0 (0)	0 (0)	0 (0)	0 (0)	0 (0)	0 (0)	0 (0)	0 (0)	1 (0.4)	6 (2.4)
Average relative humidity (%)	64	66	68	76	79	86	88	84	79	70	67	65	74
Mean monthly sunshine hours	92.9	114.3	147.3	175.4	188.3	133.2	154.0	200.0	160.1	178.1	131.8	108.5	1,783.8
Source 1: Japan Meteorological Agency
Source 2: NOAA (1961-1990)

== Attractions ==
- Saikai National Park
- Hirado Castle

== Notable residents ==
- William Adams (1564–1620): Miura Anjin (三浦按針: "the pilot of Miura"), an English navigator and senior advisor to the Tokugawa shogunate, resided in Hirado during the 1610s and died there. He was the model for the character of John Blackthorne in James Clavell's novel Shōgun (1975).
- Camillus Costanzo (1571–1622): Italian Jesuit martyr. Burnt alive in Hirado.
- Richard Cocks (1565–1624): merchant of the British East India Company.
- Li Dan (d. 1625): Chinese merchant
- Koxinga (1624–1662): founder of Kingdom of Tungning and Southern Ming general. Born in Hirado.
- Kazuya Maekawa (1968–): former football player and current coach
- Inagaki Manjiro (1861–1908): Diplomat. Born in Hirado.
- Tagawa Matsu (1601–1646): wife of Zheng Zhilong, mother of Koxinga and Shichizaemon
- Willem Verstegen (1612–1659): merchant of the Dutch East India Company
- Ryusaku Yanagimoto (1894–1942): captain of the Sōryū in the Imperial Japanese Navy during World War II
- Zheng Zhilong (1604–1661): Chinese merchant and pirate, father of Koxinga

== See also ==
- Hirado, Nagasaki
- Japanese cruiser Hirado
- Hichiku dialect
