= Camillus Costanzo =

Italian soldier, Jesuit missionary, and martyr

Martyrdom of Camillus Costanzo

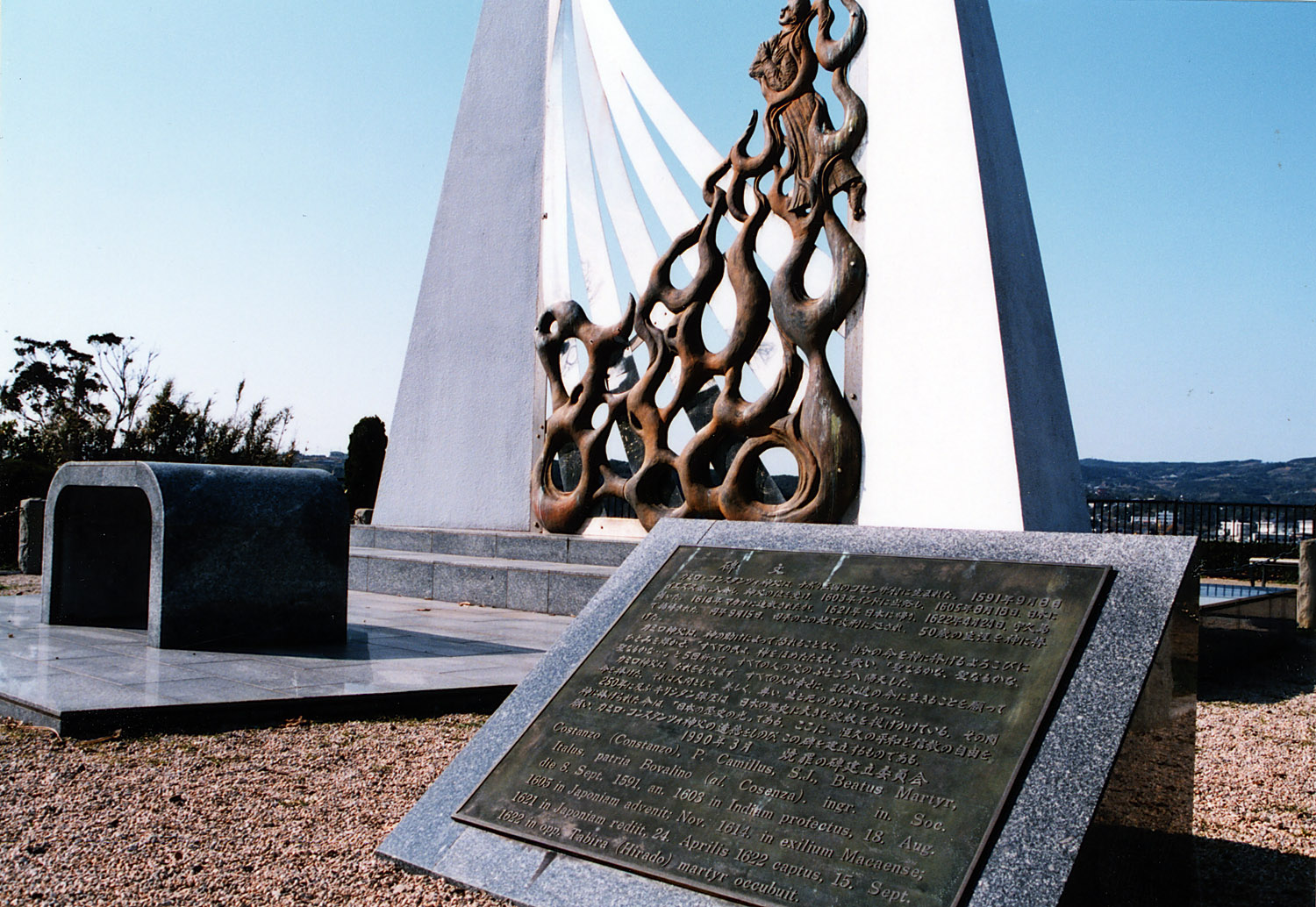
The monument to Costanzo Camillus, Jesuit martyr, located in the mainland part of the modern city of Hirado, formerly the town of Tabira

Camillus Costanzo SJ (Bovalino Superiore, 1571 – Hirado, Japan 15 September 1622) was an Italian soldier, law student and Jesuit missionary in Japan. When he was burned alive in 1622, he became a Roman Catholic martyr.

== Missionary ==
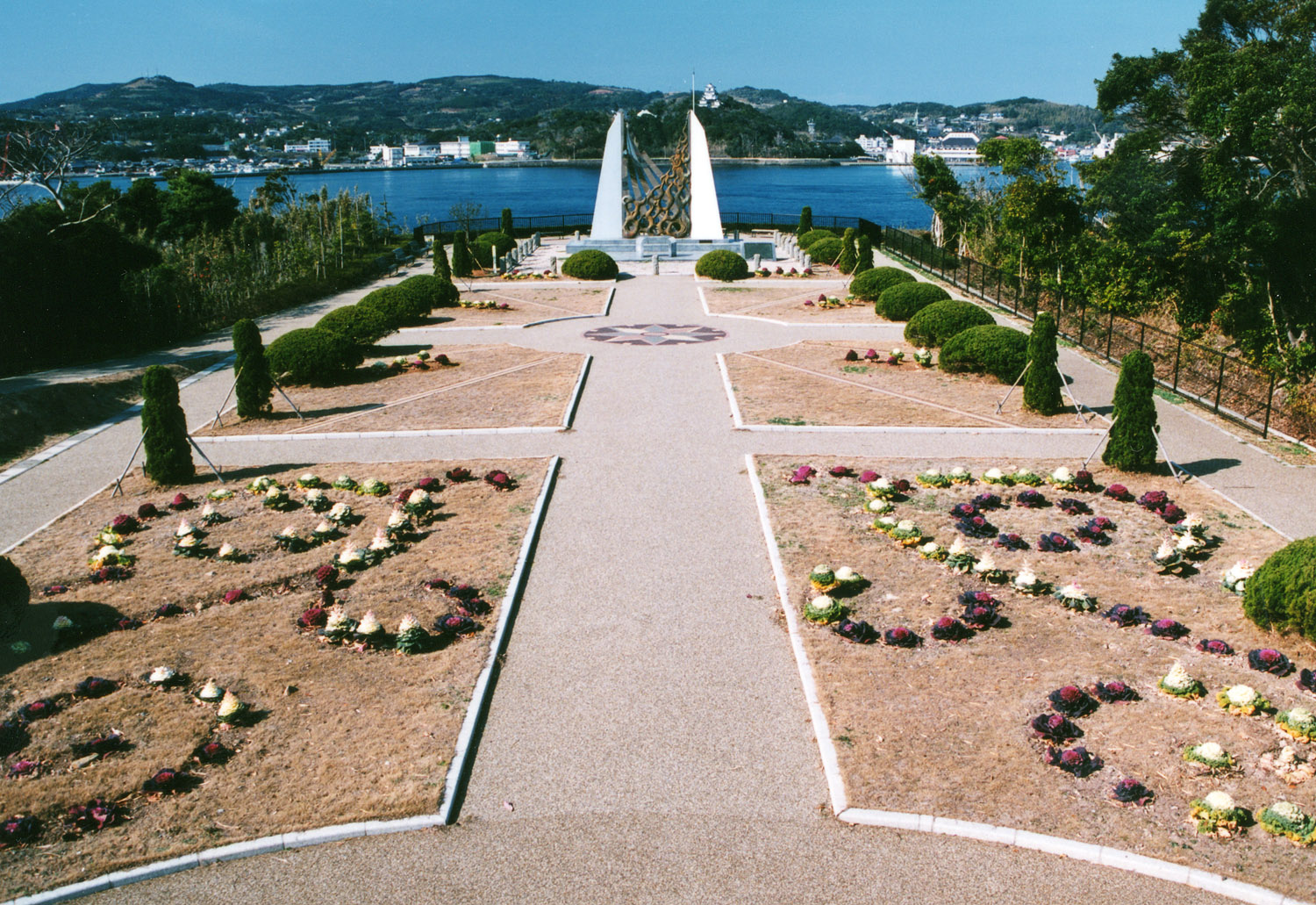
Park setting for the monument to Father Costanzo

The Jesuit Order sent Father Costanzo to China; but the Portuguese prevented his entrance into that country.

Instead, he went to Japan. He learned the Japanese language quickly; and he successfully encouraged converts in the region near the city of Sakai.

When all missionaries were banished from Japan, he went to Macau.

Despite the dangers involved in ignoring the Tokugawa shogunate's exclusionary laws (sakoku), he returned in 1621. Disguised as a soldier, he managed to elude capture until April 24, 1622 when he was arrested on the island of Hirado off the western coast of Kyushu.

He was condemned to death and was burned alive on September 15, 1622.

== Beatification ==
Father Costanzo was beatified by Pope Pius IX on May 7, 1867.
