= Hirado, Nagasaki =

Hirado 平戸市
- City
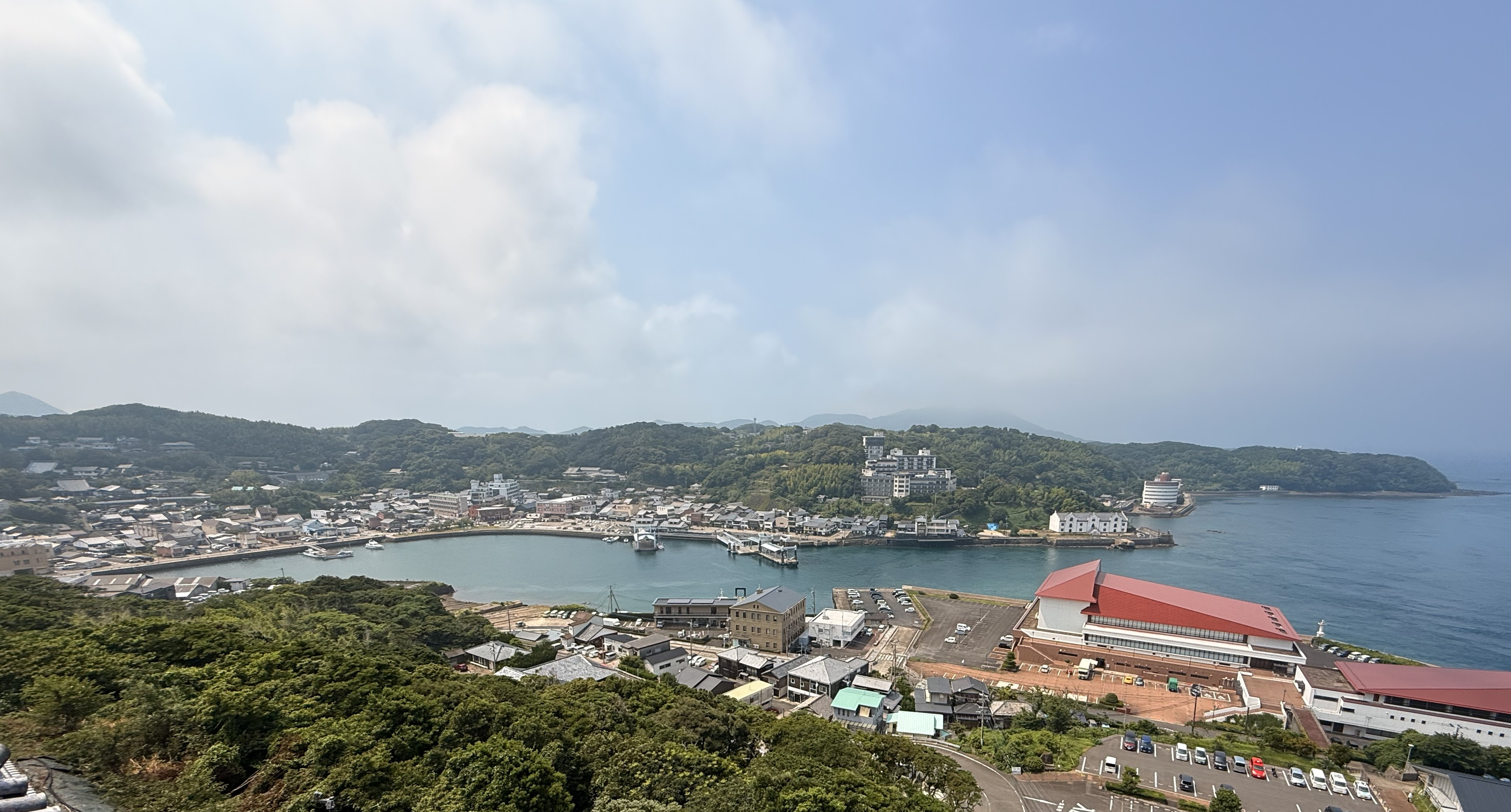
- View of Hirado port from the castle

- Flag Emblem
- Interactive map of Hirado
- Location in Japan
- Coordinates: 33°22′05″N 129°33′13″E
- Country: Japan
- Region: Kyushu
- Prefecture: Nagasaki

Government
  - Mayor: Naruhiko Kuroda (since October 2009)

Area
  - Total: 235.12 km^{2} (90.78 sq mi)

Population (June 1, 2024)
  - Total: 28,172
  - Density: 119.82/km^{2} (310.33/sq mi)
- Time zone: UTC+09:00 (JST)
- City hall address: 1508-3 Iwanoue, Hirado-shi, Nagasaki-ken 859-5192
- Climate: Cfa
- Website: Official website
- Symbols
- Flower: Hirado Rhododendron
- Tree: Podocarpaceae

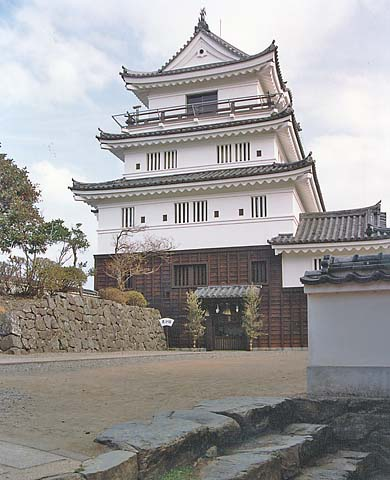
Hirado Castle

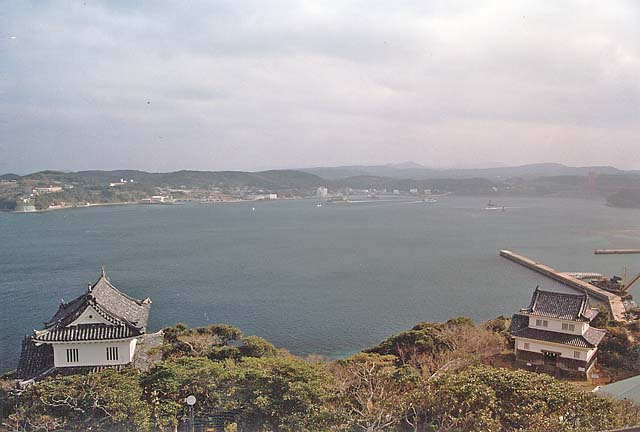
View of Hirado bay from Hirado castle

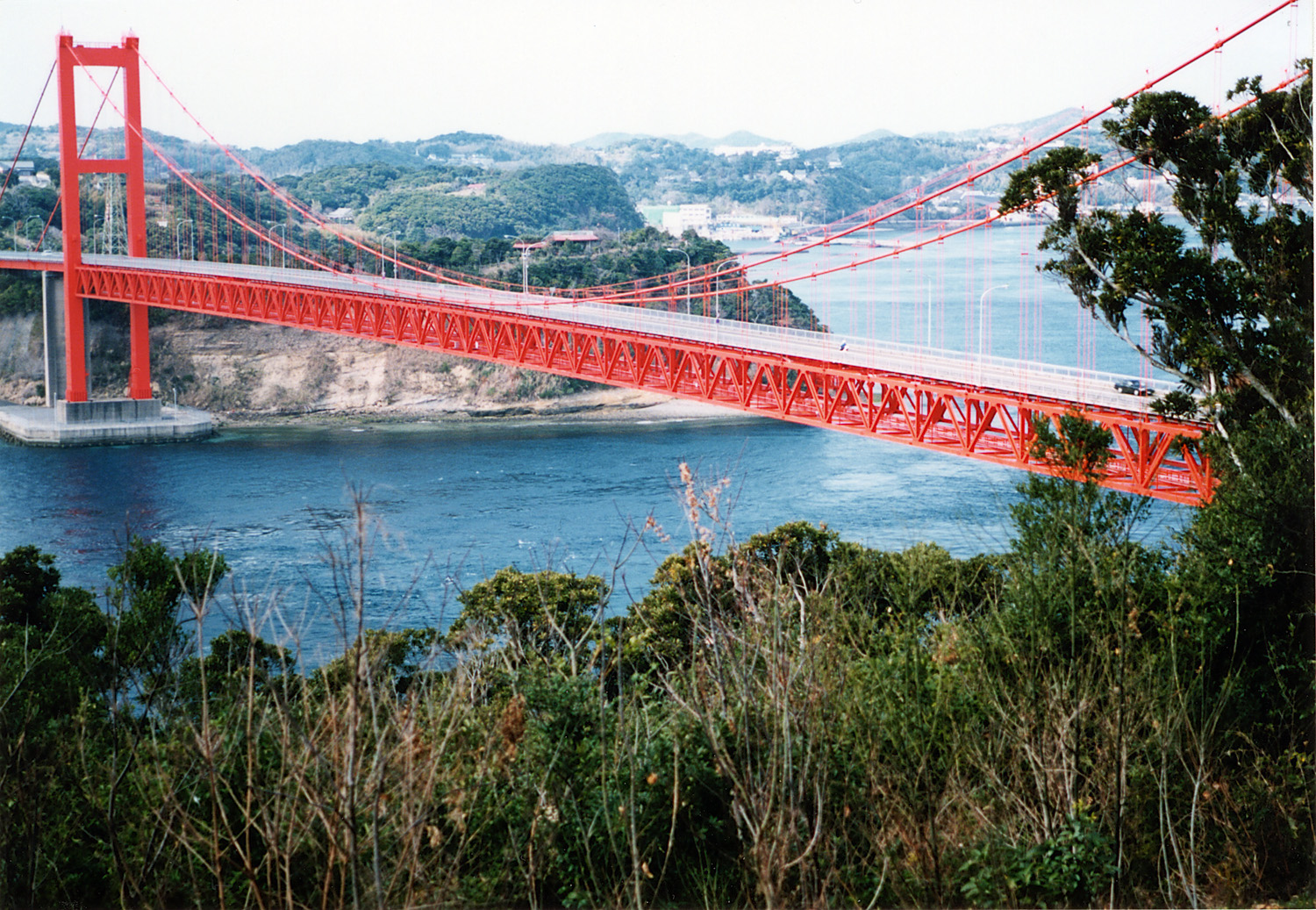
Hirado Bridge

Hirado (平戸市, Hirado-shi) is a city located in Nagasaki Prefecture, Japan. As of 1 June 2024, the city had an estimated population of 28,172, and a population density of 120 people per km^{2}. The total area of the city is 235.12 km^{2} (90.78 sq mi).

Historically, Hirado had been an important port city and a gateway for foreign trade between Japan and Europe, especially during the 16th–17th centuries. Its rich history blends samurai culture, foreign influence, and maritime trade. Today, Hirado is also recognized for its role in Japan's early international connections, as part of the broader UNESCO World Heritage Sites related to Hidden Christian Sites in the Nagasaki Region.

== Geography ==
Hirado City occupies the northern part of Nagasaki Prefecture, the northwestern tip of the Kitamatsuura Peninsula, Hirado Island, which lies to the west of the peninsula across the Hirado Strait, Ikitsuki Island, which lies to the northwest of Hirado Island, Takushima Island, which lies directly north of Hirado Island, and Matoyama-Oshima Island, which lies directly north of Tsushima. It is located about 25 kilometers northwest of Sasebo City and about 80 kilometers north-northwest of Nagasaki City. The Hirado Bridge connects Hirado Island to the Kyushu mainland, and the Ikitsuki Bridge connects Hirado Island to Ikitsuki Island.

The western end of Hirado Island is west of Kōzakihana, the westernmost point of Kyushu, and is the westernmost of all areas that can be traveled between the mainland of Japan (Hokkaido, Honshu, Shikoku, and Kyushu) or the mainland of Japan by land transportation alone.

=== Surrounding municipalities ===
Nagasaki Prefecture

- Matsuura
- Sasebo

== Climate ==
Hirado has a humid subtropical climate (Köppen:Cfa) with hot summers and cool winters. Precipitation is significant throughout the year, but is much higher in the summer, although the relatively low latitude and its coastal location the city receives snow in small quantities but enough to "mark" the winter every year despite being in 33 ° N receives intrusions from the Arctic cold of the Siberia air combined with the humidity of the Sea of Japan.

Climate data for Hirado (1991−2020 normals, extremes 1940−present)
Month	Jan	Feb	Mar	Apr	May	Jun	Jul	Aug	Sep	Oct	Nov	Dec	Year
Record high °C (°F)	18.7 (65.7)	20.4 (68.7)	22.3 (72.1)	25.7 (78.3)	29.3 (84.7)	31.2 (88.2)	34.5 (94.1)	35.1 (95.2)	34.0 (93.2)	30.1 (86.2)	26.9 (80.4)	23.1 (73.6)	35.1 (95.2)
Mean maximum °C (°F)	15.5 (59.9)	17.1 (62.8)	19.3 (66.7)	22.8 (73.0)	26.0 (78.8)	27.8 (82.0)	31.8 (89.2)	32.8 (91.0)	30.6 (87.1)	26.4 (79.5)	22.3 (72.1)	17.8 (64.0)	33.1 (91.6)
Mean daily maximum °C (°F)	9.6 (49.3)	10.6 (51.1)	13.5 (56.3)	17.7 (63.9)	21.6 (70.9)	24.1 (75.4)	27.8 (82.0)	29.6 (85.3)	26.3 (79.3)	22.1 (71.8)	17.2 (63.0)	12.1 (53.8)	19.3 (66.8)
Daily mean °C (°F)	7.0 (44.6)	7.6 (45.7)	10.3 (50.5)	14.2 (57.6)	18.0 (64.4)	21.1 (70.0)	25.1 (77.2)	26.5 (79.7)	23.5 (74.3)	19.2 (66.6)	14.2 (57.6)	9.3 (48.7)	16.3 (61.4)
Mean daily minimum °C (°F)	4.4 (39.9)	4.7 (40.5)	7.1 (44.8)	11.0 (51.8)	15.0 (59.0)	18.9 (66.0)	23.2 (73.8)	24.2 (75.6)	21.2 (70.2)	16.4 (61.5)	11.1 (52.0)	6.4 (43.5)	13.6 (56.6)
Mean minimum °C (°F)	−0.3 (31.5)	0.0 (32.0)	1.8 (35.2)	5.9 (42.6)	10.9 (51.6)	15.5 (59.9)	19.9 (67.8)	21.2 (70.2)	16.9 (62.4)	11.4 (52.5)	5.7 (42.3)	1.6 (34.9)	−1.2 (29.8)
Record low °C (°F)	−5.7 (21.7)	−5.8 (21.6)	−4.0 (24.8)	1.8 (35.2)	7.3 (45.1)	12.4 (54.3)	16.1 (61.0)	17.0 (62.6)	13.6 (56.5)	5.9 (42.6)	1.7 (35.1)	−3.6 (25.5)	−5.8 (21.6)
Average precipitation mm (inches)	84.9 (3.34)	93.6 (3.69)	148.7 (5.85)	189.0 (7.44)	198.4 (7.81)	319.0 (12.56)	345.7 (13.61)	289.1 (11.38)	223.5 (8.80)	116.6 (4.59)	112.3 (4.42)	85.3 (3.36)	2,206.1 (86.85)
Average snowfall cm (inches)	0 (0)	1 (0.4)	0 (0)	0 (0)	0 (0)	0 (0)	0 (0)	0 (0)	0 (0)	0 (0)	0 (0)	0 (0)	1 (0.4)
Average rainy days	8.6	8.3	9.9	9.6	8.8	12.1	11.9	9.9	9.6	6.7	8.1	8.0	111.5
Average snowy days	0	0.2	0	0	0	0	0	0	0	0	0.1	0	0.3
Average relative humidity (%)	65	65	69	74	79	87	89	85	81	72	69	65	75
Mean monthly sunshine hours	94.0	115.8	157.7	179.0	194.3	125.3	146.9	196.7	158.9	174.6	132.8	104.6	1,780.6
Source: Japan Meteorological Agency

=== Demographics ===
Per Japanese census data, the population of Hirado is as shown below:

Historical population
Year	Pop.	±%
1940	53,473	—
1950	69,121	+29.3%
1960	67,880	−1.8%
1970	55,661	−18.0%
1980	50,849	−8.6%
1990	46,572	−8.4%
2000	41,586	−10.7%
2010	34,905	−16.1%
2020	29,365	−15.9%

== History ==
Hirado has been a port of call for ships between the East Asian mainland and Japan since the Nara period. During the Kamakura and Muromachi periods, the local Matsuura clan held the rights to trade with Korea and with Song-dynasty China. During the Sengoku and early Edo periods, Hirado's role as a center of foreign trade increased, especially vis-à-vis Ming-dynasty China and the Dutch East India Company (Vereenigde Oostindische Compagnie or VOC). The Portuguese arrived in Japan in 1543; after the Battle of Fukuda Bay in 1561 the Portuguese stayed for a few more years until they settled in the city of Nagasaki in 1571. The English and Dutch initially reached Japan at the beginning of the 17th century. The first step in the profitable Dutch-Japanese trading relationship was the Shōgun's grant of a trading pass (handelspas) in 1609. In 1613, the British ship Clove arrived in Japan and its Captain John Saris was able to gain the shogunate's permission to establish in Hirado a commercial house of the British East India Company. However, the company soon came to consider this outpost to be unprofitable, especially due to their inability to obtain Japanese raw silk for import to China. Therefore, the British closed their factory in 1623, voluntarily leaving the Dutch as the sole European presence.

At its maximum extent, the Dutch trading center covered the whole area of present-day Sakikata Park. In 1637 and in 1639, stone warehouses were constructed, and the Dutch builders incorporated these dates into the stonework. However, the Tokugawa shogunate disapproved of the use of any Christian year dates, and therefore demanded the immediate destruction of these two structures. This failure to comply with strict sakoku practices was then used as one of the Shogunate's rationales for forcing the Dutch traders to abandon Hirado for the more constricting confines of Dejima, a small artificial island in the present-day city of Nagasaki. The last VOC Opperhoofd or Kapitan at Hirado and the first one at Dejima was François Caron, who oversaw the transfer in 1641. Modern research indicated this incident might have been an excuse for the Shogunate to take the Dutch trade away from the Hirado clan. The stone warehouse from 1639 that was torn down was reconstructed back to its original form in 2011.

During the Edo period, Hirado was the seat of the Hirado Domain. Hirado Castle is today a historical and architectural landmark.

Following the Meiji restoration, the town of Hirado and the villages of Hirado, Nakano, Shishi, Himosashi, Nakatsura, Tsuyoshi, Shijiki, Tahibira, Minami-Tabira, Ikitsuki and Oshima were established with the creation of the modern municipalities system on April 1, 1889. The village and town of Hirado merged on April 1, 1925. Ikitsuki was raised to town status on April 17, 1940. On April 1, 1954 Tabira and Minami-Tabira merged to form the town of Tabira. On January 1, 1955 - Hirado Town, and the villages of Nakano, Shishi, Himosashi, Nakatsura, Tsuyoshi, and Shijiki merged to form the city of Hirado. The city expanded by merging on October 1, 2005, with the neighboring towns of Tabira, Ikitsuki, and the village of Ōshima. The local economy is dominated by agriculture, fishing and food processing.

== Government ==
Hirado has a mayor-council form of government with a directly elected mayor and a unicameral city council of 18 members. Hirado contributes one member to the Nagasaki Prefectural Assembly. In terms of national politics, the city is part of the Nagasaki 3rd district of the lower house of the Diet of Japan. The city was previously part of Nagasaki 4th district, which was abolished in 2022.

== Economy ==
The economy of Hirado is heavily dependent on commercial fishing, agriculture and tourism.

== Education ==
Hirado has 15 public elementary schools and eight public junior high schools, and three public high schools operated by the Nagasaki Prefectural Board of Education.

== Transportation ==
=== Railways ===
Matsuura Railway - Nishi-Kyūshū Line

- Higashi-Tabira - Naka-Tabira - Tabira-Hiradoguchi - Nishi-Tabira

=== Highways ===
- Nishi-Kyūshū Expressway
- National Route 204
- National Route 383

== UNESCO World Heritage Site Listing ==
Hirado is part of the Hidden Christian Sites in the Nagasaki Region, a UNESCO World Heritage Site inscribed in 2018. This designation recognizes locations where Japanese Christians practiced their faith in secret during the period of national isolation (Sakoku) from the early 17th to the late 19th century. The sites in Hirado, including Kasuga Village and other sacred places, illustrate how Christian communities adapted and preserved their religious practices despite persecution. These locations include churches, memorials, cemeteries, and other cultural landscapes associated with the Hidden Christians, highlighting both the resilience of religious faith under oppression and the cultural exchanges between Japan and Europe during the early modern period.

== Sister cities ==
Hirado has one sister city in Japan and one sister city and one friendship city outside Japan.

- Zentsūji, Kagawa, Japan (sister city)
- Nan'an, Fujian, China (friendship city)
- Noordwijk, South Holland, Netherlands (sister city) (previously with Noordwijkerhout, which lost its municipal status in 2019 when it merged with Noordwijk)

== Local attractions ==
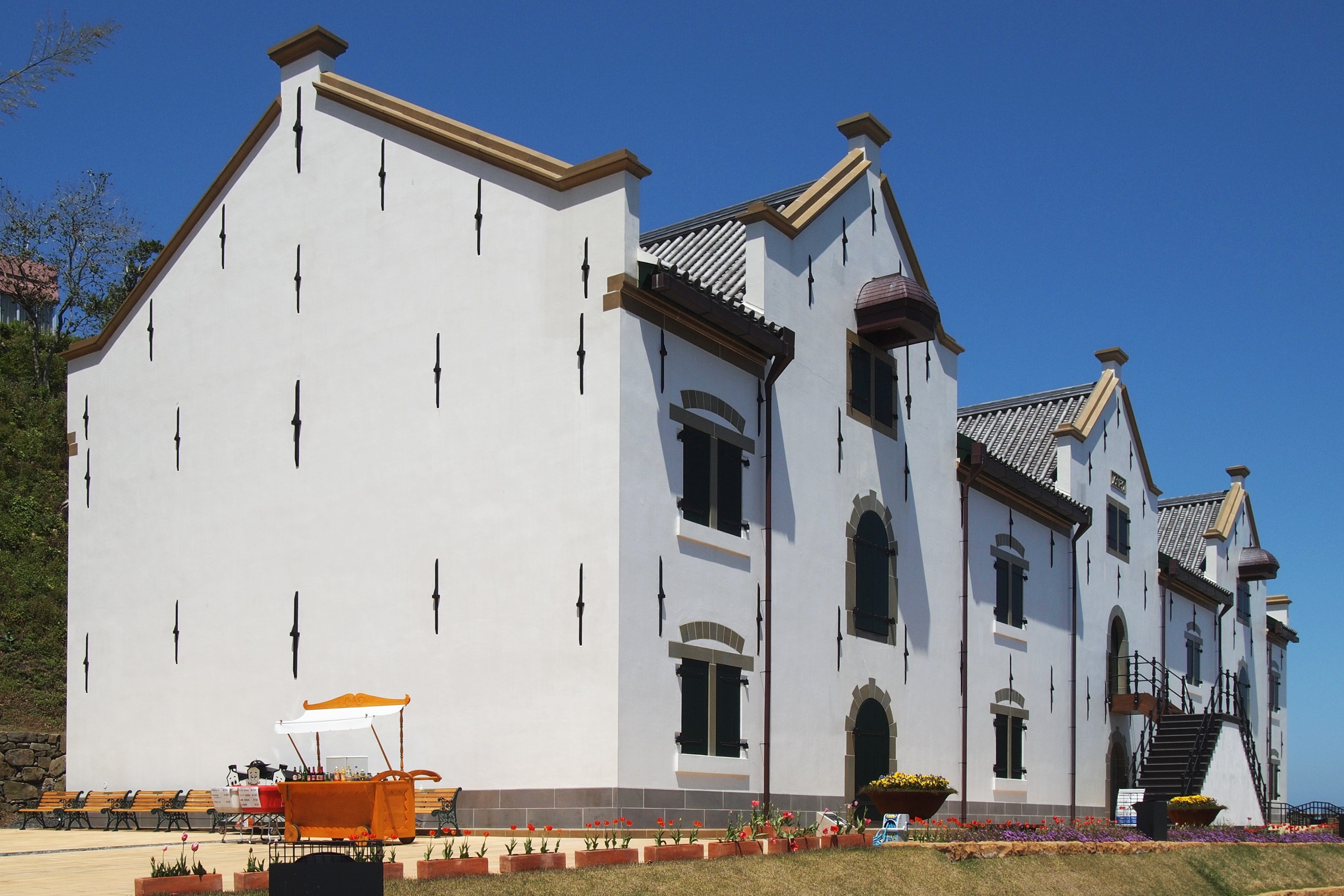
Hirado Dutch Trading Post

- Hirado Castle
- Hirado Dutch Trading Post, National Historic Site
- Matsura Historical Museum
- Hidden Christian Sites in the Nagasaki Region, Kasuga Village and Sacred Places in Hirado

== Notable residents of Hirado ==
- William Adams (1564–1620): Miura Anjin (三浦按針: "the pilot of Miura"), an English navigator and senior advisor to the Tokugawa shogunate, resided in Hirado during the 1610s and died there. He was the model for the character of John Blackthorne in James Clavell's novel Shōgun (1975).
- Camillus Costanzo (1571–1622): Italian Jesuit martyr. Burnt alive in Hirado.
- Richard Cocks (1565–1624): merchant of the British East India Company.
- Li Dan (d. 1625): Chinese merchant
- Koxinga (1624–1662): founder of Kingdom of Tungning and Southern Ming general. Born in Hirado.
- Kazuya Maekawa (1968–): former football player and current coach
- Inagaki Manjiro (1861–1908): Diplomat. Born in Hirado.
- Tagawa Matsu (1601–1646): wife of Zheng Zhilong, mother of Koxinga and Shichizaemon
- Willem Verstegen (1612–1659): merchant of the Dutch East India Company
- Ryusaku Yanagimoto (1894–1942): captain of the Sōryū in the Imperial Japanese Navy during World War II
- Zheng Zhilong (1604–1661): Chinese merchant and pirate, father of Koxinga

== Gallery ==
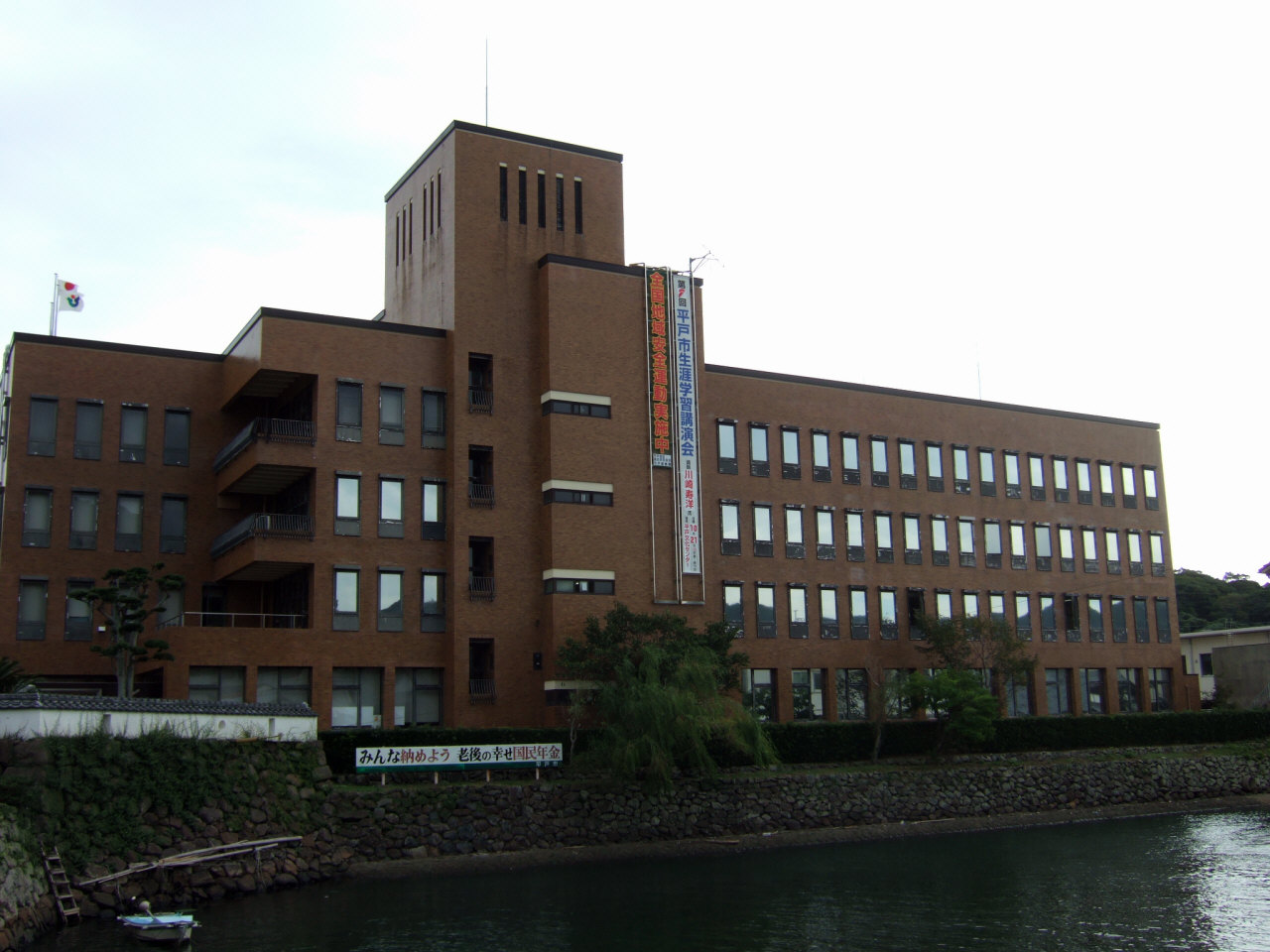
Hirado City Hall

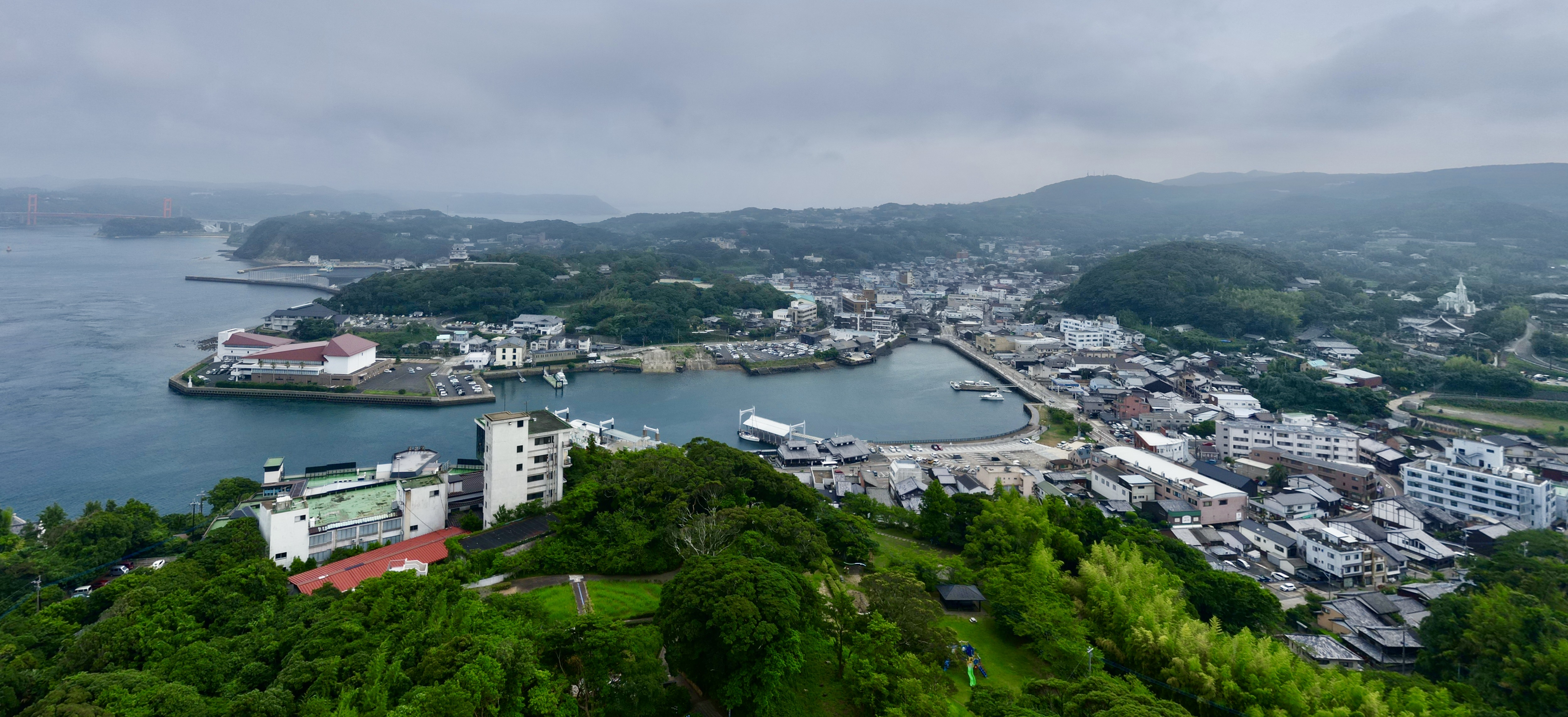
Aerial Panoramic of Hirado Port with Hirado Castle in background

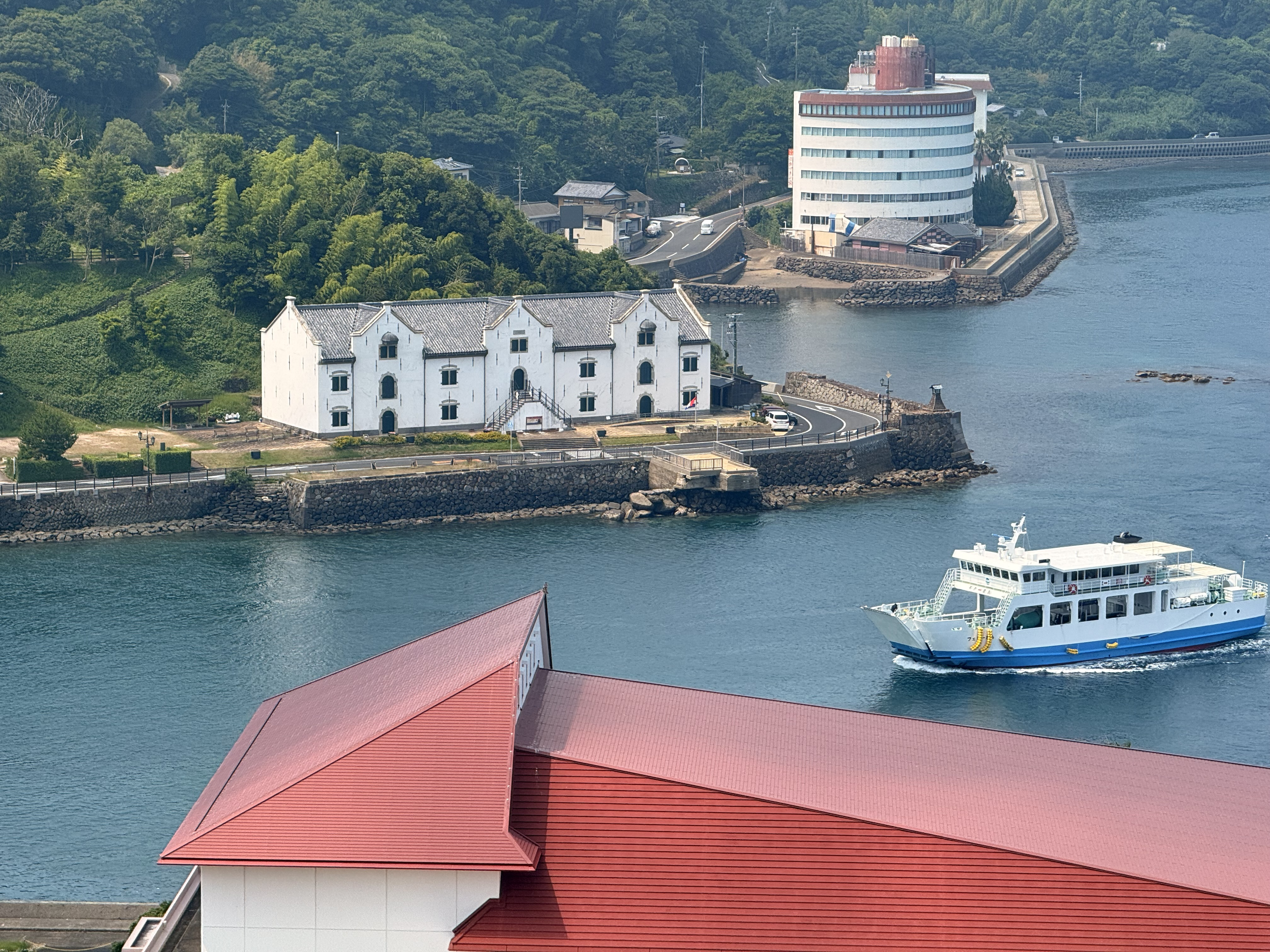
Dutch Trading House from Hirado Castle

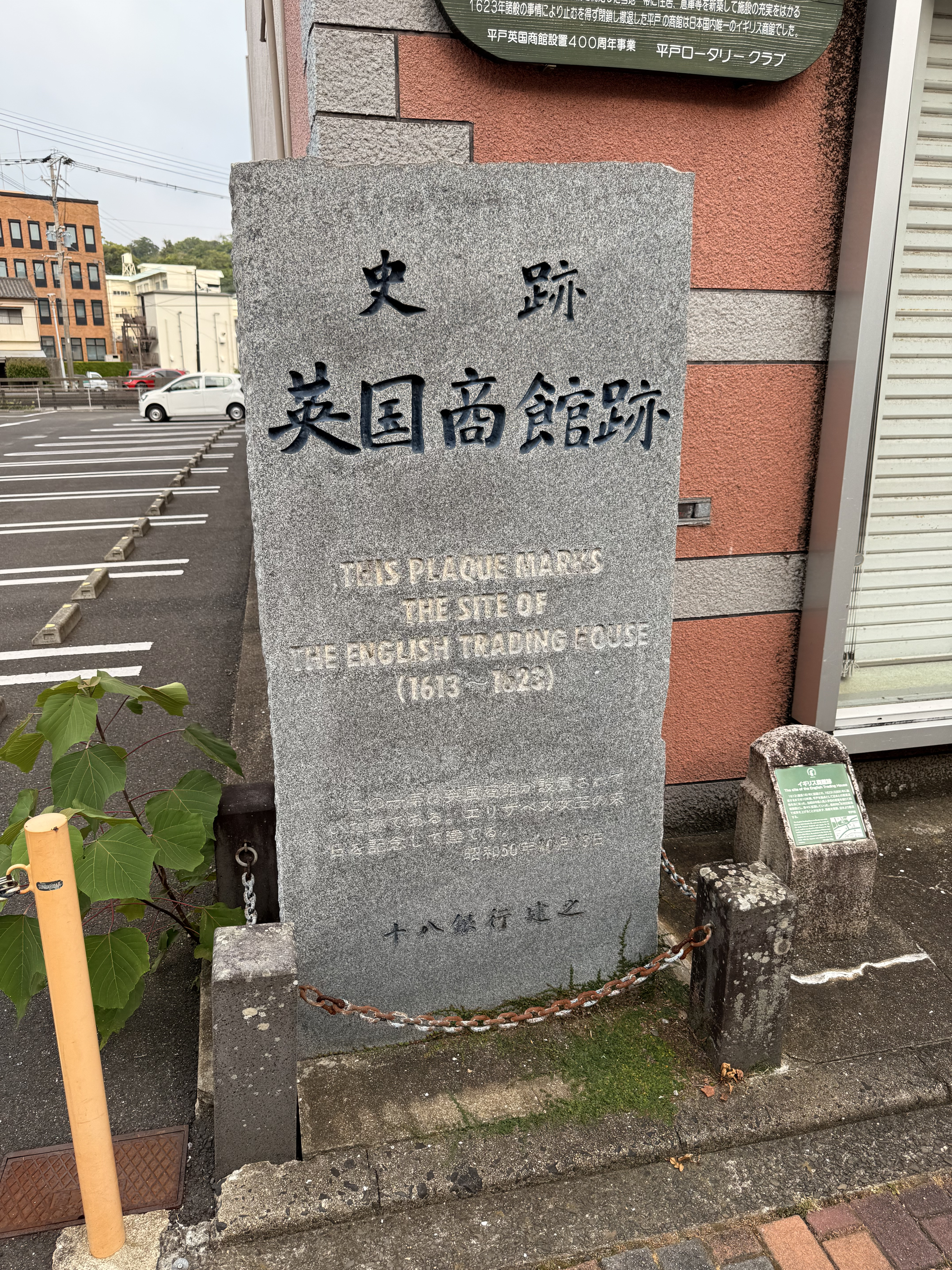
Hirado English trading site commemorative marker

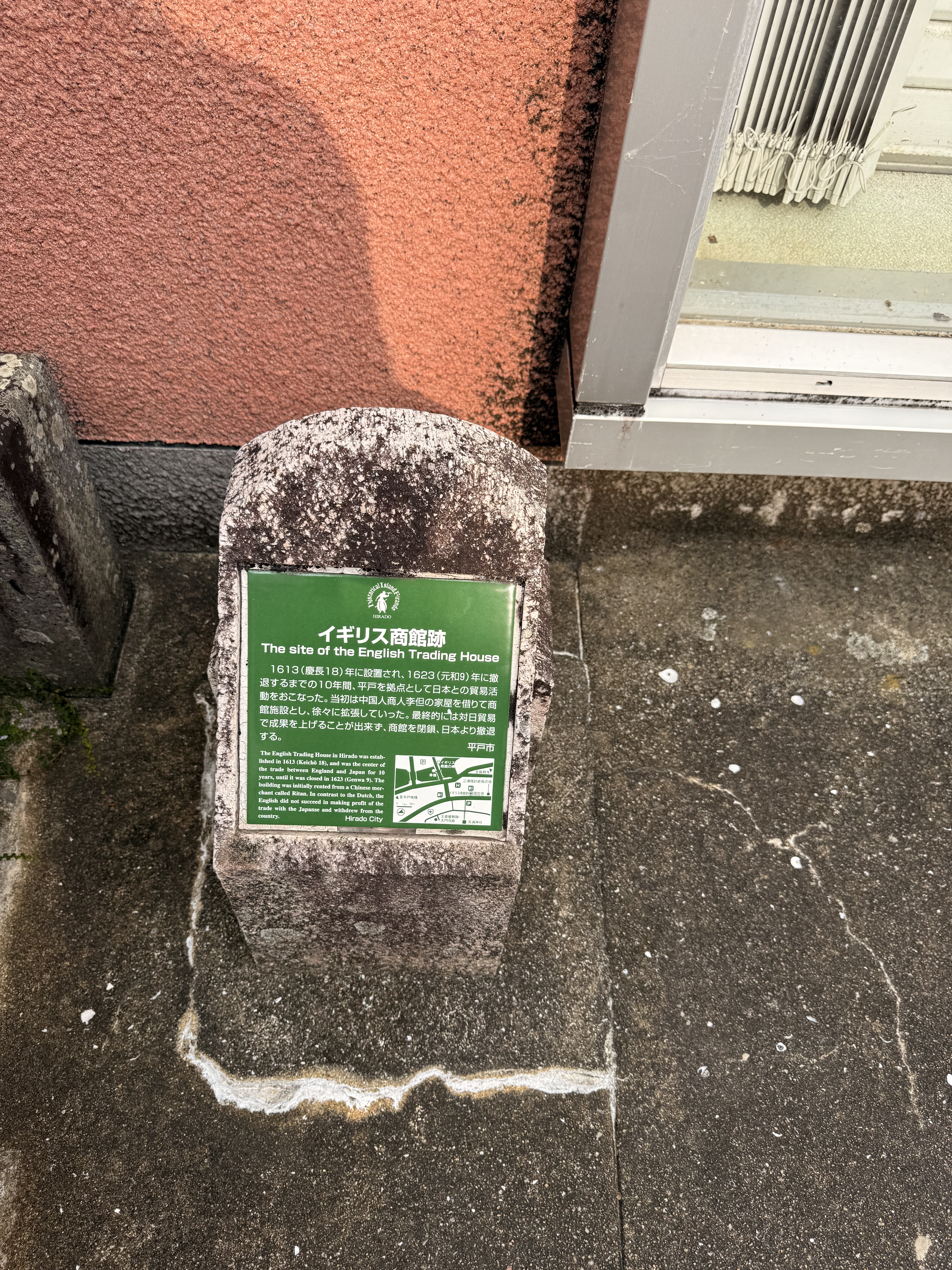
English Trading Site Location Sign in Hirado

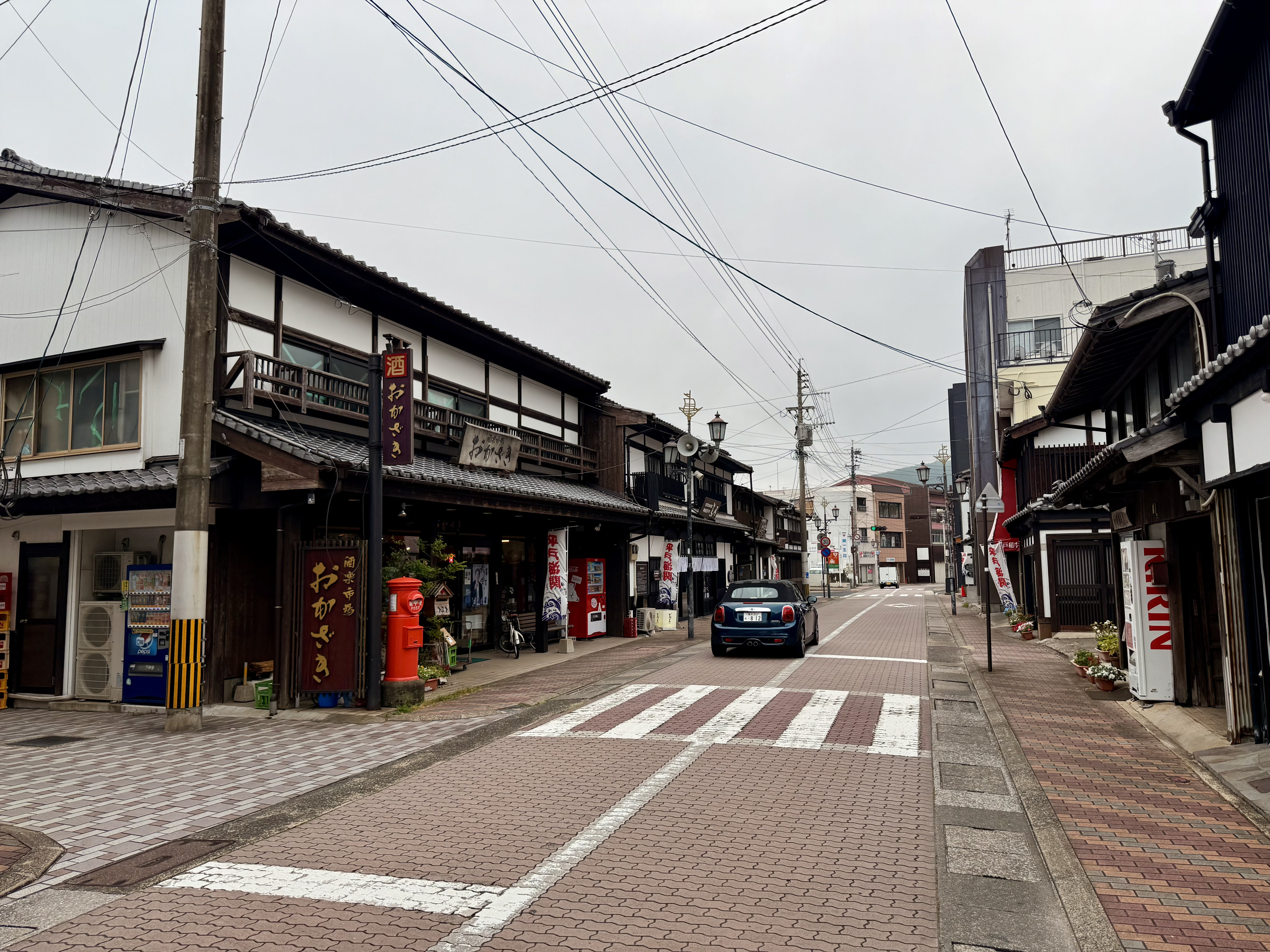
English trading area in Hirado from 1613-1623

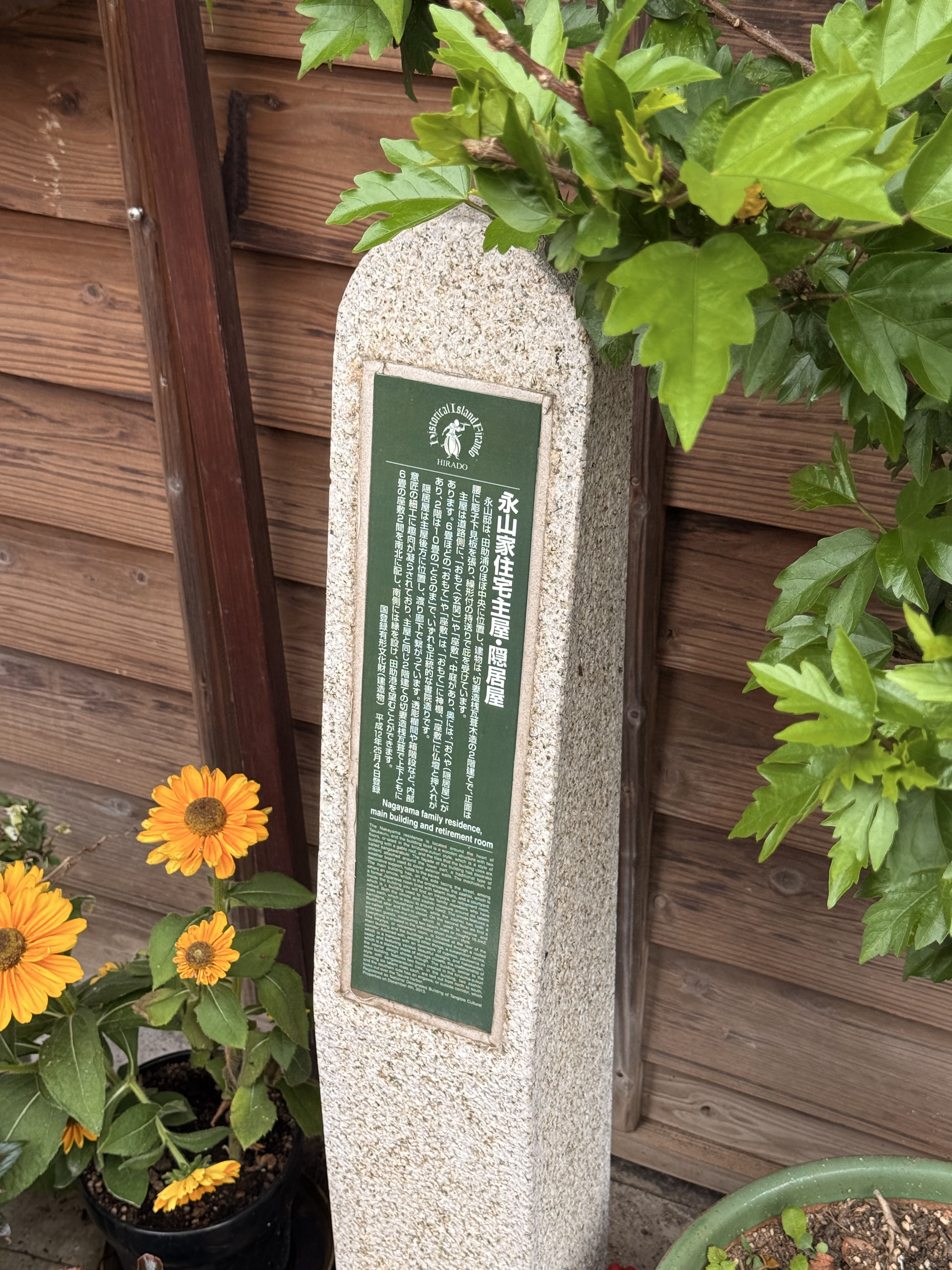
Nakayama Family Residence sign in Hirado historical area

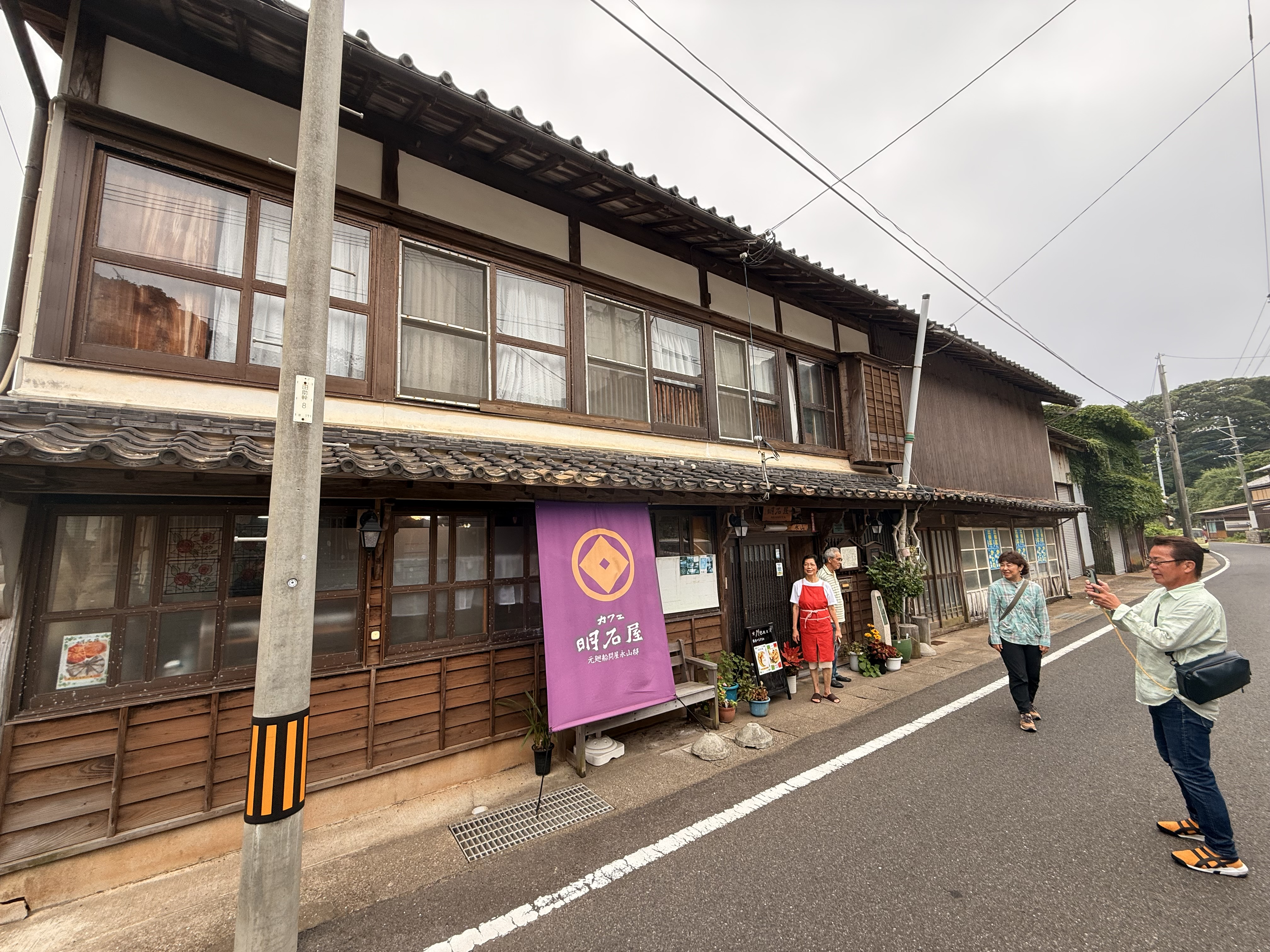
Nakayama Family Residence in Hirado historical area

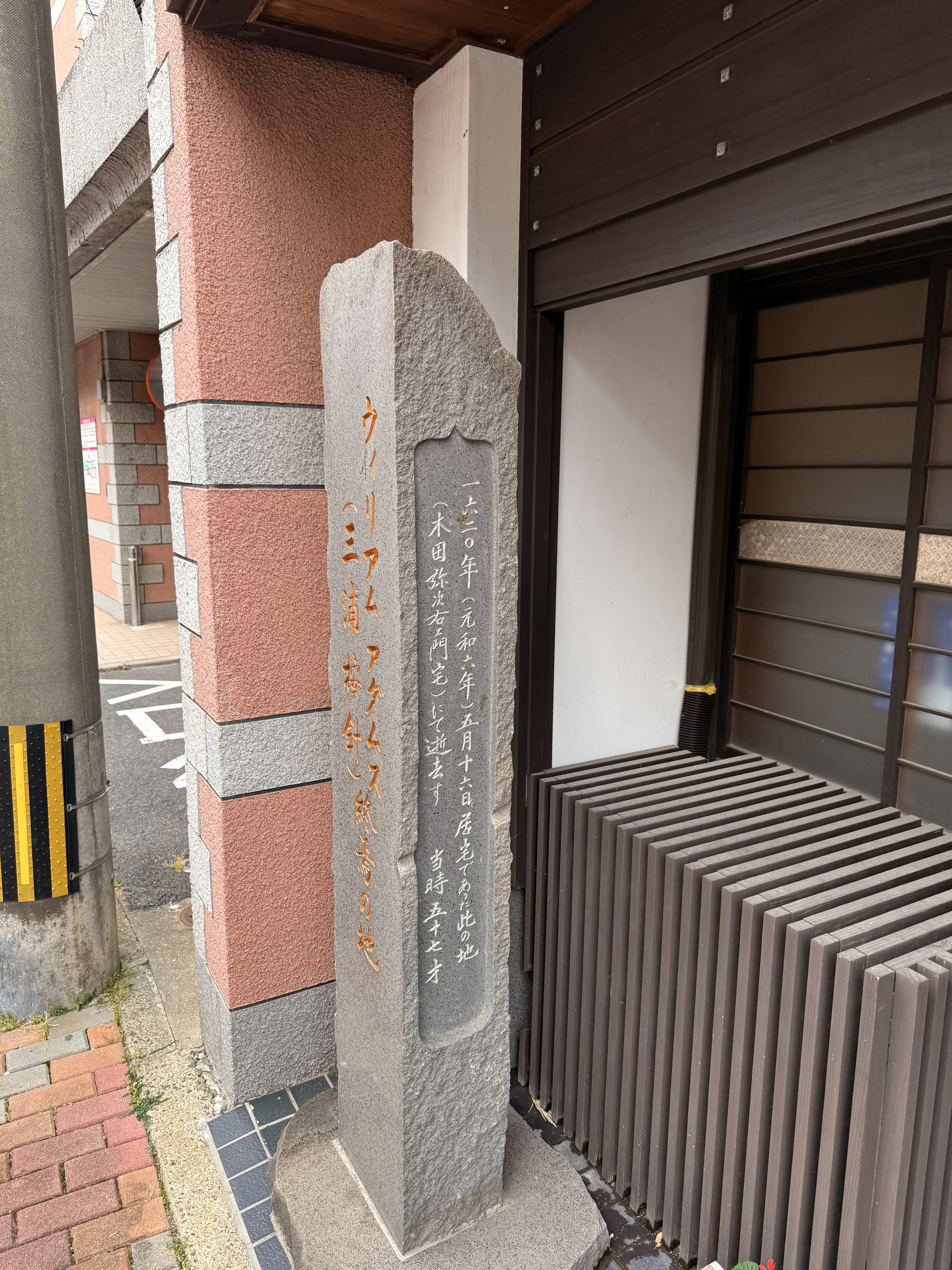
Location where William Adams died in Hirado

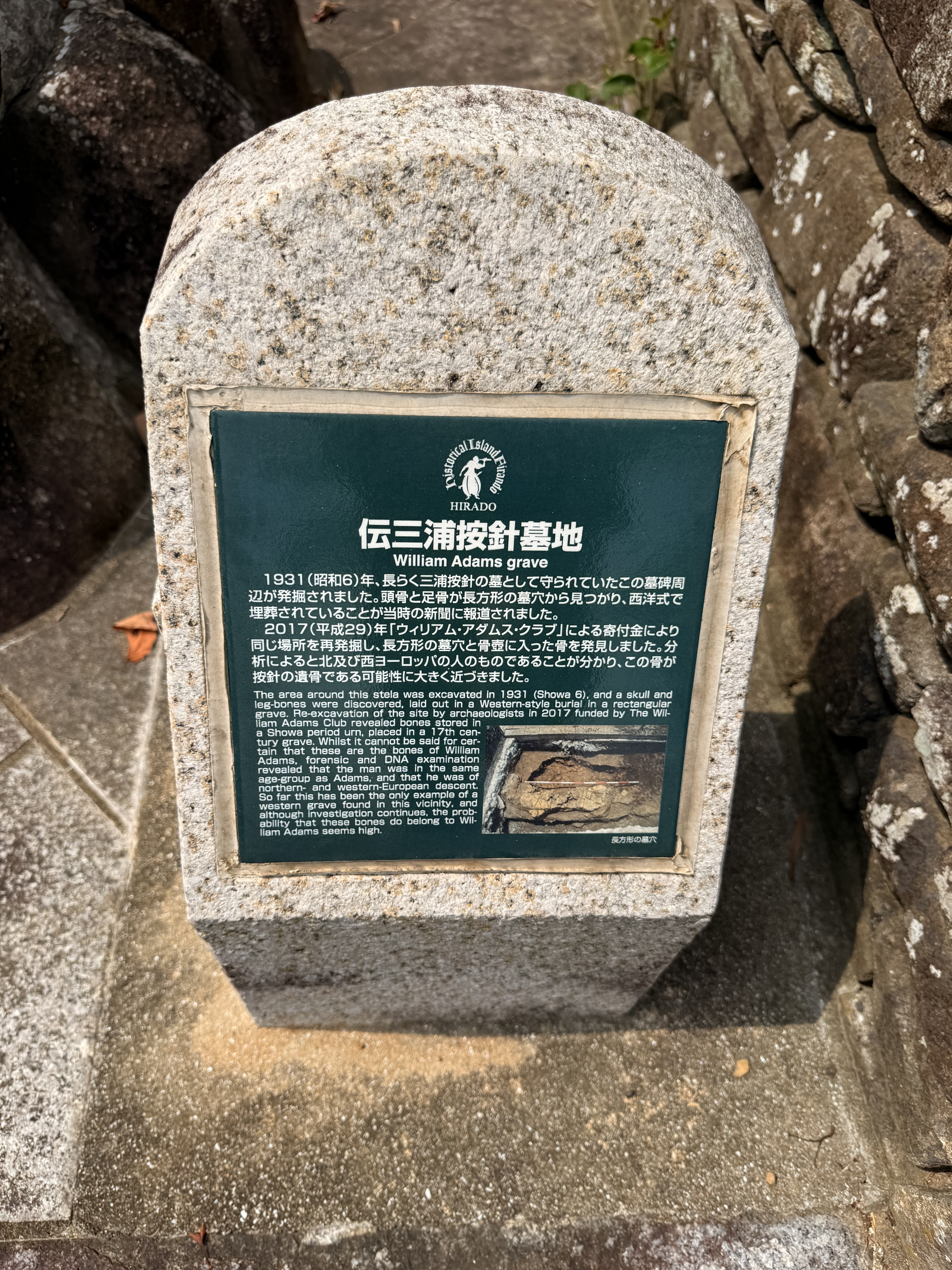
William Adams grave site sign

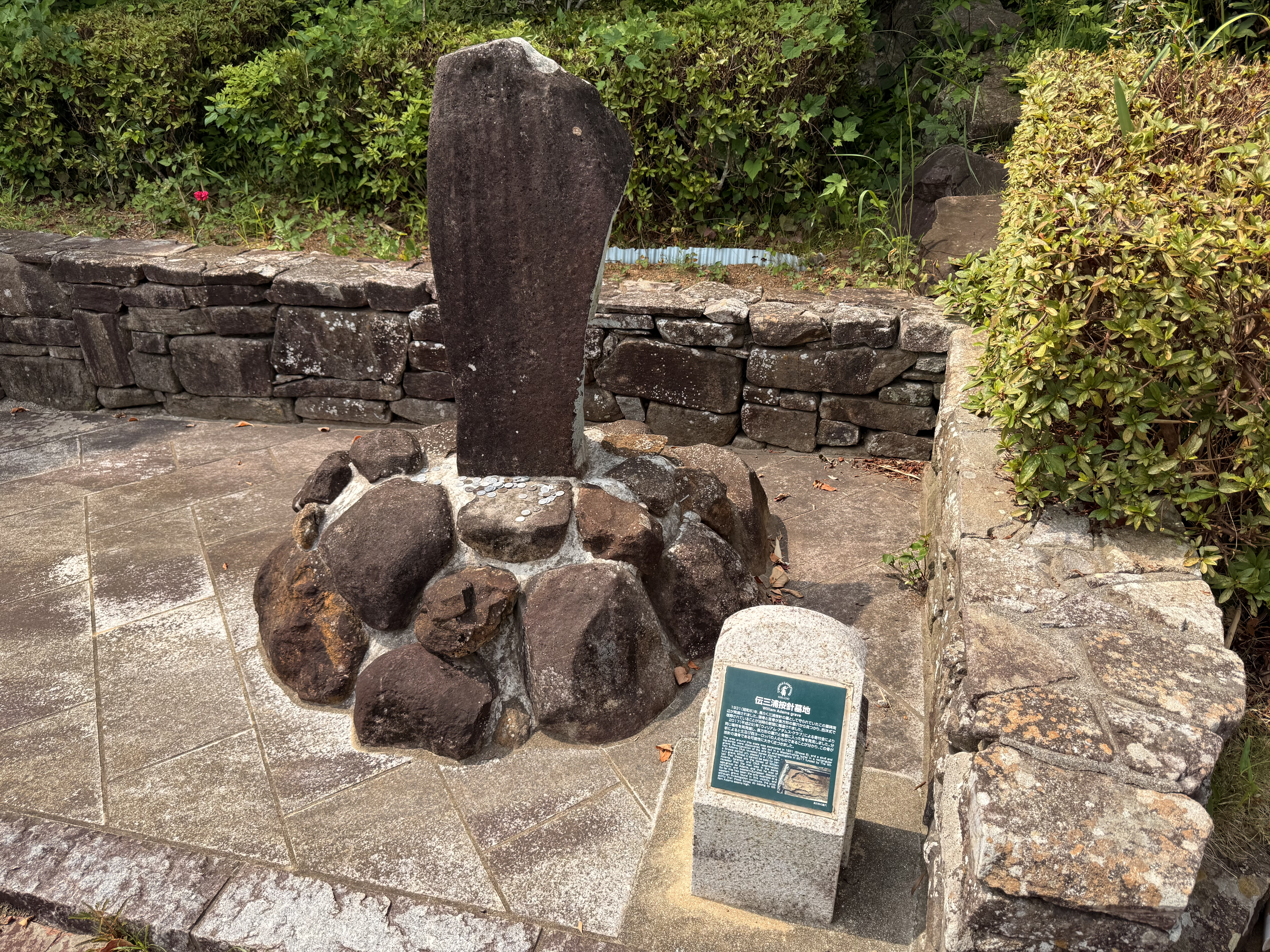
William Adams Grave Stone in Hirado

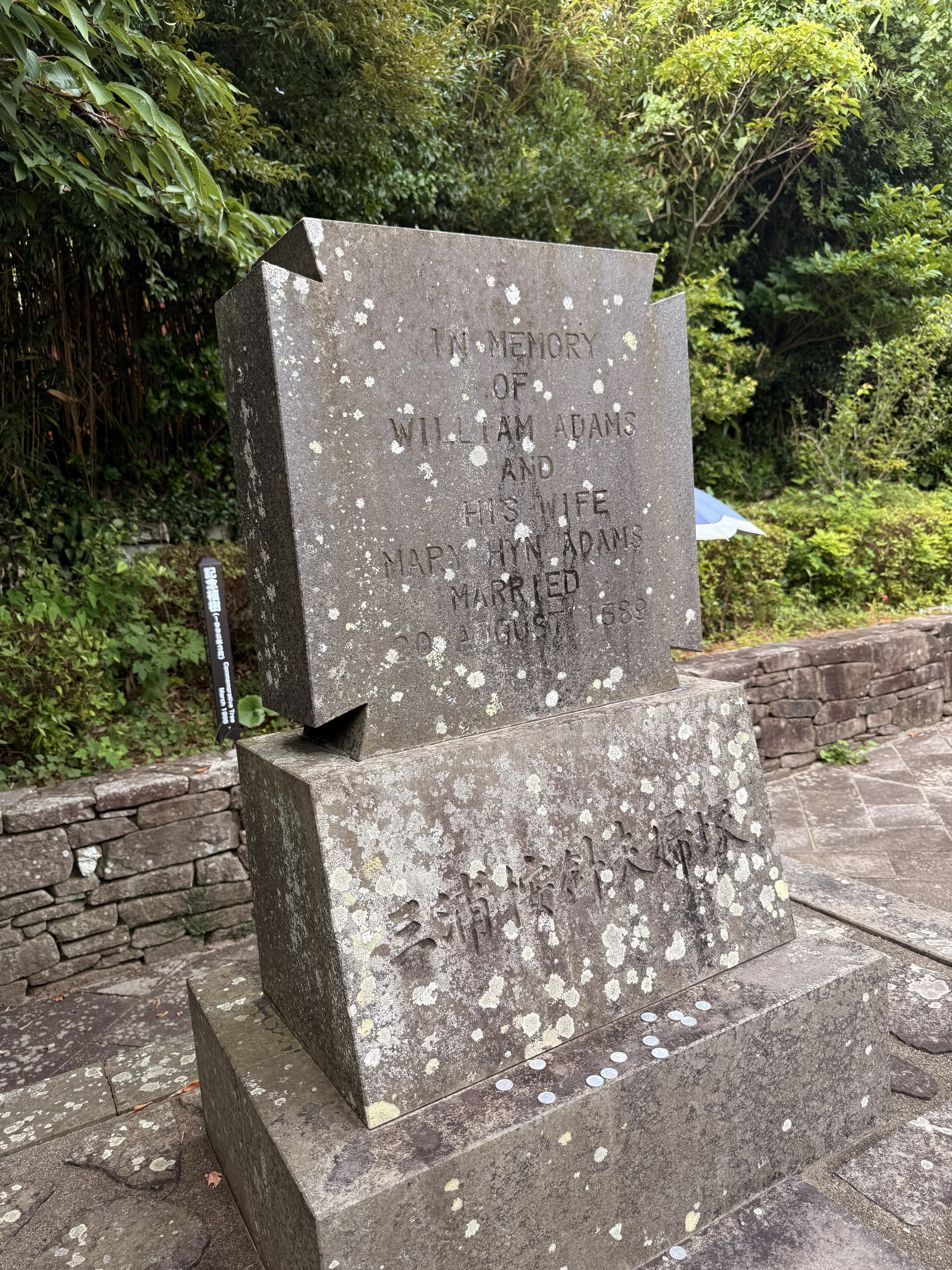
William Adams Gravestone noting English Wife

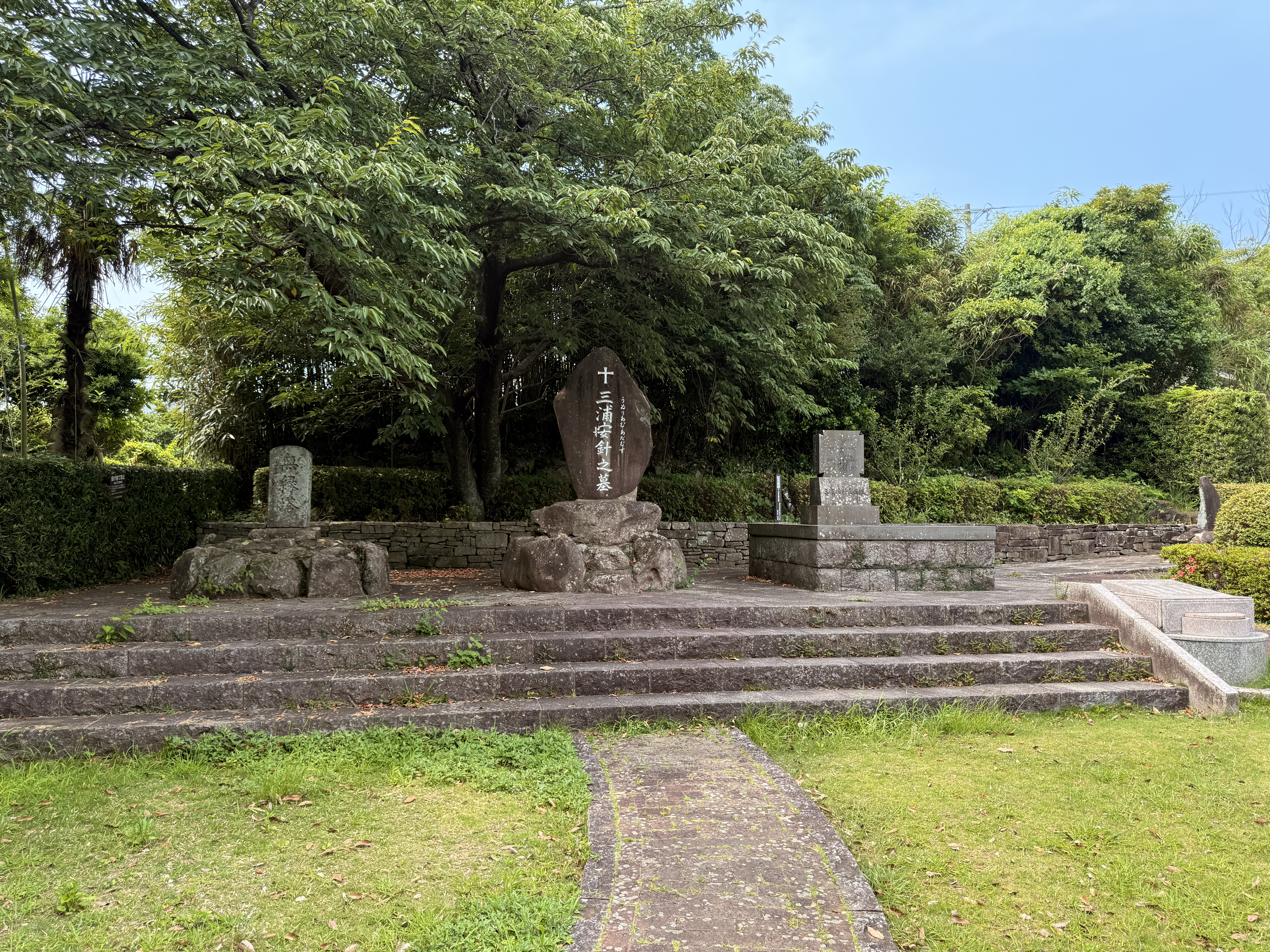
William Adams Grave Site Area in Hirado

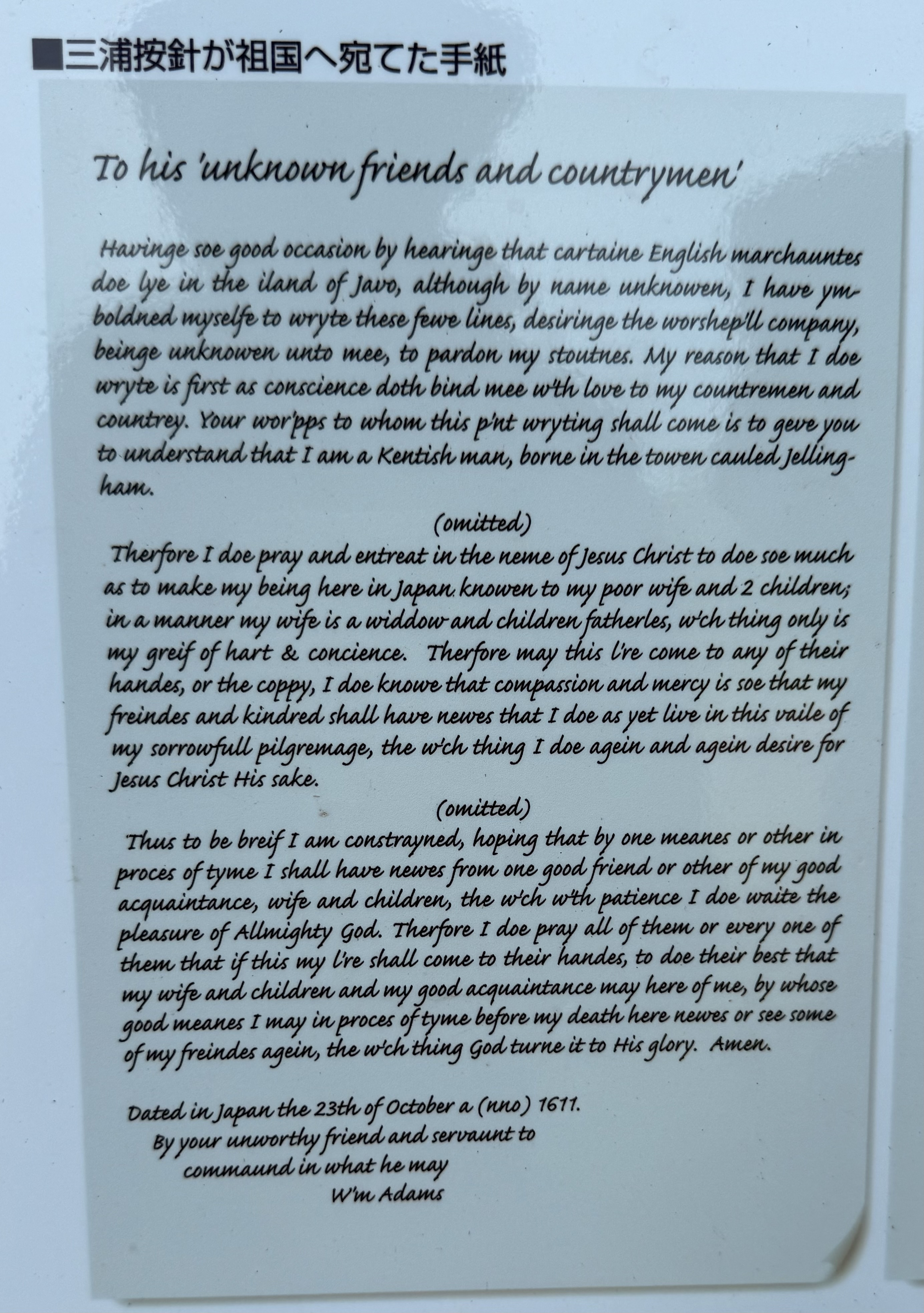
Text of a letter written by William Adams in 1611

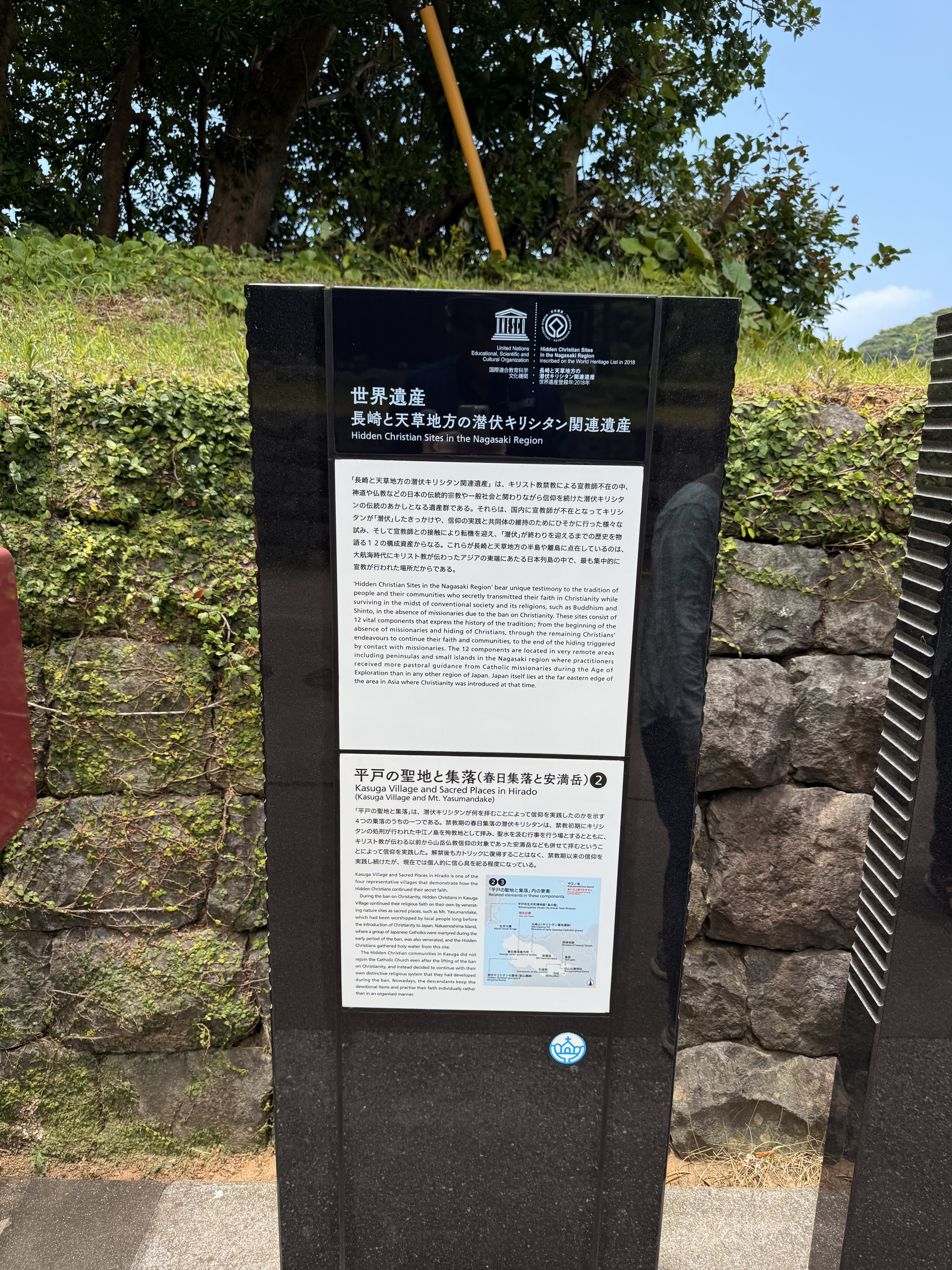
UNESCO World Heritage Site Sign: Hidden Christian Sites in the Nagasaki Region - Kasuga Village and Sacred Places in Hirado

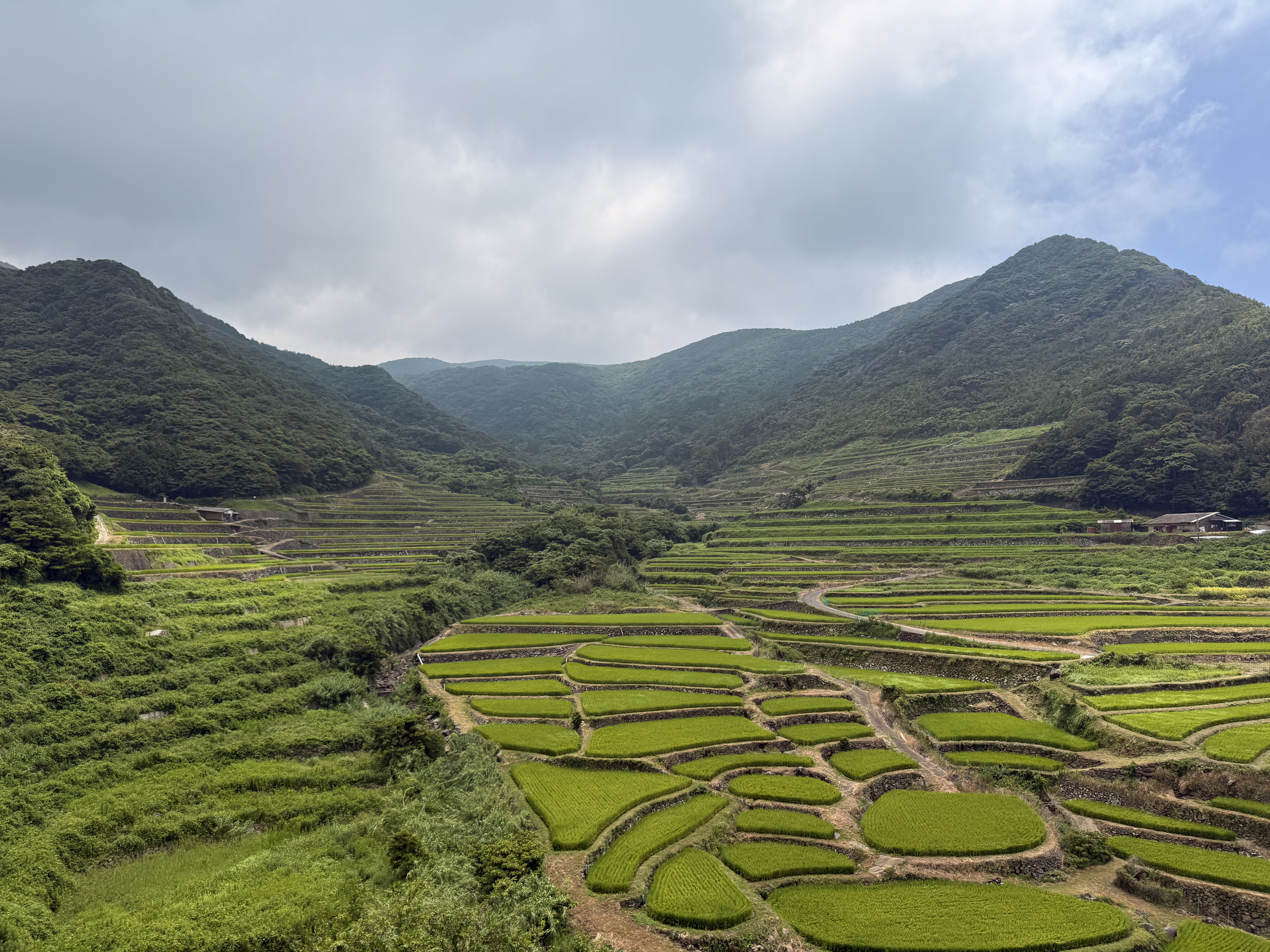
Rice terraces in Hirado in the area of the UNESCO World Heritage Site (Hidden Christian Sites in the Nagasaki Region - Kasuga Village and Sacred Places in Hirado)
