= Kakure Kirishitan =

Japanese Christian sect

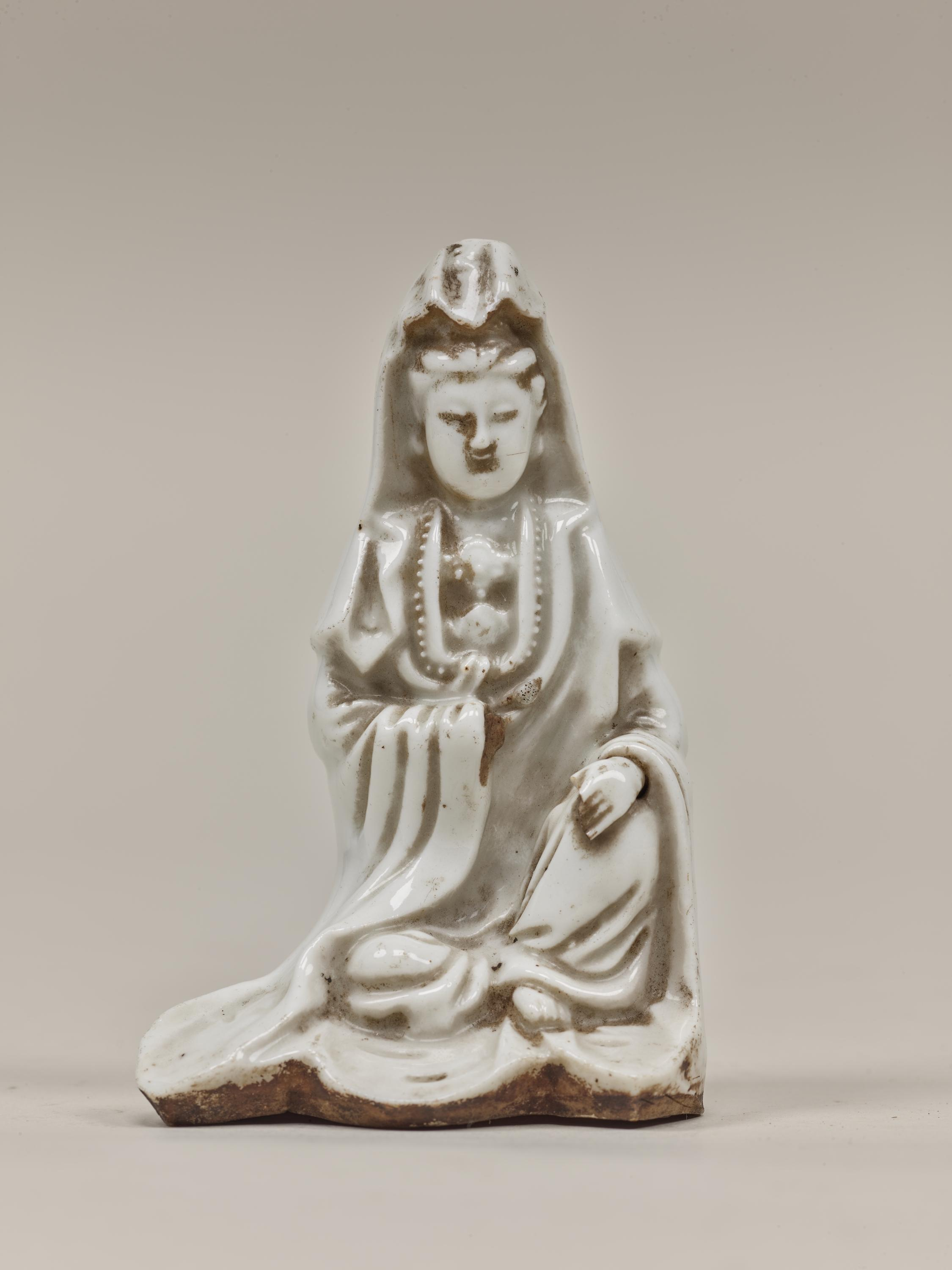
The Bodhisattva Kannon as the Virgin Mary, Tokyo National Museum.

Kakure Kirishitan (Japanese: 隠れキリシタン, lit. 'hidden Christians') is a modern term for a member of the Catholic Church in Japan who went underground at the start of the Edo period in the early 17th century (lifted in 1873) due to Christianity's repression by the Tokugawa shogunate (April 1638). The term is particularly used today for those who have refused to embrace modern Roman Catholic practices and still hold onto the traditions established during the times of persecution.

== History ==
Kakure Kirishitan are the Catholic communities in Japan which hid themselves during the ban and persecution of Christianity by Japan in the 1600s. During this time, many believers modified their religious practices to resemble Buddhist ones on a surface level, but which held hidden Christian meaning in reality. For instance, depictions of the Virgin Mary modeled on the Buddhist deity Kannon (Avalokiteśvara), goddess of mercy, became common among Kakure Kirishitan, and were known as "Maria Kannon". The prayers were adapted to sound like Buddhist chant, yet retained many untranslated words from Latin, Portuguese, and Spanish. The Bible and other parts of the liturgy were passed down orally, because printed works could be confiscated by authorities.

Kakure Kirishitan were recognized by Bernard Petitjean, a Catholic priest, when Ōura Church was built in Nagasaki in 1865. Approximately 30,000 secret Christians, some of whom had adopted these new ways of practicing Christianity, came out of hiding when religious freedom was re-established in 1873 after the Meiji Restoration. The Kakure Kirishitan became known as Mukashi Kirishitan (昔キリシタン), or 'ancient Christians', and emerged not only from traditional Christian areas in Kyushu, but also from other rural areas of Japan.

Some Kakure Kirishitan did not rejoin the Catholic Church, and became known as the Hanare Kirishitan (離れキリシタン, 'separated Christians'). Hanare Kirishitan are now primarily found in Urakami and on the Gotō Islands.

In the early 1990s, anthropologist Christal Whelan discovered some Hanare Kirishitan still living on the Gotō Islands where Kakure Kirishitan had once fled. There were only two surviving priests on the islands, both of whom were over 90, and they would not talk to each other. The few surviving laity had also reached old age, and some of them no longer had any priests from their lineage and prayed alone. Although these Hanare Kirishitan had a strong tradition of secrecy, they agreed to be filmed for Whelan's documentary Otaiya.

The Kakure Kirishitan still exist today, forming "what is arguably a separate faith, barely recognizable as the creed imported in the mid-1500s by Catholic missionaries". In 2025, it was reported that there were less than 100 Hidden Christians left on the island of Ikitsuki in Nagasaki, down from 10,000 in the 1940s.

== See also ==
- Haibutsu kishaku
- Shinbutsu bunri
- Shinbutsu kakuri
- Shimabara Rebellion
- Crypto-Christianity
- Hidden Christian Sites in the Nagasaki Region
- Kakure nenbutsu, a form of Jōdo Shinshū Buddhism secretly practiced on the Japanese island of Kyushu, during a period of religious persecution from 1555 to the Meiji Restoration.
- Inquisition
- Laramans
- Mozarabs
- Marrano/Anusim/Converso – comparable group of hidden Jews in Spain and Portugal
- Nagasaki Prefecture
