= List of islands of Japan by area =

Overview of Japanese islands by area

Japan has 14,125 islands, approximately 430 of which are inhabited. This list provides basic geographical data of the most prominent islands belonging to, or claimed by, Japan.

== List ==
| Name | Area (sq. km) | Highest elevation (metres) | Population | Prefecture(s) |
|---|---|---|---|---|
| Honshu | 225,800 | 3,776 | 104,000,000 | 34 prefectures |
| Kyushu | 36,782 | 1,791 | 12,970,479 | 7 prefectures |
| Hokkaido | 83,423 | 2,290 | 5,348,102 | Hokkaido |
| Shikoku | 18,297 | 1,982 | 3,796,687 | 4 prefectures |
| Okinawa | 1,206 | 503 | 1,301,462 | Okinawa |
| Awaji | 592 | 606 | 157,000 | Hyōgo |
| Shimoshima, Amakusa | 574 | 538 | 87,191 | Kumamoto |
| Amami Ōshima | 712 | 694 | 73,000 | Kagoshima |
| Miyako-jima | 158 | 115 | 55,914 | Okinawa |
| Sado | 854 | 1,172 | 55,474 | Niigata |
| Ishigaki | 222 | 526 | 47,000 | Okinawa |
| Tsushima | 709 | 649 | 39,716 | Nagasaki |
| Fukue | 326 | 461 | 38,481 | Nagasaki |
| Kamishima, Amakusa | 225 | 682 | 34,412 | Kumamoto |
| Tanegashima | 444 | 282 | 33,000 | Kagoshima |
| Hikoshima | 11 | 112 | 30,182 | Yamaguchi |
| Shōdoshima | 153 | 817 | 28,764 | Kagawa |
| Iki | 134 | 213 | 28,008 | Nagasaki |
| Mukaishima | 23 | 283 | 28,000 | Hiroshima |
| Innoshima | 35 | 390 | 27,465 | Hiroshima |
| Tokunoshima | 247 | 645 | 27,000 | Kagoshima |
| Etajima | 91 | 400 | 24,596 | Hiroshima |
| Ōmishima, Ehime | 65 | 437 | 23,398 | Ehime |
| Hirado | 163 | 535 | 21,355 | Nagasaki |
| Nakadori | 168 | 442 | 20,167 | Nagasaki |
| Suō-Ōshima | 128 | 691 | 19,739 | Yamaguchi |
| Kurahashi-jima | 69 | 491 | 19,565 | Hiroshima |
| Okinoerabujima | 93 | 246 | 15,000 | Kagoshima |
| Dōgojima | 242 | 607 | 14,849 | Shimane |
| Ōyano-jima | 30 | 229 | 14,729 | Kumamoto |
| Yakushima | 504 | 1,935 | 13,178 | Kagoshima |
| Nagashima, Kagoshima | 91 | 403 | 10,120 | Kagoshima |
| Kume Island | 59 | 310 | 10,000 | Okinawa |
| Hario | 33 | 174 | 9,767 | Nagasaki |
| Ikuchi-jima | 31 | 472 | 9,310 | Hiroshima |
| Hachijō-jima | 63 | 854 | 8,363 | Tokyo |
| Izu Ōshima | 91 | 764 | 8,179 | Tokyo |
| Kunashiri | 1,490 | 1,819 | 7,800 | Hokkaido |
| Hakata | 21 | 304 | 7,683 | Ehime |
| Kikaijima | 57 | 214 | 7,657 | Kagoshima |
| Etorofu | 3,174 | 1,634 | 7,500 | Hokkaido |
| Ikitsuki, Nagasaki | 17 | 286 | 7,014 | Nagasaki |
| Irabu-jima | 29 | 89 | 6,283 | Okinawa |
| Yoronjima | 21 | 98 | 6,000 | Kagoshima |
| Ōsakishimo-jima | 18 | 449 | 6,000 | Hiroshima |
| Oshima | 12 | 163 | 5,725 | Nagasaki |
| Rishiri | 183 | 1,721 | 5,102 | Hokkaido |
| Ie-jima | 23 | 172 | 4,198 | Okinawa |
| Goshoura | 13 | 442 | 3,615 | Kumamoto |
| Nishinoshima | 56 | 452 | 3,400 | Shimane |
| Okushiri | 142 | 584 | 3,343 | Hokkaido |
| Fukushima, Nagasaki | 17 | 141 | 3,202 | Nagasaki |
| Rebun | 80 | 490 | 3,194 | Hokkaido |
| Notojima | 47 | 197 | 3,187 | Ishikawa |
| Ōsakikamijima | 38 | 453 | 3,187 | Hiroshima |
| Naka-jima, Ehime | 21 | 293 | 2,938 | Ehime |
| Kamikoshiki-jima | 45 | 423 | 2,796 | Kagoshima |
| Shimokoshiki-jima | 66 | 604 | 2,780 | Kagoshima |
| Naru Island | 24 | 276 | 2,776 | Nagasaki |
| Nii-jima | 23 | 432 | 2,700 | Tokyo |
| Kamikamagari-jima | 19 | 457 | 2,658 | Hiroshima |
| Ukujima | 25 | 258 | 2,575 | Nagasaki |
| Takashima, Nagasaki | 16 | 117 | 2,487 | Nagasaki |
| Ojika | 12 | 111 | 2,433 | Nagasaki |
| Miyake-jima | 55 | 775 | 2,415 | Tokyo |
| Nakanoshima | 32 | 164 | 2,400 | Shimane |
| Iriomote | 289 | 470 | 2,347 | Okinawa |
| Minamidaitōjima | 31 | 75 | 2,107 | Okinawa |
| Shikotan | 247 | 412 | 2,100 | Hokkaido |
| Chichijima | 23 | 326 | 2,000 | Tokyo |
| Nagashima, Yamaguchi | 14 | 314 | 2,000 | Yamaguchi |
| Kōzu-shima | 18 | 571 | 1,952 | Tokyo |
| Ōshima (Ehime) | 42 | 382 | 1,800 | Ehime |
| Itsukushima | 30 | 535 | 1,800 | Hiroshima |
| Yonaguni | 29 | 231 | 1,745 | Okinawa |
| Wakamatsu | 31 | 339 | 1,661 | Nagasaki |
| Kakeromajima | 77 | 314 | 1,600 | Kagoshima |
| Izena | 15 | 120 | 1,518 | Okinawa |
| Azuchi-Ōshima | 15 | 177 | 1,269 | Nagasaki |
| Iheya-jima | 21 | 98 | 1,214 | Okinawa |
| Ōmi-jima | 15 | 320 | 1,200 | Yamaguchi |
| Teshima | 15 | 340 | 1,200 | Kagawa |
| Tarama-jima | 20 | 34 | 1,185 | Okinawa |
| Shishi-jima | 17 | 393 | 1,050 | Kagoshima |
| Hiroshima, Kagawa | 12 | 453 | 800 | Kagawa |
| Kasado-jima | 12 | 256 | 800 | Yamaguchi |
| Tokashiki | 15 | 227 | 750 | Okinawa |
| Kitadaitōjima | 12 | 74 | 660 | Okinawa |
| Chiburijima | 14 | 325 | 650 | Shimane |
| Heigun | 17 | 468 | 591 | Yamaguchi |
| Hateruma | 13 | 60 | 490 | Okinawa |
| Hahajima | 20 | 462 | 450 | Tokyo |
| Hisaka | 37 | 357 | 395 | Nagasaki |
| Mikura-jima | 20 | 851 | 351 | Tokyo |
| Okinoshima | 10 | 404 | 283 | Kōchi |
| Awashima, Niigata | 10 | 266 | 265 | Niigata |
| Kuroshima | 10 | 15 | 220 | Okinawa |
| Uke | 13 | 400 | 200 | Kagoshima |
| Kuroshima | 15 | 622 | 199 | Kagoshima |
| Nakanoshima | 34 | 979 | 167 | Kagoshima |
| Kuchinoerabu-jima | 38 | 657 | 147 | Kagoshima |
| Kuchinoshima | 13 | 629 | 140 | Kagoshima |
| Iōjima | 12 | 704 | 121 | Kagoshima |
| Suwanosejima | 28 | 796 | 48 | Kagoshima |
| Kakuijima | 10 | 245 | 12 | Okayama |
| Kinkasan | 10 | 445 | 6 | Miyagi |
| Shibotsu | 58 | 45 | 0 | Hokkaido |
| Iwo Jima | 21 | 161 | 0 | Tokyo |
| Suishō-tō | 12 | 18 | 0 | Hokkaido |
| Taraku | 11 | 16 | 0 | Hokkaido |
| Yuri | 10 | 44 | 0 | Hokkaido |
| Oshima (Hokkaido) | 10 | 732 | 0 | Hokkaido |
| Takeshima | 0.19 | 169 | 0 | Shimane |

claimed but not controlled.

== See also ==
- Geography of Japan
- Japanese archipelago
- List of islands of Japan
- Lists of islands
- Names of Japan

== Notes ==
- This article used material from Japanese Wikipedia page 日本の島の一覧, accessed 28 July 2017
