= Naru Island (Japan) =

One of the Gotō Islands

Native name: 奈留島 "Narushima"
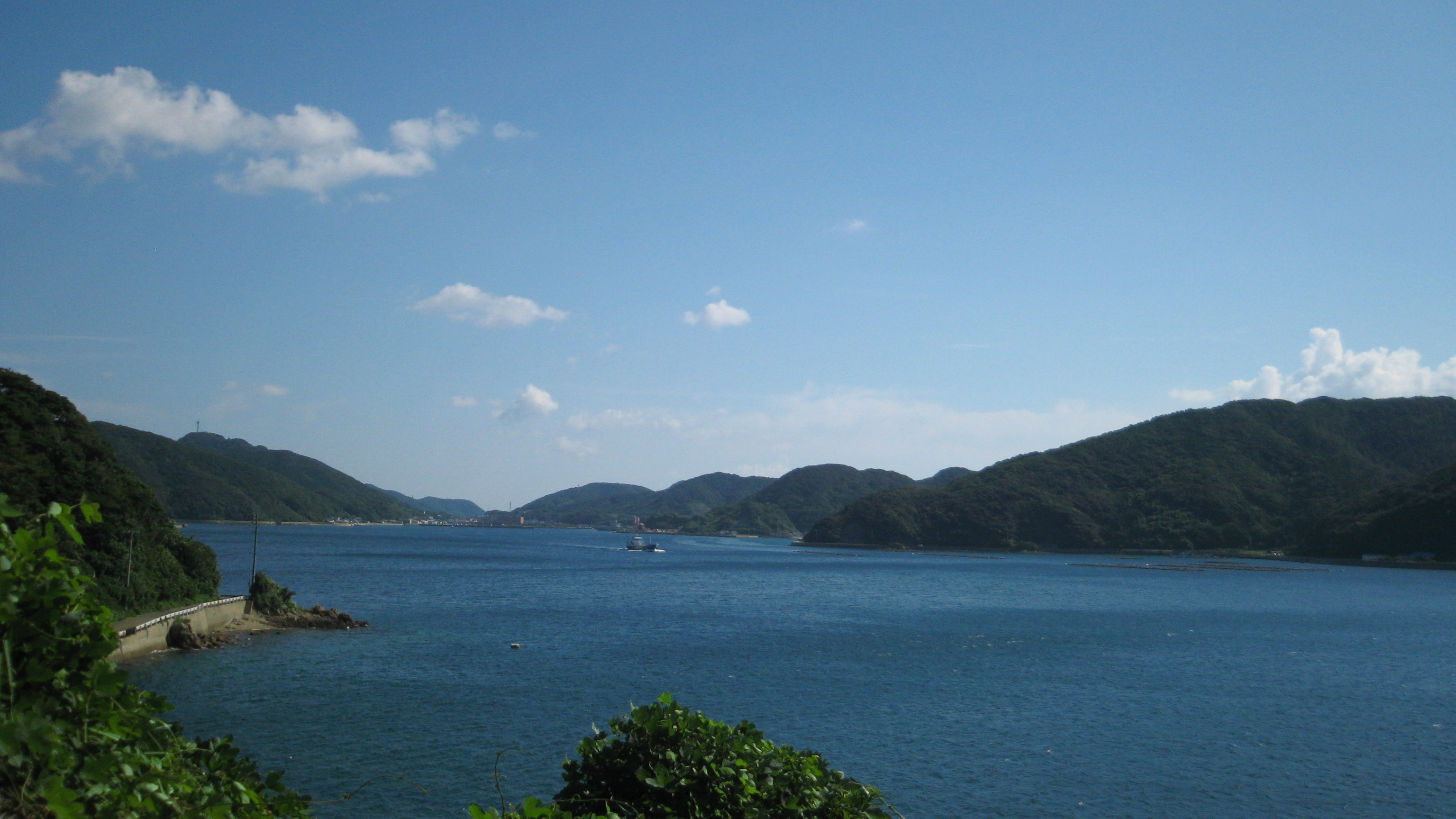
- View from the town of Naru

- Location within Nagasaki Prefecture

Geography
- Coordinates: 32°50′15″N 128°56′5″E
- Archipelago: Gotō Islands
- Area: 23.82 km^{2} (9.20 sq mi)
- Highest elevation: 276 m (906 ft)

Administration
- Japan

Demographics
- Population: 2776

Naru Island (奈留島, Naru-shima) is one of the Gotō Islands in Japan. It is part of the city of Gotō in Nagasaki Prefecture.

The island is home to Egami Church, the Shirotake Observatory, and a ferry port servicing travel to and from Nagasaki.

Naru Island's history has been defined by its fishery, as well as its role in providing sanctuary for the Hidden Christians fleeing Tokugawa persecution. The island has several churches, built by missionaries.

== History ==
Naru Island was a port of call for Japanese vessels on missions to China during the Ming dynasty, from the 15th century to the latter half of the 16th century. It was the custom of the chief priest of Naru Shrine to pray for the vice-envoy's safe voyage at sea. From the 13th century, the island was ruled by the Naru clan, but eventually became part of the Uku clan's dominion around the 15th century when the Uku clan took control of the Gotō Islands.

Christianity was introduced to the Gotō Islands, including Naru, in 1566, as proclaimed by Luis de Almeida, but worshipping was banned in 1612. de Almeida's mission was on Fukue Island, but the names of Japanese Catholics are preserved from the early 17th century, suggesting that his mission extended north from Fukue to Naru and Hisaka, located between the two. The location Natsui was named among a collection of signatures of Japanese Catholics, identified as the present-day Natsui village on Naru.

According to the Naru Town History Editorial Board, Hidden Christians began migrating to Naru from mainland Nagasaki, first to the uninhabited island of Kazura (カズラ島) between Wakamatsu Island and Nakadōri Island, and then to Naru, where they settled in the villages of Nagahae, Tsubakihara, and Nankoshi. In 1797, three Hidden Christians came to Naru from the villages of Mie and Sotome on the Nishisonogi Peninsula as missionaries in secret, followed by many others. The places settled by Hidden Christians were often remote areas, isolated from the extent Buddhist villages. After the ban on Christianity in Japan was lifted, Hidden Christians who had settled in the area now known as Egami built a church in 1906 that was eventually renovated and became Egami Church, in part of an effort to reconnect Hidden Christians with mainstream Catholicism.

== Development ==
The Ministry of the Environment has conducted pilot projects in Nagasaki prefecture to test the feasible of marine renewable energy since 2010. Naru Strait, between Naru and Wakamatsu, was identified as a potential site for tidal energy projects. Authorities are in the process of building a test center, similar to the European Marine Energy Centre located in Scotland.

Although fishing is the main traditional industry on Naru, the fishery industry is rapidly declining due to an aging population and a lack of young people joining the industry.

== Ecology ==
Aetobatus narutobiei, the Naru eagle ray, was named after Naru Island, where it was first found in Japan.
