= Daien-ji (Gotō) =

Buddhist temple in Gotō, Nagasaki, Japan

Daien-ji 大円寺
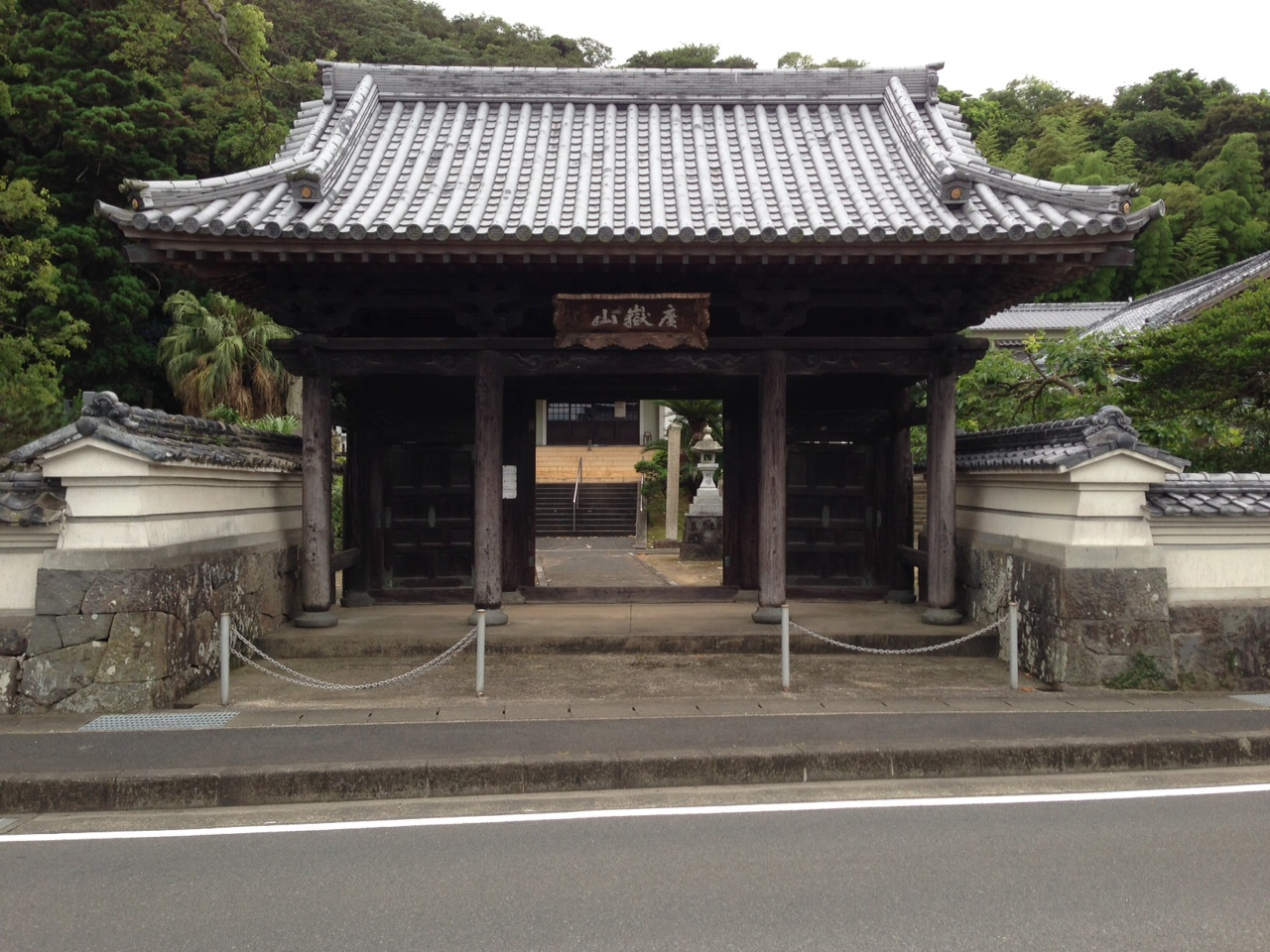
- Main gate

Religion
- Affiliation: Sōtō Zen

Location
- Location: 1306 Mionocho, Gotō, Nagasaki
- Country: Japan
- Interactive map of Daien-ji 大円寺
- Coordinates: 32°41′20.5″N 128°49′59.0″E

Daien-ji (大円寺) is a Buddhist temple in Gotō, Nagasaki, affiliated with the Sōtō school of Zen Buddhism.

The temple's sangō is Kōgōzan (広巌山). Its honzon is Śākyamuni Buddha.

== History ==
According to tradition, this temple was founded in the middle of the Daiei era (1521–1528) of the Sengoku period by military commander Uku Morisada. It is said that he designated the current name to a hermitage that was built on this land.

The temple later became the bodai-ji of the Gotō clan after Morisada gained lordship over the Fukue Domain of Hizen Province. He also took on the role of the monks' "registrar" (録司, rokushi), resulting in the unification of the Sōtō school in the Gotō Islands.

== Cultural Property ==
- Gotō Family Tomb
