= Danjo Islands =

Japanese island group

Native name: 男女群島 Danjo-guntō
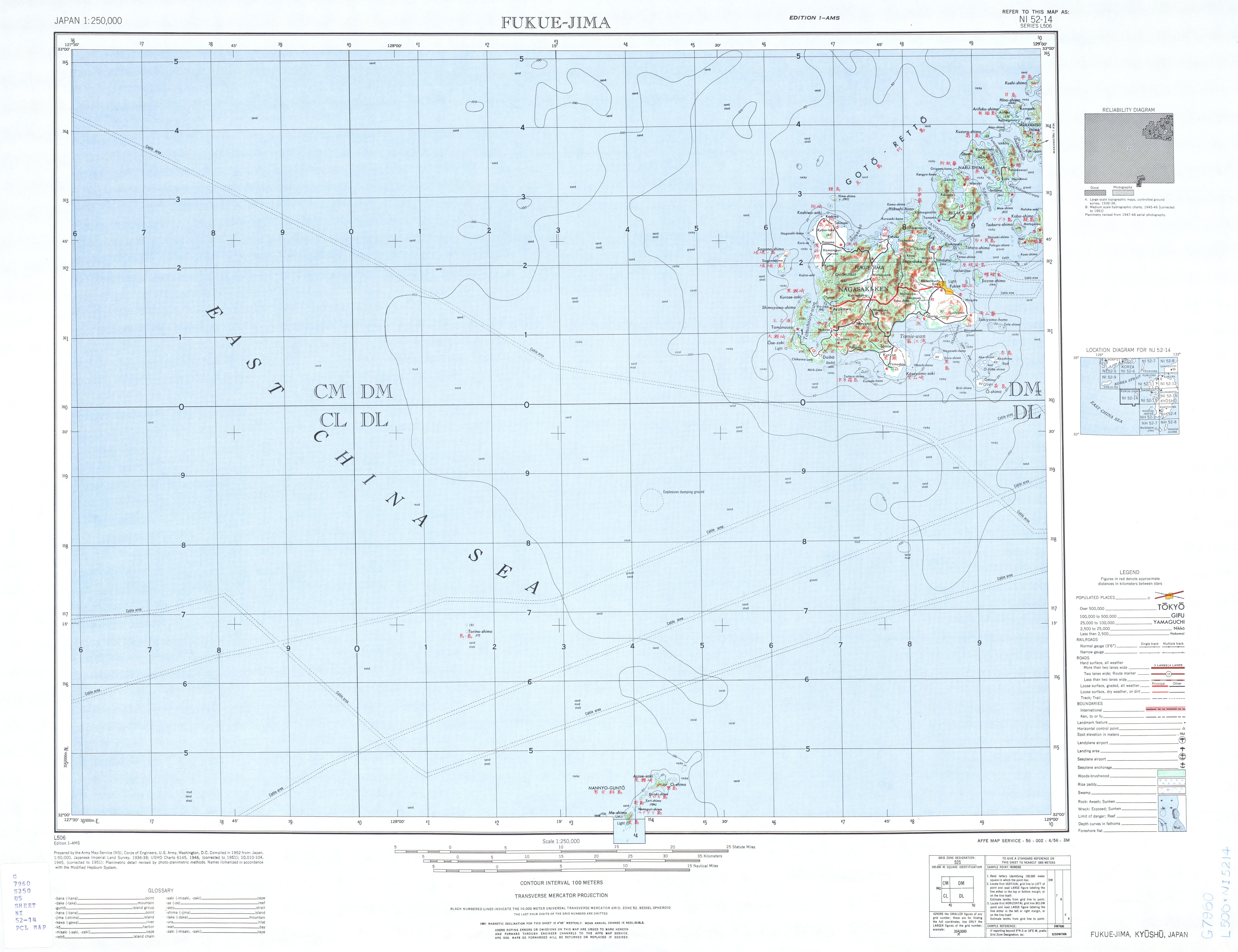
- Danjo Islands (at the bottom, marked NANNYO-GUNTŌ) in the East China Sea, with the Gotō Islands to the Northeast (USAMS 1952)
- Interactive map of Danjo Islands

Geography
- Coordinates: 32°01′26″N 128°23′07″E
- Adjacent to: East China Sea
- Major islands: 5 (uninhabited)
- Area: 4.7 km^{2} (1.8 sq mi)
- Highest elevation: 281 m (922 ft)

Administration
- Japan
- Prefectures: Nagasaki Prefecture
- Municipality: Gotō City

The Danjo Islands (男女群島, Danjo-guntō; literally: "male and female archipelago") are a small uninhabited Japanese island group in the East China Sea situated approximately 70 kilometres (43 mi) south-southwest of the Gotō Islands and administratively part of the city of Gotō, Nagasaki Prefecture. The five main islands of O-shima (男島) Kuroki-jima (クロキ島), Yori-shima (寄島), Hanaguri-jima (ハナグリ島), and Me-shima (女島) together stretch some 10 kilometres (6.2 mi) from north to south and cover an area of 4.7 square kilometres (1.8 sq mi). The islands, their flora, and their fauna are protected as a Natural Monument, Biotic Community Protection Forest, Special Wildlife Protection Area, and Important Bird Area. Birds found on the islands include the Japanese murrelet, streaked shearwater, brown booby, Ryukyu robin, Japanese wood pigeon, and Pleske's grasshopper warbler.

== Maps and images ==
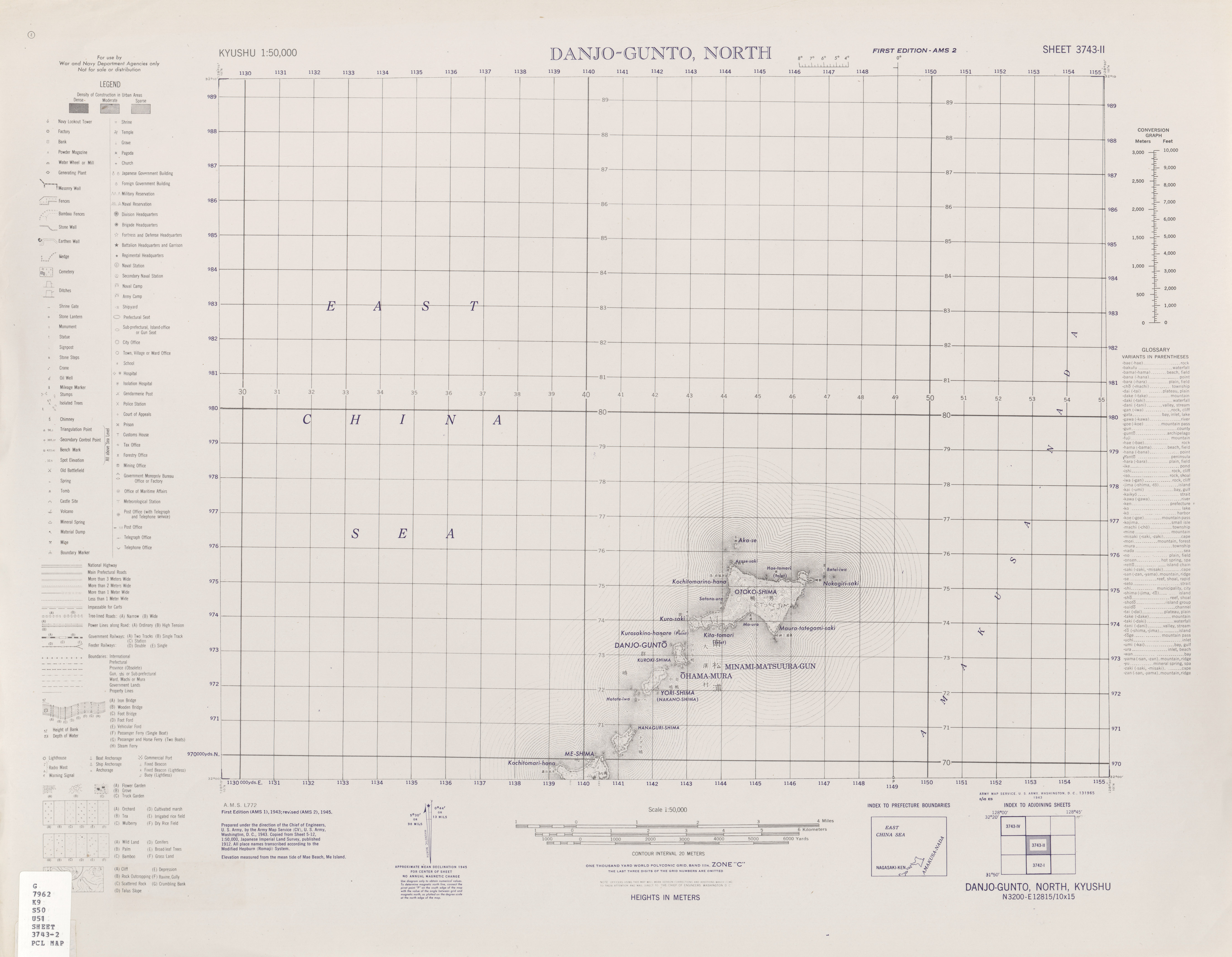
Danjo Islands (North)
(USAMS 1945)

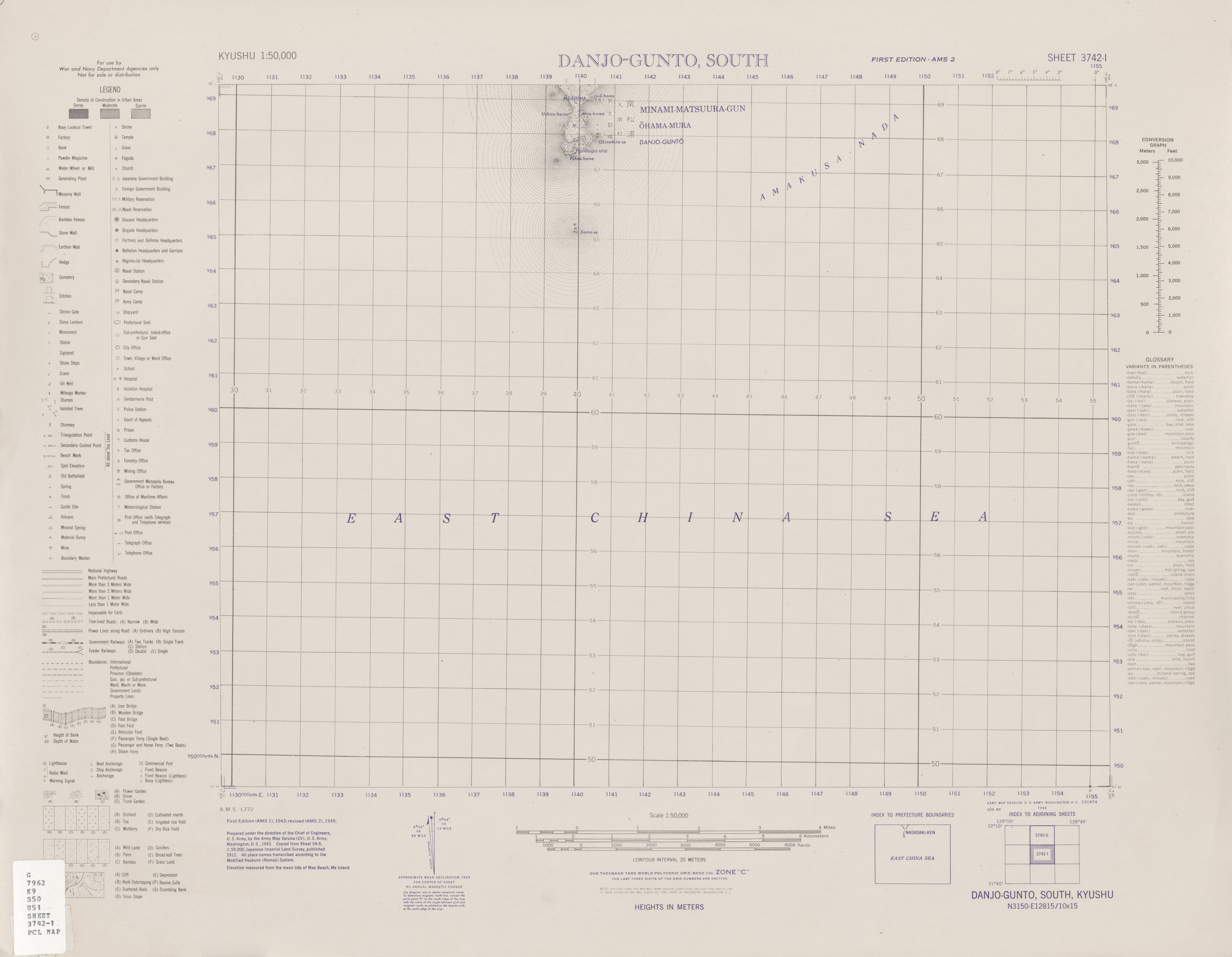
Danjo Islands (South)
(USAMS 1945)

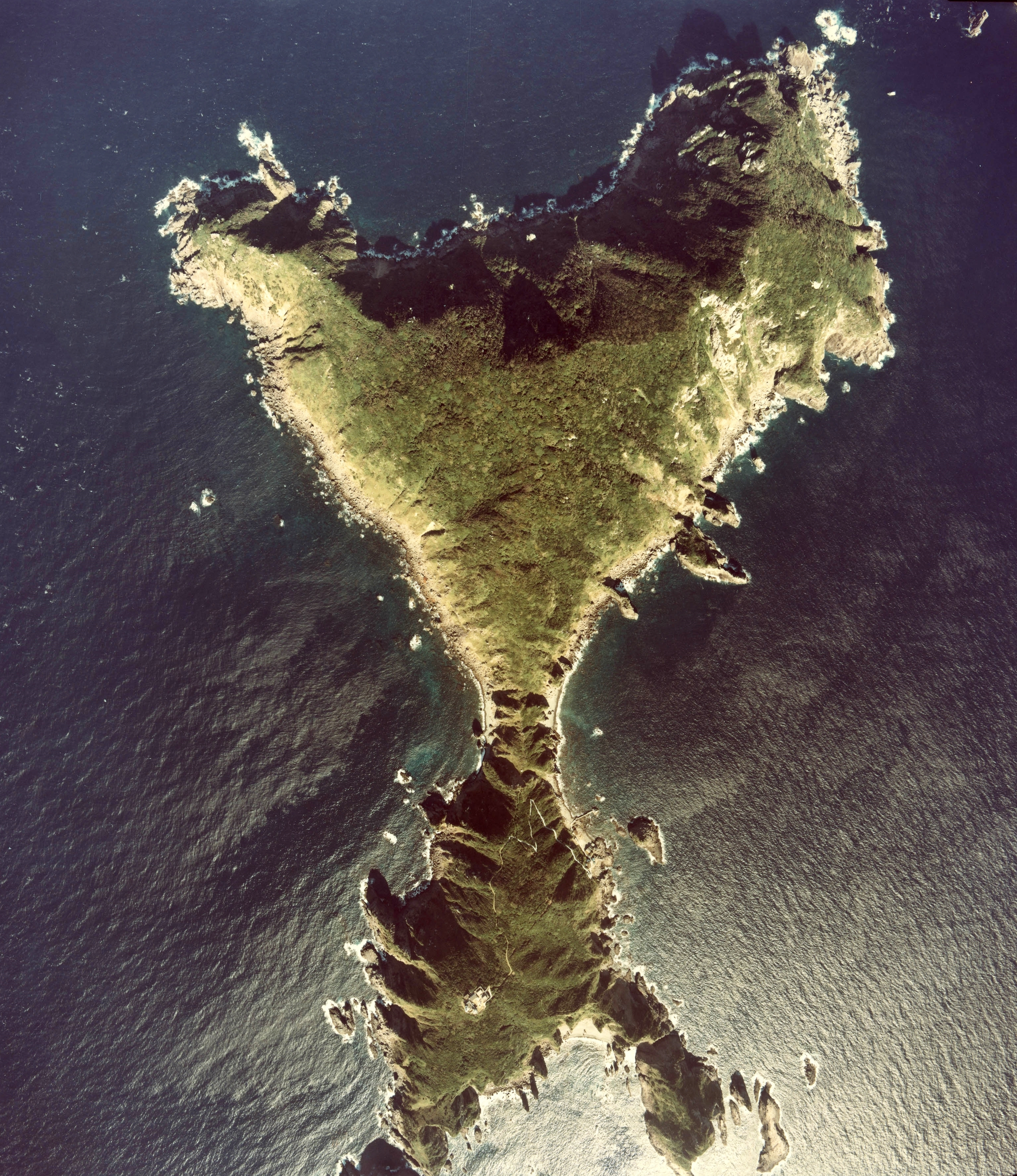
Me-shima
(MLIT 1978)

== See also ==
- Fukue Island
- Jeju Island
