= Egami Church =

Church in Nagasaki, Japan

- 江上天主堂
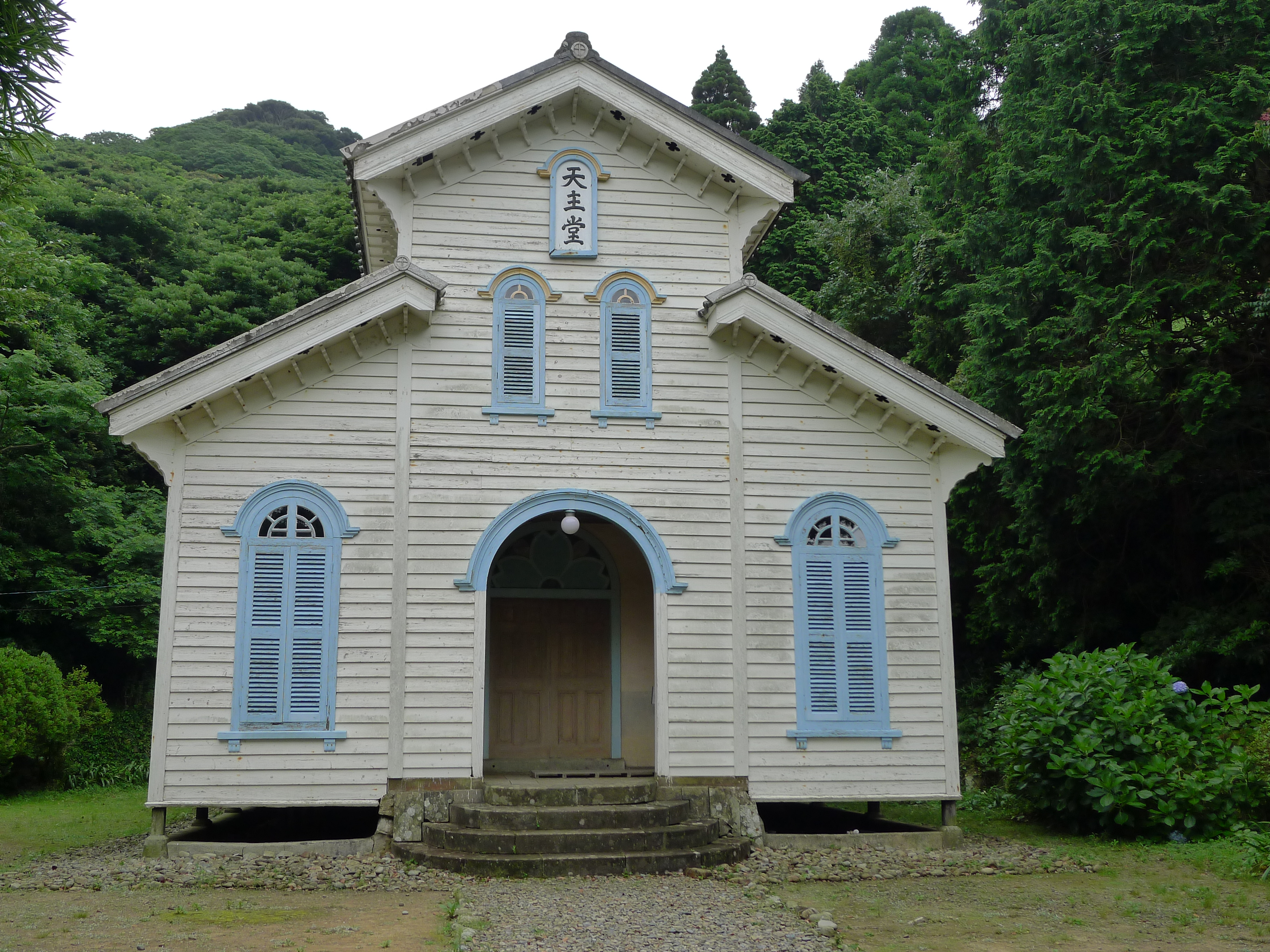
- The church's exterior in July 2015

- Location of the church Egami Church (Nagasaki Prefecture)
- 32.855255667662654°N 128.90407736448208°E
- Location: Gotō, Nagasaki
- Country: Japan
- Denomination: Roman Catholic
- Website: kyoukaigun.jp/en/visit/egami.php

Architecture
- Architect: Yosuke Tetsuksawa
- Completed: 1918

Administration
- Archdiocese: Archdiocese of Nagasaki

UNESCO World Heritage Site
- Part of: Hidden Christian Sites in the Nagasaki Region
- Criteria: Cultural: iii
- Reference: 1495-011
- Inscription: 2018 (42nd Session)

Egami Church (江上天主堂, Egami Tenshudō) is a Catholic church in Gotō, Nagasaki, Japan.

The church was first constructed in 1918 after the ban on Christianity was lifted. It is often considered one of the finest wooden churches in Japan. It was inscribed as a World Heritage Site in 2018 along with Egami Village as part of the "Hidden Christian Sites in the Nagasaki Region".

== History ==
Christianity first entered Naru Island, the location of Egami Church, when four Hidden Christian families emigrated from Nishisonogi to escape persecution. These families settled near the coast, away from the preexisting villages on the island, allowing them to practice their faith in secret. After the ban of Christianity was lifted, the locals constructed a simple church out of wood in 1906. Due to funding from Kibinago fishing the church was renovated into its current state in 1919, with the help of architect, Yosuke Tetsukawa. The church was painted into its current color scheme of white and pastel blue in 2001. Since 2016, it has undergone small scale repair work to maintain its preserved state. In 2015, the church received 790 visitors per month. There is currently only one Christian family remaining in Egami Village though the church still functions as a gathering place for the local community on Naru Island.

In 2008 Egami Church was designated as an Important Cultural Property and in 2012 the church's precincts were inscribed as an Important Cultural Property. In 2018 the church along with the surrounding village of Egami were inscribed as part of the World Heritage Site, "Hidden Christian Sites in the Nagasaki Region". The church was inscribed due to being "representative of the series of churches built by the former Hidden Christians".

== Architecture ==
The church's primary architect was Yosuke Tetsukawa, who was nicknamed "the father of church architecture" due to the many churches he designed around Japan. Egami Church was constructed in a way so that it could adapt to the weather and environment on Naru Island. It is surrounded by a grove of trees that protected the church from storm damage and features white walls and blue window panes. It is considered one of the finest wooden churches in Japan, but its exterior has undergone visible aging in recent years. The church's interior features a rib vault ceiling and it has three aisles, its windows have a cherry blossom design which were drawn by hand. The church's nave walls feature an arcade design along with triforium.
