= Gotō Morinori =

Gotō Morinori 五島 盛徳

13th Lord of Fukue
- In office 1858–1871
- Preceded by: Gotō Moriakira
- Succeeded by: none

Personal details
- Born: July 15, 1840 Fukue, Hizen Province, Japan
- Died: November 11, 1875 (aged 35) Japan

Gotō Morinori (五島 盛徳; July 15, 1840 – November 11, 1875) was the 11th and final daimyō of Fukue Domain in Hizen Province, Kyūshū, Japan (modern-day Nagasaki Prefecture). He was the 31st hereditary head of the Gotō clan. His courtesy titles were Ōmi-no-kami, and later Hida-no-kami, and he held lower 5th court rank.

== Biography ==
Morinori was the third son of the tenth daimyō of Fukue Domain, Gotō Moriakira. However, as both of his elder brothers died at early ages, he was selected as heir, and became eleventh daimyō on the retirement of his father on January 21, 1858.

He was of weak constitution and his retired father continued to play an active role in his administration. In 1863, he completed the reconstruction of the family seat at Ishida Castle, the last Japanese castle to be constructed under the Tokugawa Bakufu. He was an early supporter of the Sonnō jōi movement, and was ordered to Kyoto in October 1867 to pledge his loyalty to Emperor Meiji. He arrived in Kyoto in 1868, and the new Meiji government ordered him to strengthen the maritime defenses of his island domain against possible incursions by foreign ships. To defray the costs of this program, the new government abolished the subsidiary fief of Tomie, and added its 3000 koku to his revenues. The people of Tomie were highly opposed to the union with Fukue, and it was not until July 1869 that he was able to take possession of the new territories. By this time, the position of daimyō had already been abolished, and his official title was that of domain governor.

On July 15, 1871, Fukue domain itself was abolished with the abolition of the han system, and became part of the new Nagasaki Prefecture. Morinori relocated to Tokyo. He died in 1875, predeceasing his father, and his grave is at the temple of Kichijo-ji. His descendants were later given the peerage title of shishaku (viscount) under the kazoku peerage system.

Preceded by Gotō Moriakira	13th Lord of Fukue; 1858–1871	Succeeded by none
