= Goto City Floating Offshore Wind Farm =

Offshore wind farm off the Goto Islands, Japan

- Official name: Goto City Offshore Floating Wind Power Project
- Country: Japan
- Location: Sea of Japan
- Coordinates: 32°39′N 128°58′E
- Status: Operational
- Construction began: June 2022
- Commission date: January 2026
- Owners: TODA Corporation; INPEX; Japan Renewable Energy Corporation (ENEOS Corporation); Osaka Gas; Kansai Electric Power Company; Chubu Electric Power
- Operator: Goto Floating Wind Farm LLC

Wind farm
- Type: Offshore
- Max. water depth: 130 m
- Distance from shore: 5 km
- Hub height: 60 m
- Rotor diameter: 80 m

Power generation
- Nameplate capacity: 16.8 MW

External links
- Website: Goto City Offshore Wind Power Project

The Gotō City Floating Offshore Wind Farm is an offshore wind farm off Gotō, Gotō Islands, Nagasaki Prefecture, Japan. As of October 2026, it is, at 16.8MW, the largest floating offshore wind farm in Japan.

The project was originally developed by TODA Corporation of Japan, in conjunction with joint venture partners INPEX, Japan Renewable Energy Corporation (a subsidiary of ENEOS Corporation), Osaka Gas, Kansai Electric Power Company and Chubu Electric Power.

The project is unique in Japan, in that it uses downwind wind turbines, where the wind passes over the nacelle before reaching the blades. This increases wind capture and simplifies the mechanical complexity by negating the need for a yaw motor system, as the turbines automatically weathervane align toward the wind. Also, it was the last wind farm to use wind turbines manufactured by Hitachi Heavy Industries (which now resells turbines made by Enercon). It utilises eight HTW2.1-80A turbines, each rated at 2.1 MW.

The project is also relatively rare in that, like the Hywind Tampen floating wind farm, it utilises SPAR (Single Point Anchor Reservoir) foundations, derived from oil and gas floating SPAR platforms. The top section of the SPARs are steel, with the bottom section made from rings of concrete.

Gotō City Floating Offshore Wind Farm in its entirety

Closeup of SPAR foundation and wind turbine at Gotō City floating wind farm
