= Kankoro mochi =

Confection from Nagasaki Prefecture

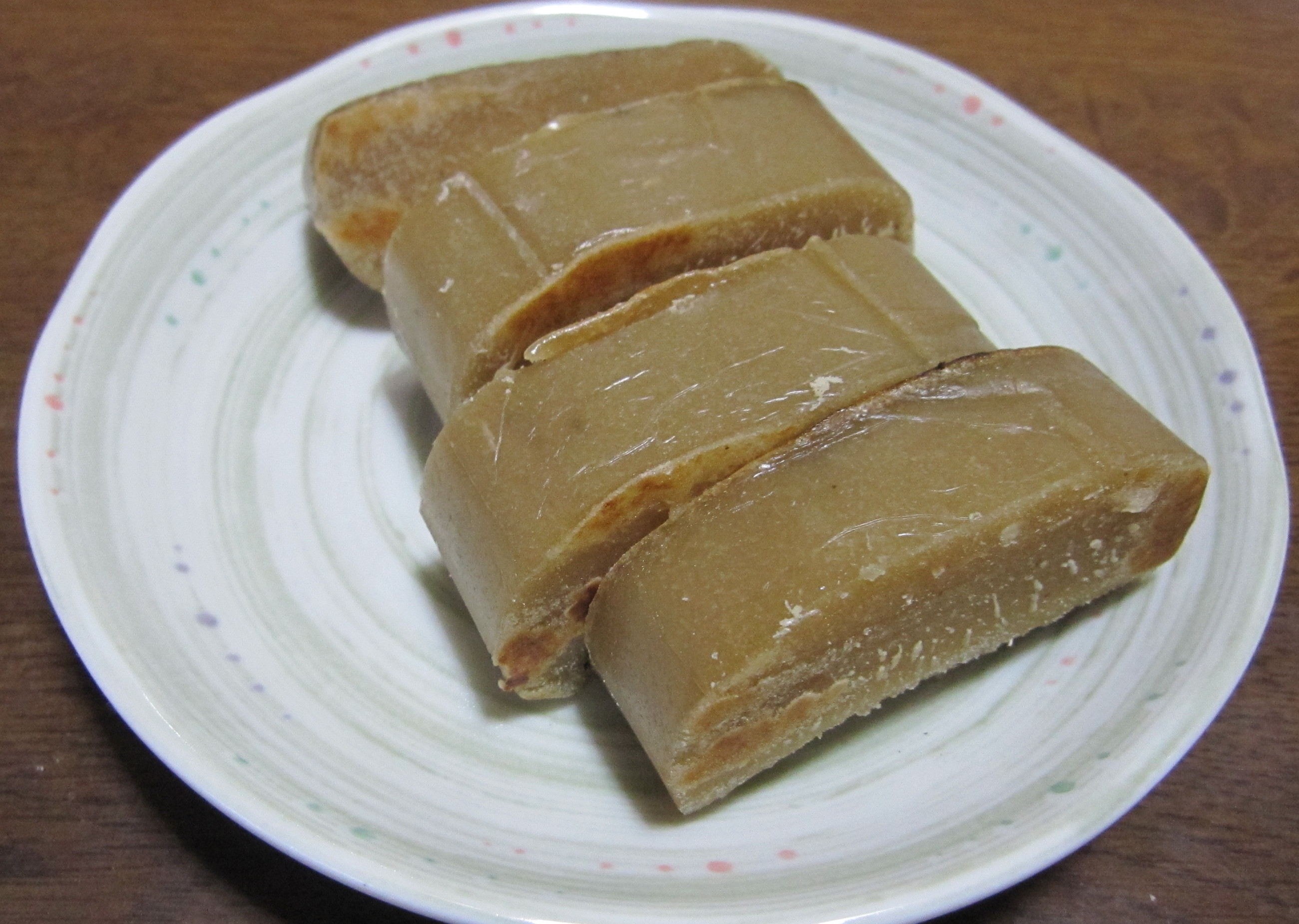
Kankoro mochi

Kankoro mochi (かんころもち) is a type of mochi commonly eaten in Kyushu and Okinawa, Japan. It is made by mixing partially boiled sweet potatoes into mochi.

== Origin ==
"Kankoro", in Gotō's regional dialect, refers to thinly sliced, sun-dried sweet potato. Originally prepared as a non-perishable food for winter in the Gotō region, it has become a specialty, or tokusanhin, of Nagasaki Prefecture and is manufactured and sold throughout the prefecture.

Sweet potatoes can be grown on the Gotō Islands despite its lack of flat ground and abundance of barren slopes. Additionally, there is little difference between a good and bad harvest, and they are resistant to damage from typhoons, eliminating the risk of famine. These qualities have made sweet potatoes valued as a vital agriculture product supporting the economy of the Gotō Islands. Although it is unknown when sweet potatoes came to be cultivated on the Gotō Islands, it had become a crop grown by commoners by the Kanbun era (1661–1672), and in 1833, the Fukue Domain began to promote sweet potato cultivation in a dramatic shift from existing regulations. Sweet potatoes began to spread across the islands at the beginning of the Meiji era in the late 1860s, and by the Taishō era (1912–1926), it was the Gotō Islands' most abundant agricultural product.

Cultivation of sweet potatoes in Gotō would later slowly decline as their demand as an ingredient in shōchū and starch waned. However, many households still make kankoro mochi for the Japanese New Year to send to children and relatives who have left the islands.

== Preparation ==
1. Sweet potatoes are left in the sun for half a month to drain some of their moisture. The skin is peeled and the potatoes are cut into thin, round slices. After being boiled, the slices are dried in the sun. The finished product (kankoro) is then stored.
2. Glutinous rice is washed, steeped in water for half a month, and then steamed.
3. The kankoro is washed in a bucket or other container with hot water. A lid is placed on the container, and after allowing the kankoro to soak for a short time, it is then steamed.
4. The steamed kankoro is placed into a mortar and mashed with a mochi hammer. The steamed glutinous rice is added and then thoroughly mashed. When factory made, a mochi pounding machine or mixer is used.
5. The resulting mixture is transferred to a table and formed into semi-cylinders.

== Characteristics ==
- Color ranges from green to greenish brown. Very sweet and stays soft even at lower temperatures.
- When made using traditional methods, it cannot be consumed without being fried unless mixed with anko and is also less sweet.
- Varieties include mochi mixed with yomogi or roasted sesame seeds.
- Unlike regular mochi, the glutinous rice in kankoro mochi, which keeps it together, will melt when cooked for even a short amount of time. Thus, care is needed when preparing it.
- Dissolves when simmered.
