= Fukue, Nagasaki =

Dissolved municipality in Nagasaki prefecture, Japan

Coordinates: 32.688°N 128.842°E

Fukue (福江市, Fukue-shi) was a city located in the Gotō Islands of Nagasaki Prefecture, Japan. It was the largest city on the Gotō Islands. The city was founded on April 1, 1954.

As of 2003, the city had an estimated population of 26,886 and the density of 170.01 persons per km^{2}. The total area was 158.14 km^{2}.

On August 1, 2004, Fukue, along with the towns of Kishiku, Miiraku, Naru, Tamanoura and Tomie (all from Minamimatsuura District), was merged to create the city of Gotō.

Gotō-Fukue Airport is located in former Fukue City.
