= Ishida Castle =

Castle ruins in Nagasaki, Japan

- 石田城
- Gotō, Nagasaki prefecture, Japan
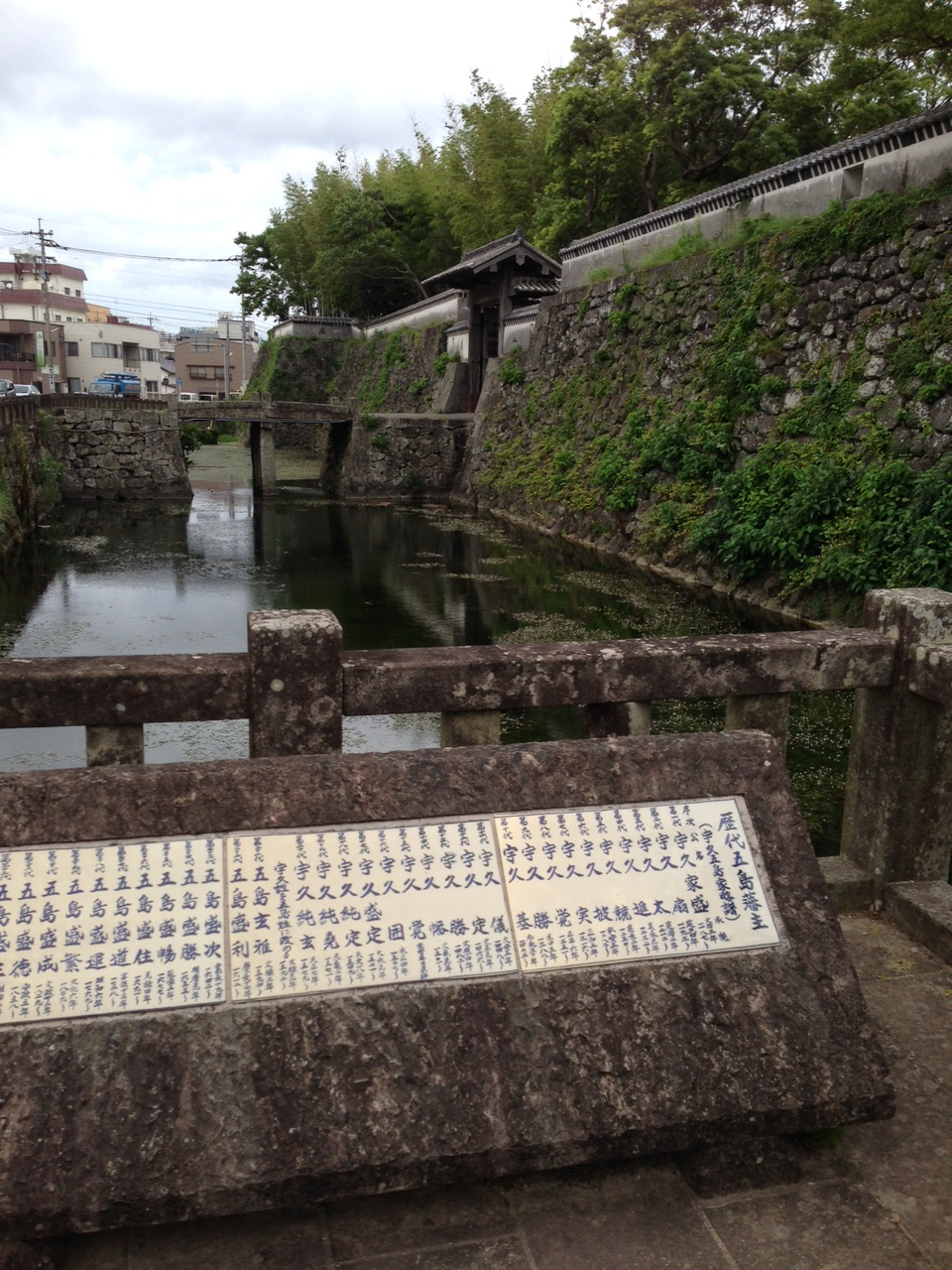
- Stone wall and Water moat of Ishida castle

Site information
- Type: Umijiro-style castle
- Owner: Gotō clan
- Condition: Ruins

Location
- Coordinates: 32.6933°N 128.8449°E

Site history
- Built: 1863
- Built by: Gotō Moriakira, Gotō Morinori
- Demolished: 1872

Garrison information
- Past commanders: Gotō Moriakira

Ishida Castle (石田城, Ishida-jō) is the remains of a castle structure in Gotō, Nagasaki prefecture. Also well known as "Fukue castle ". Construction started in 1849 and were completed in 1863.

The former Goto clan's residence and garden is in the ninomaru compound and its designated as a “National designation place of scenic beauty”. Goto Tourism and Historical Materials Museum is on site.

The castle was listed as one of the Continued 100 Fine Castles of Japan in 2017.

== Literature ==
- De Lange, William (2021). An Encyclopedia of Japanese Castles. Groningen: Toyo Press. pp. 600 pages. ISBN 978-9492722300.
