= Gotō Islands =

Japanese islands off the west coast of Kyushu

Native name: 五島列島
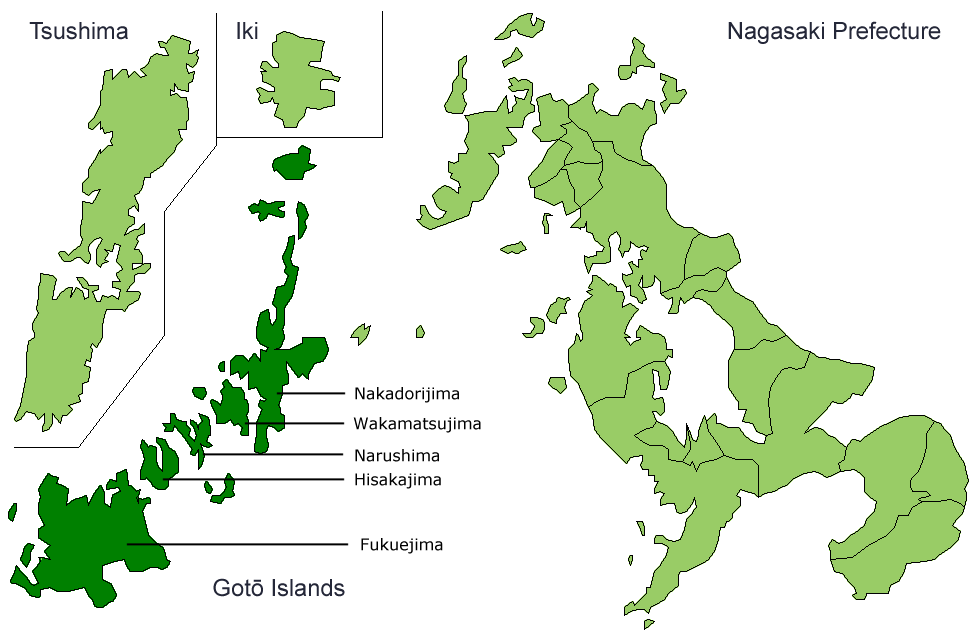
- Goto Islands in relation to Nagasaki Prefecture

Geography
- Location: Sea of Japan
- Coordinates: 32.90°N 129.05°E
- Total islands: 140
- Major islands: Fukue Island, Hisaka Island, Naru Island, Wakamatsu Island, Nakadōri Island

Administration
- Japan
- Prefecture: Nagasaki

Demographics
- Population: 76,311 (2005)

Additional information
- Time zone: Japan Standard Time (UTC+9)

The Gotō Islands (五島列島, Gotō-rettō; literally: "five-island archipelago") are Japanese islands in the Sea of Japan. They are part of Nagasaki Prefecture.

== Geography ==
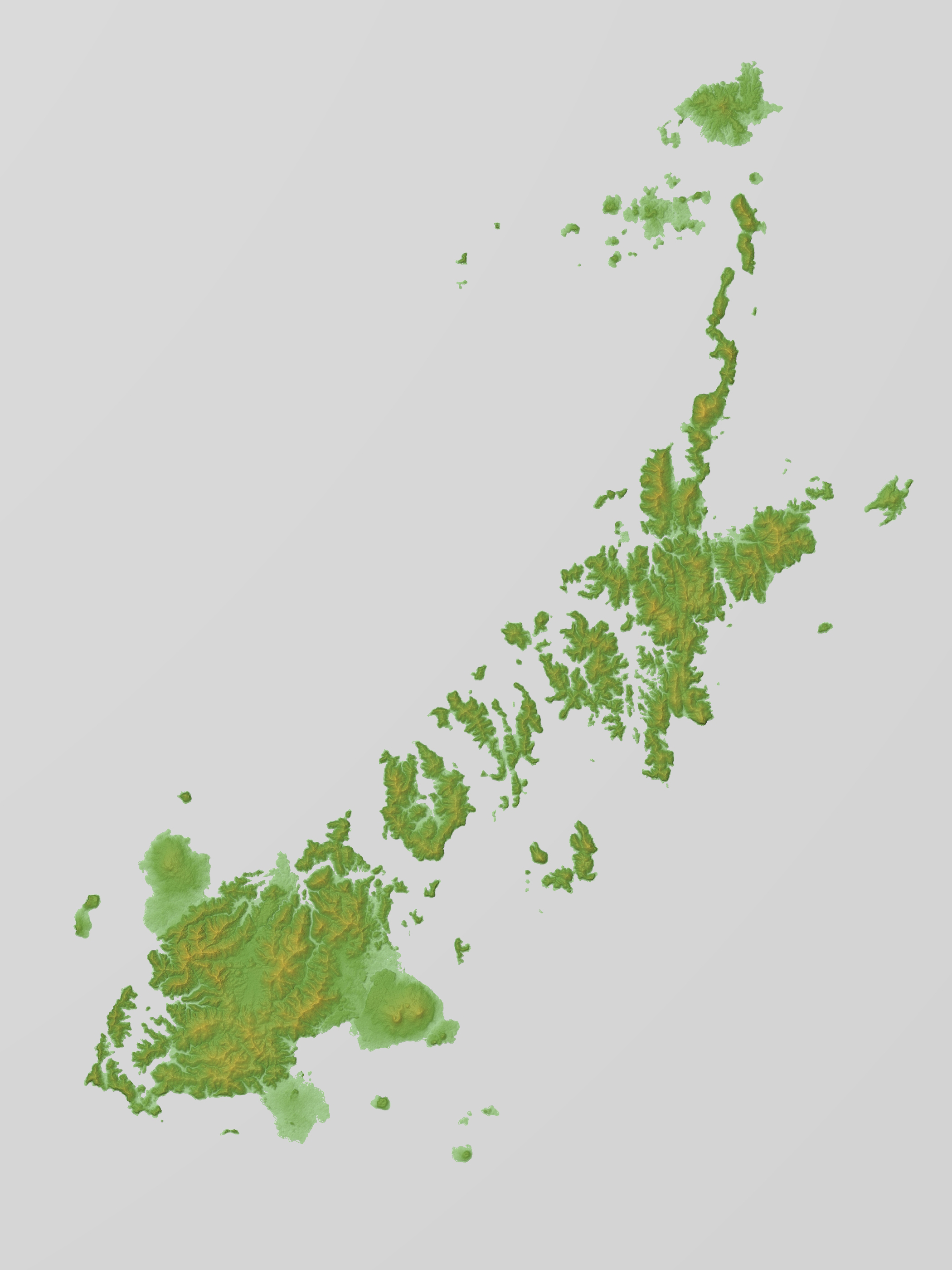
Relief Map

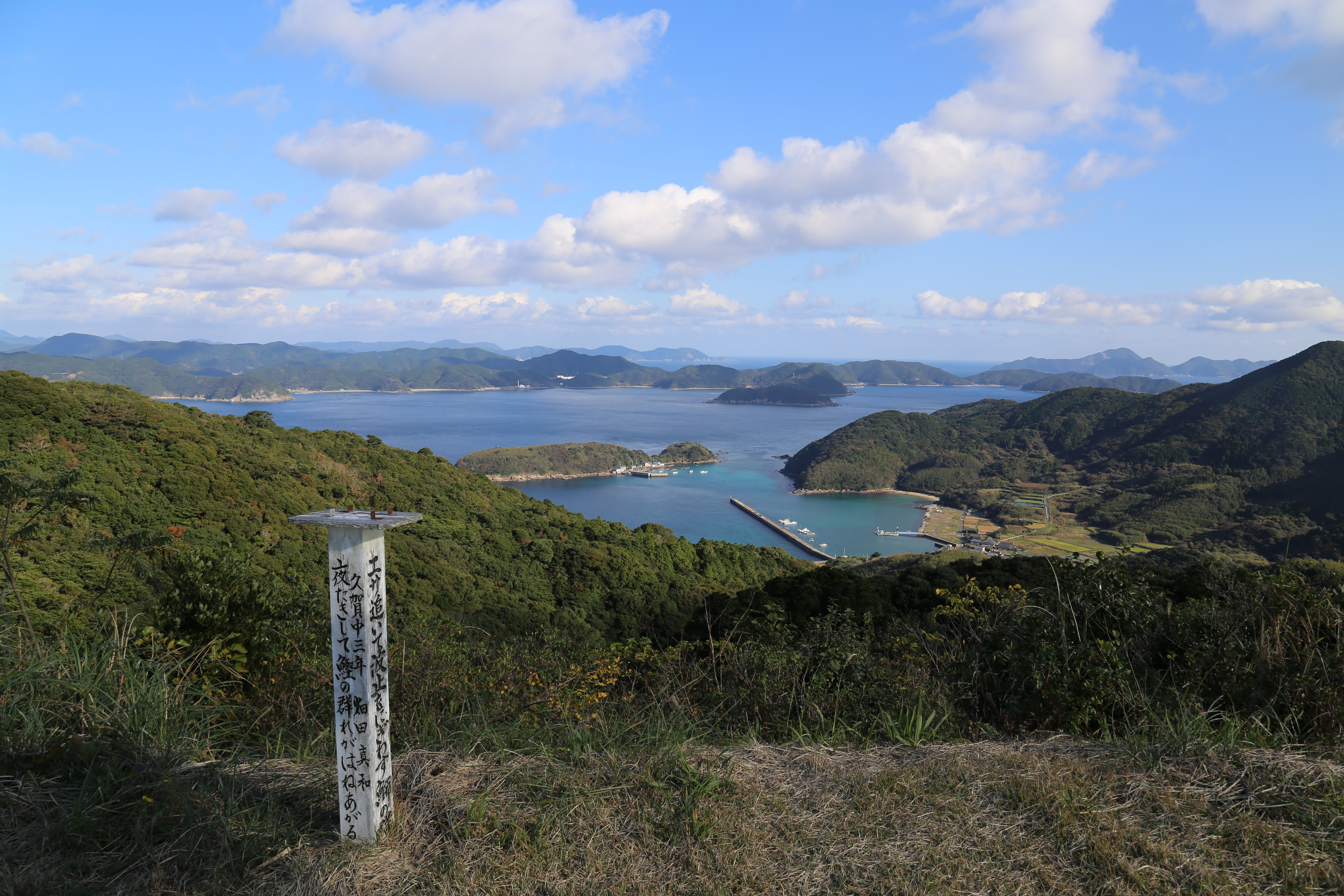
Scenery of the Goto Islands

There are 140 islands, including five main ones: Fukue Island (福江島, Fukue-jima), Hisaka Island (久賀島, Hisaka-jima), Naru Island (奈留島, Naru-shima), Wakamatsu Island (若松島, Wakamatsu-jima), and Nakadōri Island (中通島, Nakadōri-jima). The northernmost island is Ukujima.

The group of islands runs approximately 85 km (53 mi) from Osezaki Lighthouse, Fukue Island to Tsuwazaki Lighthouse, Nakadōri Island. Its center is near Naru Island at about 32°49′N 128°56′E.

To the north is Tsushima Island in the Tsushima Strait and to the east is Kyūshū and the rest of Nagasaki Prefecture. It is about 100 kilometres (62 miles) from the port of Nagasaki. The Tsushima Current (a branch of the Kuroshio) passes around the islands.

The southern of the two principal islands, Fukue, measures approximately 25 kilometres (16 miles) north-to-south by 25 kilometres (16 miles) east-to-west; the northern, Nakadōri Island, measures approximately 40 kilometres (25 miles) north-to-south by 30 kilometres (19 miles) east-to-west at its widest point. Most of Nakadōri Island, however, is quite narrow, measuring less than 6 kilometres (3.7 miles) wide for much of its length. Some dome-shaped hills command the old castle town of Fukue. The islands are highly cultivated; deer and other game abound, and trout are plentiful in the mountain streams.

As a result of a merger on August 1, 2004, the city of Gotō was established. It occupies Fukue, Hisaka, and Naru islands, and seven inhabited ones. The town of Shin-Kamigotō, itself the product of a simultaneous, separate merger in 2004, occupies Nakadōri and Wakamatsu islands, two of the five main islands of the Gotō archipelago, in addition to the small inhabited islands of Arifuku, Kashiragashima, Hinoshima, Ryōzegaura, and Kirinoko and a great number of uninhabited islets.

The small island of Kabajima is east of Hisaka Island and northeast of Fukue Island. It belongs to Gotō City.

== History ==
In the 1540s, renowned Chinese pirate king and merchant, Wang Zhi made landfall and established a base on the Gotō Islands. From which he simultaneously recruited Japanese pirates to his cause and directed important trade routes between Japan and much of Southeast Asia. In the mid 1550s, Ming Genreal Hu Zongxian led two envoys to Wang Zhi's base where the pirate lord was captured and subsequently executed in 1559.

In 1566, Portuguese Jesuit Luis de Almeida and Brother Irman Lorenzo (Japanese monk) arrived to the Gotō Islands and introduced the islands to Christianity. In 1597, Yohane Gotō (Island native) was executed in Nagasaki as apart of the twenty-six martyrs sent to death by Toyotomi Hideyoshi, which intensified the spread of Christianity (Kirishitan) across the islands. The Christianity ban of 1613 caused this growing Christian population to sharply decline until almost none were left. This was until new waves of Japanese Christians came to the islands starting in 1797.

On the 1st of April 1946, several submarines of the former Imperial Japanese Navy were scuttled off the Gotō Islands by the US forces during the "Operation Road's End". They include more than 24 submarines, being:

- First class submarines:
  - I-156, I-157, I-158, I-159, I-162, I-36, I-47, I-53, I-58, I-202, I-366, I-367, I-402,
- Second and third class submarines:
  - Ro-50, Ha-103, Ha-105, Ha-106, Ha-107, Ha-108, Ha-109, Ha-111, Ha-201, Ha-202, Ha-203, Ha-208.

On the 3rd of February 1948, the Japanese destroyer Hanazuki was sunk as a target by the USN.

== Demographics ==
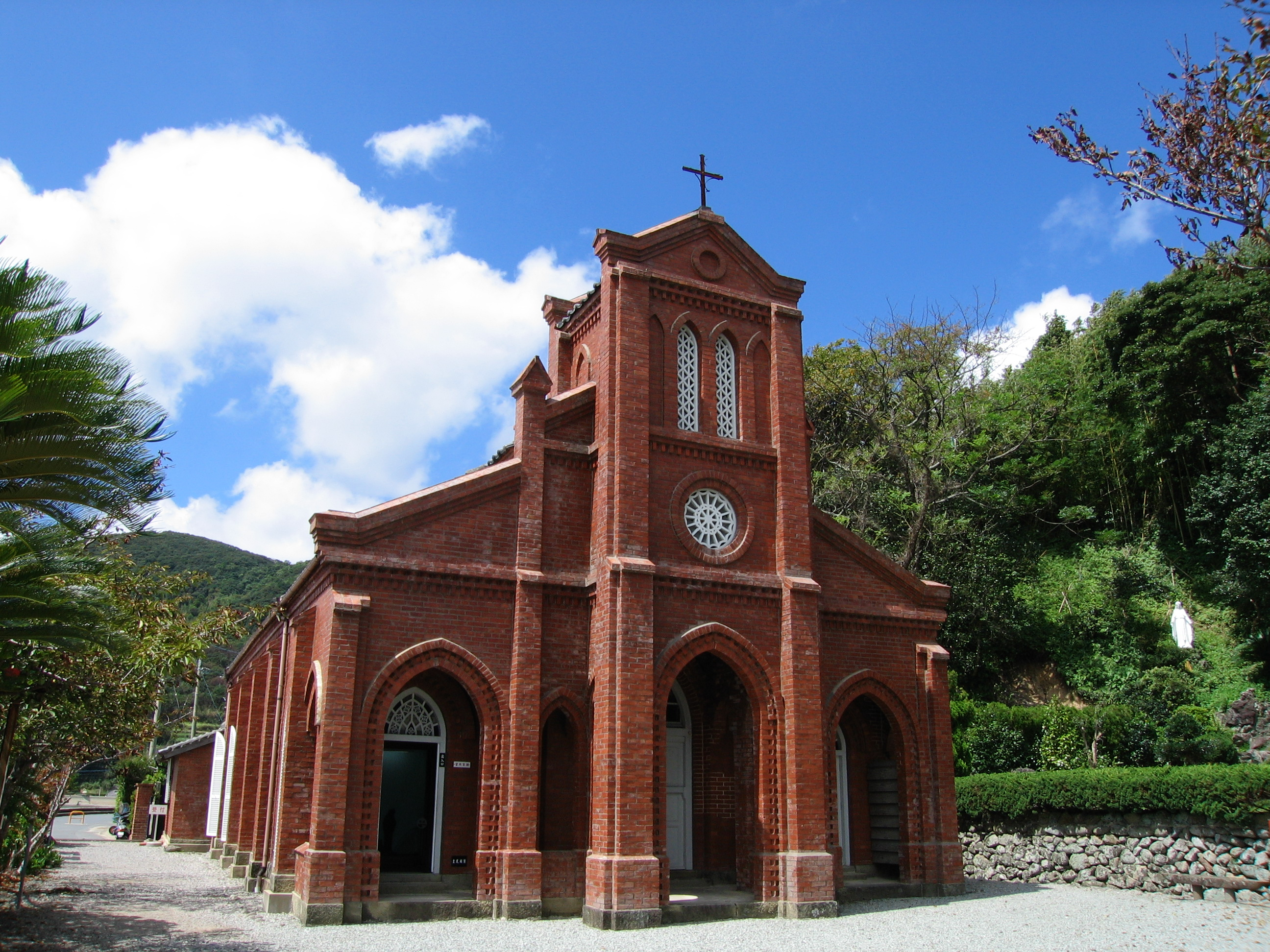
Dōzaki church

In 2005, there were 76,311 inhabitants on the islands.

An important historical element is the roots of Christianity in Japan within the islands. Some of the inhabitants are descended from Christians of the Catholic Church ("Kakure Kirishitan"), who came to their faith upon the introduction of Christianity to Japan via Portuguese missionaries in the late 16th century. These Japanese were many times persecuted and tortured by the Japanese shogunates for their beliefs, all the way into the early Meiji period. Until recently Hanare Kirishitans still lived there; the majority either returned to Catholicism after it was legalized in the 19th century or reverted to earlier practices. The islands have numerous Catholic churches, the oldest and most famous of which is Dōzaki church, built in 1868 and located about six kilometres (3 1/2 miles) north of Fukue port. The islands are part of the Archdiocese of Nagasaki.

== Products ==
Marine products, such as oysters and sea urchins, are the main products of the island. The natural camellia oil of Fukuejima is famous in Japan for cosmetic use. Kankoro Mochi is a confectionery and specialty food of the Gotō Islands made from sliced, sundried sweet potato combined with mochi.

== Tourism ==
Fukue City is a typical castle city. The historic castle in Fukue, Ishida Castle, was built last of all castles in Japanese history because year after the castle was completed Japan underwent the Meiji Restoration. Today, the castle is used as the Goto high school and is contributing to the education of young people. Most of the castle area inside the stone walls are opened for public.

== Transportation ==
The Gotō-Fukue Airport (FUJ/RJFE) is on Fukue Island.

Ferry services from Nagasaki and Sasebo are offered by Kyusyu Shosen Co. Ltd. Both standard ferry and hydrofoil services operate.

There are also regular bus services on Fukue island.

== Energy infrastructure ==
The islands are home to the Gotō City Floating Offshore Wind Farm, which is a short distance east of the Gotō City port terminal on Fukue island.

== In popular culture ==
The islands are the main setting of the documentary film Tora-san in Goto, which was shot over 22 years starting in 1993 and released in 2016. The film chronicles a large family who make their living as udon noodle makers.

== See also ==
- Barakamon — manga/anime series set on Fukue Island
- Diary of Our Days at the Breakwater — manga/anime series partially set on the islands
- Hidden Christian Sites in the Nagasaki Region
