= Fukue Domain =

Fukue Domain 福江藩
- Domain of Japan
- 1603–1871
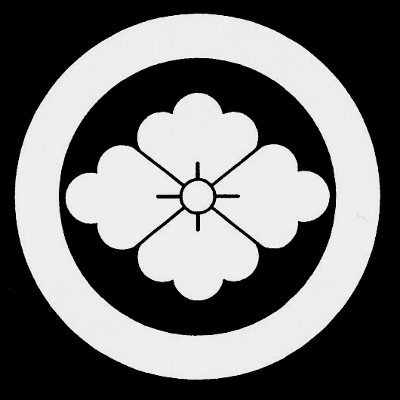
- Mon of the Goto clan

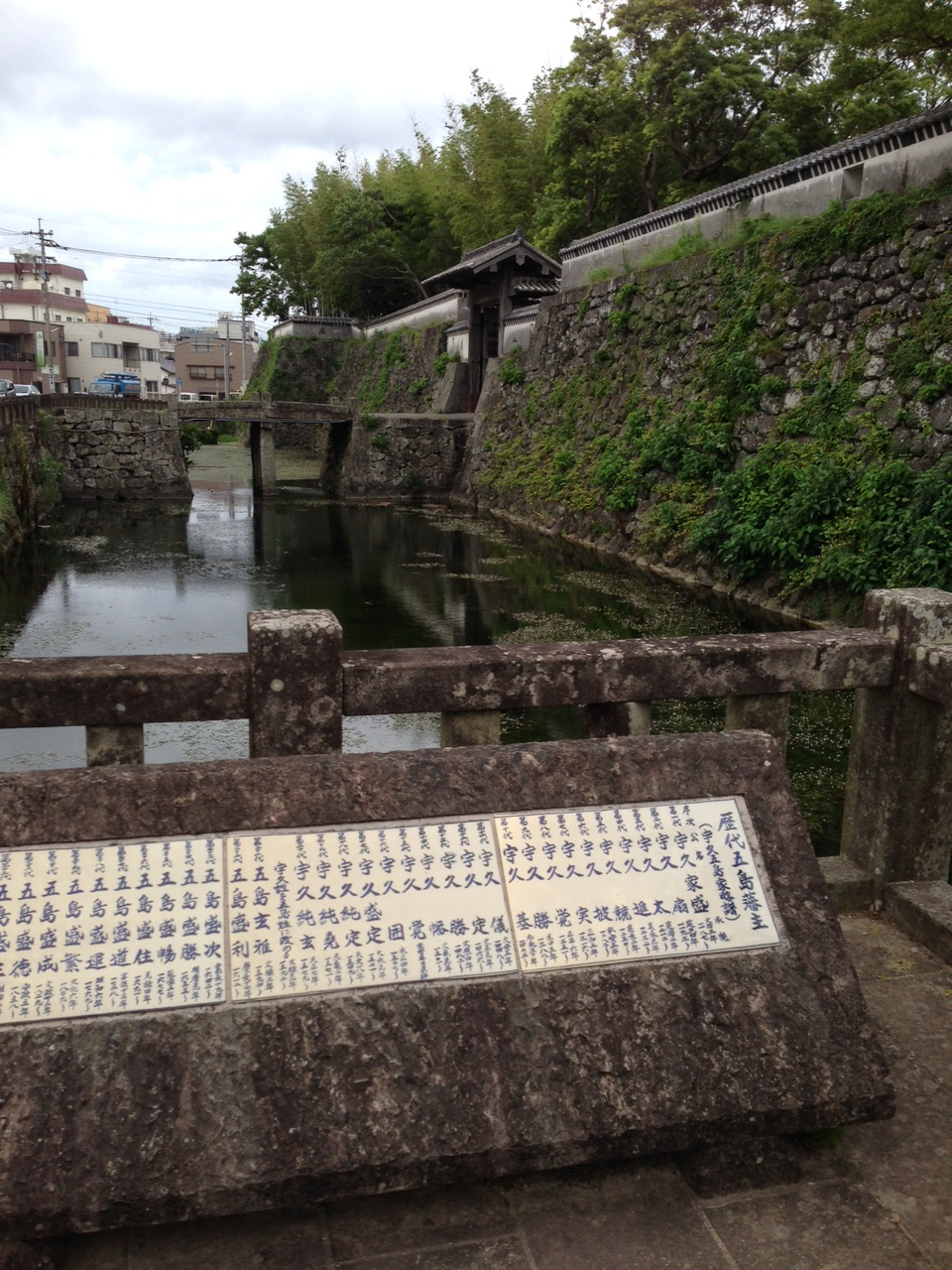
- Stone wall and Water moat of Ishida castle
- Capital: Ishida Castle
  - Type: Daimyō
- Historical era: Edo period
  - Established: 1603
  - Disestablished: 1871
- Today part of: Nagasaki Prefecture

The Fukue Domain, also known as the Goto Domain, was a prominent domain that held authority over the entirety of the Goto Islands situated in Hizen Province during the Edo period. Throughout its existence, the Goto clan, who were classified as to-doma daimyo, assumed the role of the domain's ruler, overseeing various aspects of governance and administration within the region. With a kokudaka exceeding 15,000 koku, the domain's economic prosperity was evident, especially considering that at one point, 3,000 koku was allocated to the Tomie territory, resulting in a total of over 12,000 koku. The domain's administrative center was Ishida Castle, originally known as Egawa Castle, which was under the jurisdiction of the castle lord daimyo and is presently located in Goto City, Nagasaki Prefecture.

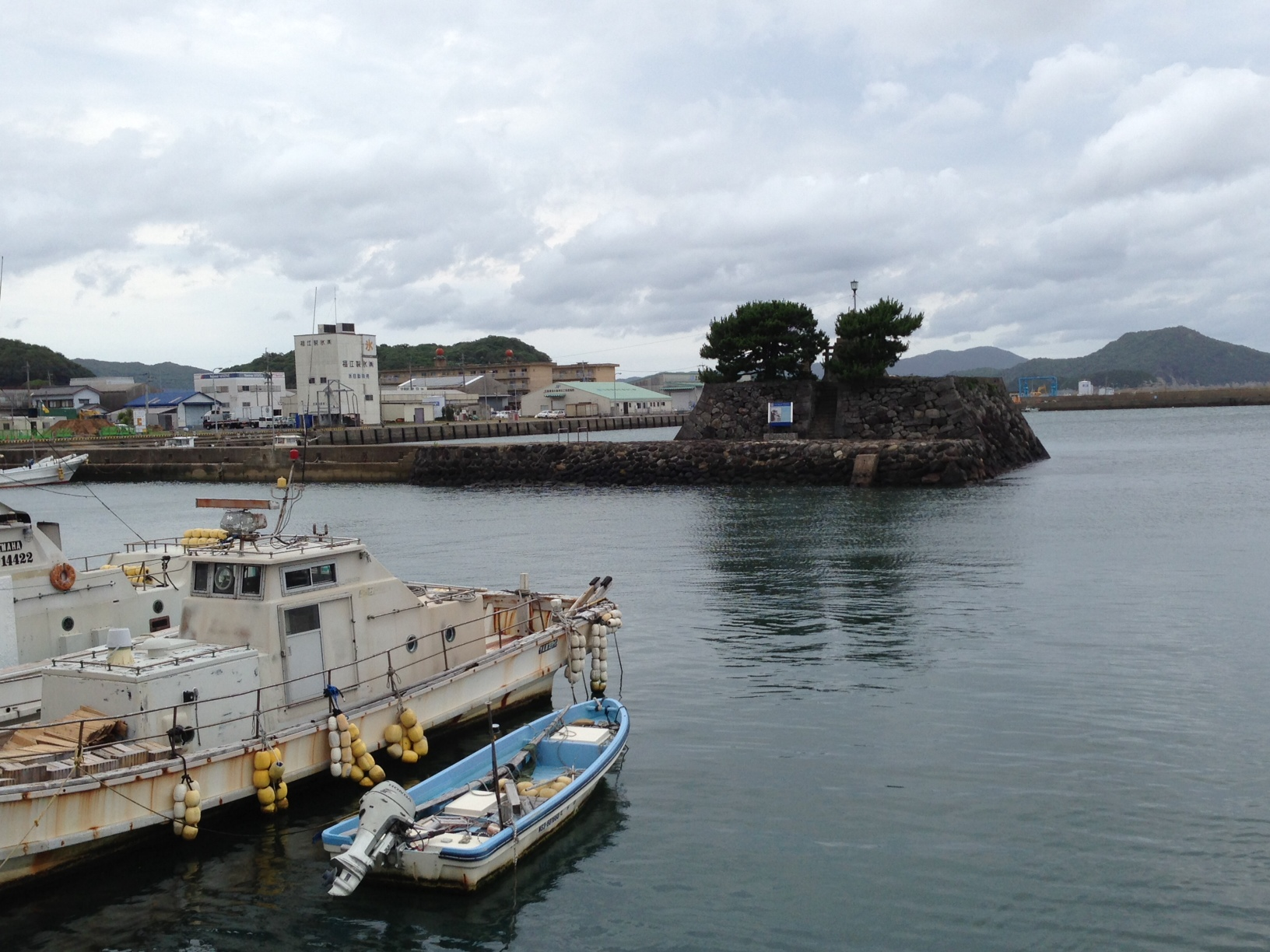
Aerial view of the Japanese lighthouse (June 2013)

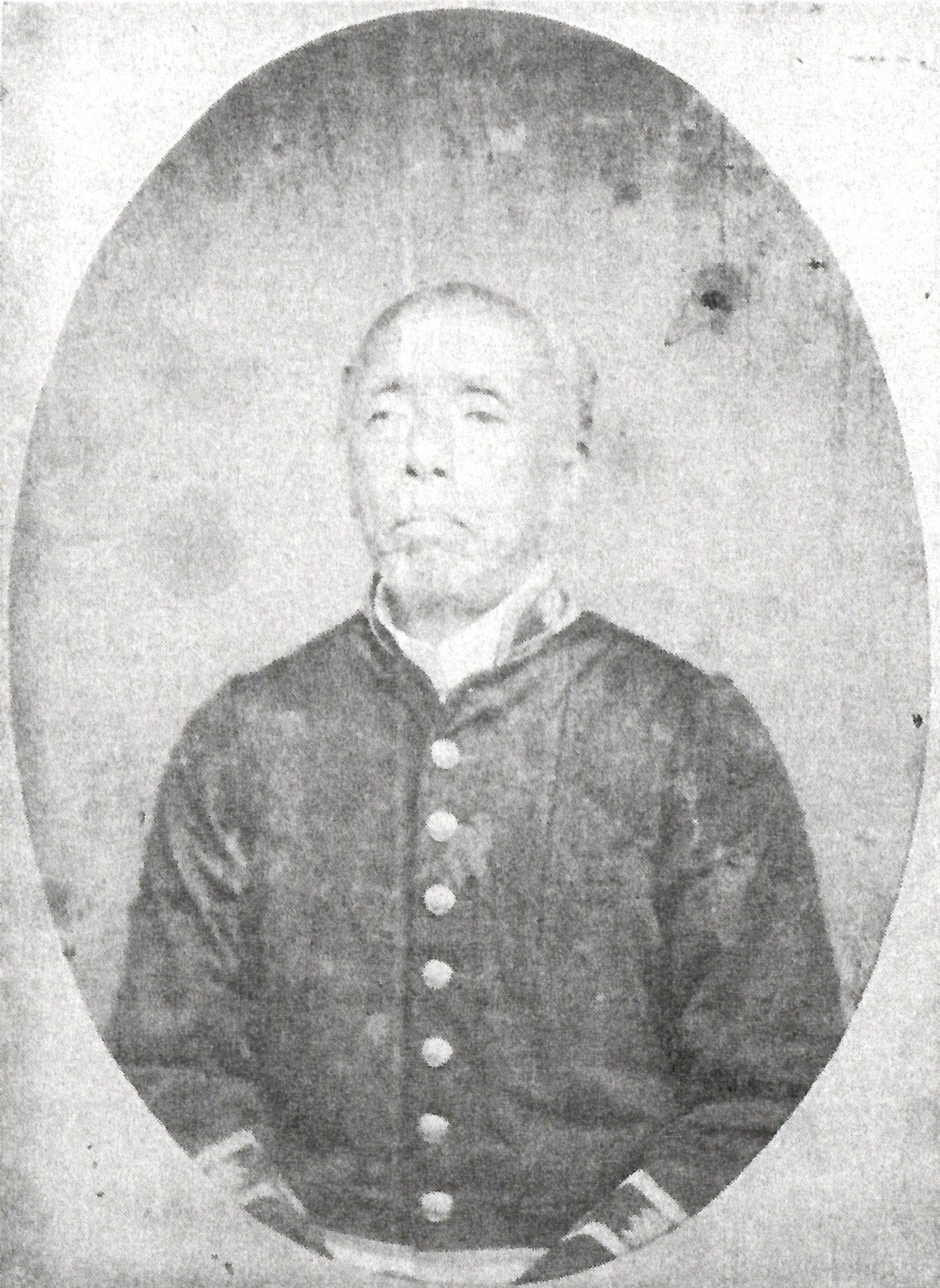
Gotō Moriakira, the 10th next to last daimyo of Fukue Domain

In the han system, Fukue was a political and economic abstraction based on periodic cadastral surveys and projected agricultural yields. In other words, the domain was defined in terms of kokudaka, not land area. This was different from the feudalism of the West.

== History ==
Gotō was settled in ancient times, and was a port of call on the trade route between Japan and Tang-dynasty China in the Nara period. Buddhist prelate Kūkai stopped at Gotō in 806. The islands came under the control of the Gotō clan, a local warlord clan specializing in trade and piracy, during the Muromachi period. The area was the center of intense European missionary activity in the late 16th century, which converted most of the population to the Kirishitan (Christian) faith. Gotō Harumasa (1548–1612) served Toyotomi Hideyoshi and participated in the Japanese invasions of Korea. During the Battle of Sekigahara he remained neutral. In 1602, after the start of the Tokugawa bakufu he pledged loyalty to shōgun Tokugawa Ieyasu, and in return was confirmed in his ancestral holdings, with revenues of 15,000 koku.

The early days of the domain were troubled by political problems, with rivalries between different factions of the ruling clan, violent clashes over fishing rights between various islands and villages, and the unpopular suppression of the Kirishitan religion per the Tokugawa bakufu's national seclusion policies. The situation became more quiescent in the 18th century with increasing prosperity due to the growth of whaling and the establishment of the separate Tomiei sub-domain (3000 koku) on Shinkamigotō.

Towards the end of the Bakumatsu period, the 10th daimyō of Fukue Domain, Gotō Moriakira began reconstruction of Ishida Castle, with the work completed by Gotō Morinori, the 11th and final daimyō. It was the last Japanese castle to be built under the Tokugawa Bakufu.

Morinori was an early supporter of the Sonnō jōi movement, and was ordered to Kyoto in October 1867 to pledge his loyalty to Emperor Meiji. He arrived in Kyoto in 1868, and the new Meiji government ordered him to strengthen the maritime defenses of his island domain against possible incursions by foreign ships. To defray the costs of this program, the new government abolished the subsidiary fief of Tomie, and added its 3000 koku to his revenues. However, the people of Tomie were highly opposed to the union with Fukue, and it was not until July 1869 that he was able to take possession of the new territories. By this time, the position of daimyō had already been abolished, and his official title was "domain governor".

On July 15, 1871, Fukue domain was abolished with the rest of the han system, and became part of the new Nagasaki Prefecture.

The former Gotō domain is now part of Gotō city, Nagasaki Prefecture.

== Tomie Domain ==
Goto Morikiyo, the 23rd leader of the Goto clan and the third lord of the Fukue Domain, was the younger sibling of Goto Moritsugu, who was the first head of the Tomie Goto family. In 1661, Goto Morikiyo was separated from the main family, the Fukue Domain, and the Tomie Domain was officially established. Following the establishment of the Tomie Domain, Tomie Jinya was constructed to serve as a government office. The kokudaka, or stipend of the domain, amounted to 3000 koku, and Goto Morikiyo was recognized as a koke and kotaiyoriai, which signified his status as a daimyo within the feudal system. During the era of Goto Unryu (Ko Zuiho), the 6th head of the family, he held various positions such as an aide to the shogun Ienari Tokugawa, a head official, a guard at Nijo Castle in Kyoto, a guard at Osaka Castle, and an envoy to different provinces. Moving forward to the time of the 7th head, Morinuki Goto, who served as an aide to Shogun Iemochi Tokugawa, the family's actual income exceeded 10,600 koku. In 1868, Goto Morinori, the lord of the Fukue domain, requested the government for assistance. Consequently, the 8th lord, Goto Moriaki, took over the territory and merged it with the Fukue domain, receiving 3,000 koku of stored rice in return. This decision was made to bolster the Fukue domain's revenue, especially for expenses related to coastal defense. However, the residents of Tomie territory rebelled against this move, leading to a violent uprising known as the Tomie Riot. In the second year of the Meiji era, the new government passed a law limiting the land allocation within the former territory to only 1,000 koku. Despite this, the allocation was deemed insufficient, prompting the government to offer land in Suttsu Town, Hokkaido as an alternative. Surprisingly, the residents did not relocate to the new area as expected.

== List of daimyō ==
	Name	Tenure	Courtesy title	Court Rank	kokudaka
Goto clan, 1603–1871 (Tozama daimyo)
1	Gotō Harumasa (五島玄雅)	1603–1612	Awaji-no-kami (淡路守)	Junior 5th Lower Grade (従五位下)	15,000 koku
2	Gotō Moritoshi (五島盛利)	1612–1642	Awaji-no-kami (淡路守)	Junior 5th Lower Grade (従五位下)	15,000 koku
3	Gotō Moritsugu (五島盛次)	1642–1655	-none-	-none-	15,000 koku
4	Gotō Morikatsu (五島盛勝)	1655–1677	Awaji-no-kami (淡路守)	Junior 5th Lower Grade (従五位下)	12,000 koku
5	Gotō Morinobu (五島盛暢)	1677 –1691	Sado-no-kami (佐渡守)	Junior 5th Lower Grade (従五位下)	12,000 koku
6	Gotō Moriyoshi (五島盛佳)	1691–1728	Yamato-no-kami (大和守)	Junior 5th Lower Grade (従五位下)	12,000 koku
7	Gotō Morimichi (五島盛道)	1728–1768	Awaji-no-kami (淡路守)	Junior 5th Lower Grade (従五位下)	12,000 koku
8	Gotō Moriyuki. (五島盛運)	1769–1809	Yamato-no-kami (大和守)	Junior 5th Lower Grade (従五位下)	12,000 koku
9	Gotō Morishige (五島盛繁)	1809–1829	Yamato-no-kami (大和守)	Junior 5th Lower Grade (従五位下)	12,000 koku
10	Gotō Moriakira (五島盛成)	1829–1858	Yamato-no-kami (大和守)	Junior 5th Lower Grade (従五位下)	12,000 koku
11	Gotō Morinori (五島盛徳)	1858–1871	Hida-no-kami (飛騨守)	Junior 5th Lower Grade (従五位下)	15,000 koku

Tomie Domain

#	Name	Tenure	Courtesy title	Court Rank	kokudaka
Gotō clan, 16??–1871 (Tozama daimyo)
1	Gotō Morikiyo (盛清)	16?? - ????	Unknown (未知)	Unknown (未知)	3,000 koku
2	Goto Seiro (盛朗)	???? - ????	Unknown (未知)	Unknown (未知)	3,000 koku
3	Goto Hisashi (盛尚)	???? - ????	Unknown (未知)	Unknown (未知)	3,000 koku
4	Goto Morimine (盛峯)	???? - ????	Unknown (未知)	Unknown (未知)	3,000 koku
5	Goto Morikyo (盛恭)	???? - ????	Unknown (未知)	Unknown (未知)	3,000 koku
6	Goto Unryu (運龍)	???? - ????	Unknown (未知)	Unknown (未知)	3,000 koku
7	Goto Morinuki (盛貫)	???? - ????	Unknown (未知)	Unknown (未知)	3,000 koku
8	Goto Moriaki (盛明)	???? - ????	Unknown (未知)	Unknown (未知)	3,000 koku
9	Goto ???? (基民)	???? - ????	Unknown (未知)	Unknown (未知)	3,000 koku
10	Goto Sochiyo (聰千代)	???? - ????	Unknown (未知)	Unknown (未知)	3,000 koku

== See also ==
- List of Han
- Abolition of the han system
