= Fukue Airport =

Fukue Airport Gotō-Fukue Airport
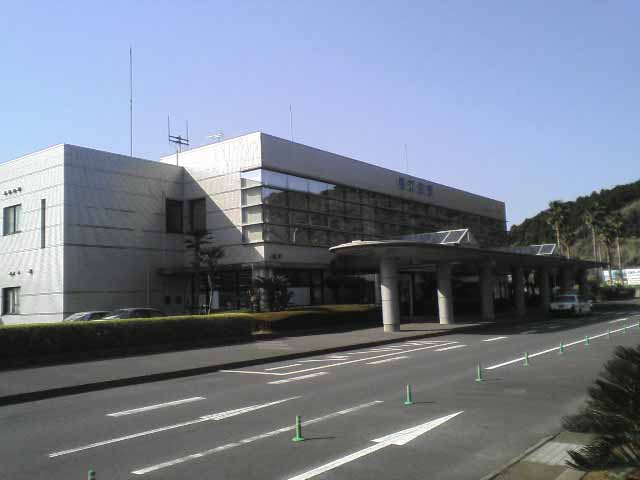
- IATA: FUJ; ICAO: RJFE

Summary
- Airport type: Public
- Operator: Government
- Serves: Gotō
- Elevation AMSL: 251 ft (77 m)
- Coordinates: 32°39′59″N 128°49′58″E

Map
- Location in Japan RJFE (Japan)

Runways
Direction	Length		Surface
Direction	m	ft	Surface
03/21	2,000	6,562	Asphalt concrete

Statistics (2015)
- Passengers: 134,308
- Cargo (metric tonnes): 203
- Aircraft movement: 5,195
- Source: Japanese Ministry of Land, Infrastructure, Transport and Tourism

Fukue Airport (福江空港, Fukue Kūkō) (IATA: FUJ, ICAO: RJFE), is a third class airport located 1.7 NM (3.1 km; 2.0 mi) southwest of Gotō, Nagasaki Prefecture, off the western coast of Kyūshū, Japan. The airport also serves the city of Fukue. It is also known as Gotō-Fukue Airport (五島福江空港, Gotō Fukue Kūkō) and, since 2014, also styled Gotō Tsubaki Airport (五島つばき空港). Currently the terminal building's exterior displays both names. Tsubaki means camellia, and is a notable reference on Fukue Island which is famed for producing camellia oil and is home to two ancient camellia trees each over 300 years old that have been declared 'national monuments'

== Summary ==
The airport opened in October 1963. It is located on the largest island in the Gotō Islands at the foot of Onidake mountain. The surrounding area is largely cultivated farmland.

A pilot for ANA remarked that the air current can be unfavorable based on the wind direction and thus landing and takeoff from this airport required skill and experience. It is also both the southernmost and westernmost airport serviced by Oriental Air Bridge.

The airport serviced 127,594 people during the 2012 fiscal year and 135,535 during the 2013 fiscal year.

== Airlines and destinations ==
Airlines	Destinations
ANA Wings	Fukuoka
Oriental Air Bridge	Fukuoka, Nagasaki
