= Fukue Island =

Largest of the Gotō Islands

Coordinates: 32°41′N 128°45′E

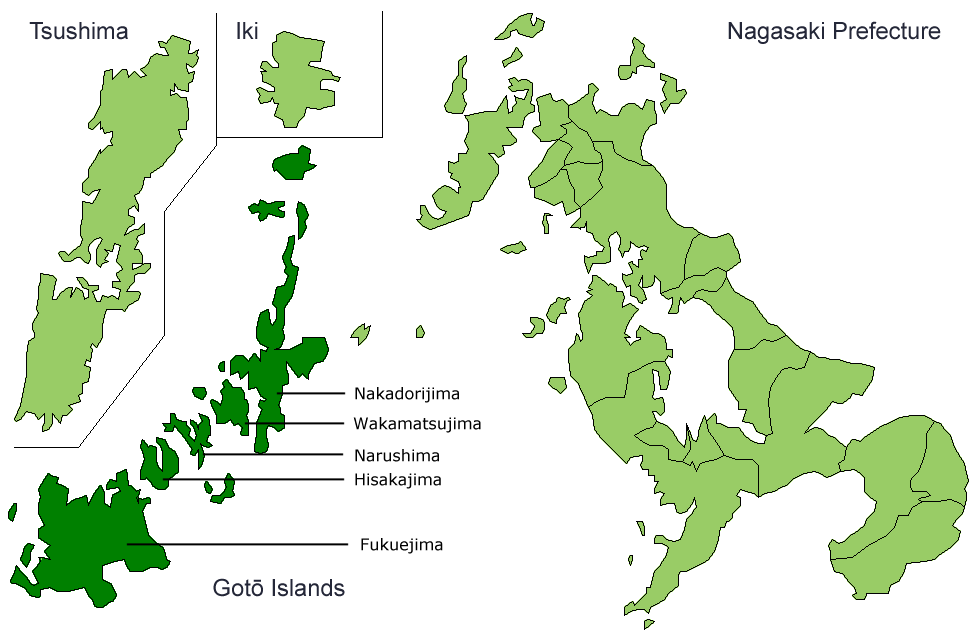
Location of Fukue Island (Fukuejima) in the Gotō Islands

Fukue Island (福江島, Fukue-jima) is the largest and southernmost of the Gotō Islands in Japan. It is part of the city of Gotō in Nagasaki Prefecture. Gotō-Fukue Airport is on this island. As of July 31, 2016, the population is 38,481.

== Climate ==
Fukue has a generally warm and very wet climate (Köppen Cfa) with hot and oppressively humid summers and cool, wet winters with practically no snowfall owing to the island's southerly latitude. Despite this, during the winter months cold water transported south from the Sea of Okhotsk by the eastern side of the Siberian High makes for very gloomy weather with scarcely any more sunshine than the “San‘in” coast from Hagi to Wakkanai. Like the rest of Kyūshū, Fukue and the other Gotō Islands are prone to typhoons during summer and autumn which can give daily rainfalls as high as 432.5 millimetres (17.0 in) on 10 September 2005 and 433.5 millimetres (17.1 in) on 7 July 1987. The wettest month on record was July 1987 with 872 millimetres (34 in) and the driest was November 1971 with 3.5 millimetres (0.1 in).

Climate data for Fukue (1991-2020, extremes 1962-present)
Month	Jan	Feb	Mar	Apr	May	Jun	Jul	Aug	Sep	Oct	Nov	Dec	Year
Record high °C (°F)	21.0 (69.8)	22.2 (72.0)	23.3 (73.9)	26.7 (80.1)	29.8 (85.6)	32.9 (91.2)	35.4 (95.7)	36.8 (98.2)	34.3 (93.7)	31.5 (88.7)	26.6 (79.9)	23.3 (73.9)	36.8 (98.2)
Mean maximum °C (°F)	17.5 (63.5)	18.8 (65.8)	20.4 (68.7)	23.6 (74.5)	27.1 (80.8)	29.0 (84.2)	32.8 (91.0)	33.7 (92.7)	31.5 (88.7)	27.6 (81.7)	23.8 (74.8)	19.5 (67.1)	33.8 (92.8)
Mean daily maximum °C (°F)	10.8 (51.4)	11.9 (53.4)	14.9 (58.8)	19.1 (66.4)	23.0 (73.4)	25.6 (78.1)	29.4 (84.9)	30.9 (87.6)	27.8 (82.0)	23.4 (74.1)	18.5 (65.3)	13.3 (55.9)	20.5 (68.9)
Daily mean °C (°F)	7.6 (45.7)	8.3 (46.9)	10.7 (51.3)	14.9 (58.8)	18.8 (65.8)	22.1 (71.8)	26.2 (79.2)	27.3 (81.1)	24.1 (75.4)	19.5 (67.1)	14.6 (58.3)	9.8 (49.6)	17.0 (62.6)
Mean daily minimum °C (°F)	4.2 (39.6)	4.3 (39.7)	6.6 (43.9)	10.4 (50.7)	14.6 (58.3)	19.0 (66.2)	23.6 (74.5)	24.2 (75.6)	20.8 (69.4)	15.7 (60.3)	10.4 (50.7)	6.0 (42.8)	13.1 (55.6)
Mean minimum °C (°F)	−0.6 (30.9)	−0.9 (30.4)	0.7 (33.3)	4.2 (39.6)	9.1 (48.4)	14.4 (57.9)	19.8 (67.6)	20.8 (69.4)	16.0 (60.8)	10.3 (50.5)	4.5 (40.1)	1.1 (34.0)	−1.6 (29.1)
Record low °C (°F)	−4.1 (24.6)	−5.4 (22.3)	−2.4 (27.7)	0.3 (32.5)	5.2 (41.4)	10.4 (50.7)	15.7 (60.3)	17.4 (63.3)	10.4 (50.7)	5.2 (41.4)	1.3 (34.3)	−1.6 (29.1)	−5.4 (22.3)
Average rainfall mm (inches)	93.4 (3.68)	109.5 (4.31)	172.1 (6.78)	216.1 (8.51)	210.2 (8.28)	324.2 (12.76)	308.8 (12.16)	239.6 (9.43)	289.2 (11.39)	132.7 (5.22)	134.1 (5.28)	108.9 (4.29)	2,338.8 (92.09)
Average rainy days (≥ 0.5 mm)	13.0	10.5	12.7	11.0	10.6	13.3	11.9	11.2	10.9	6.8	10.2	11.6	133.7
Average relative humidity (%)	66	66	68	72	75	83	84	81	78	71	70	68	74
Mean monthly sunshine hours	81.5	107.4	150.9	175.7	191.0	122.2	156.9	197.6	165.4	177.7	127.8	96.2	1,750.3
Source 1: Japan Meteorological Agency
Source 2: Japan Meteorological Agency (records)
