= Nakadōri Island =

One of the Gotō Islands

Coordinates: 32°59′N 129°05′E

中通島
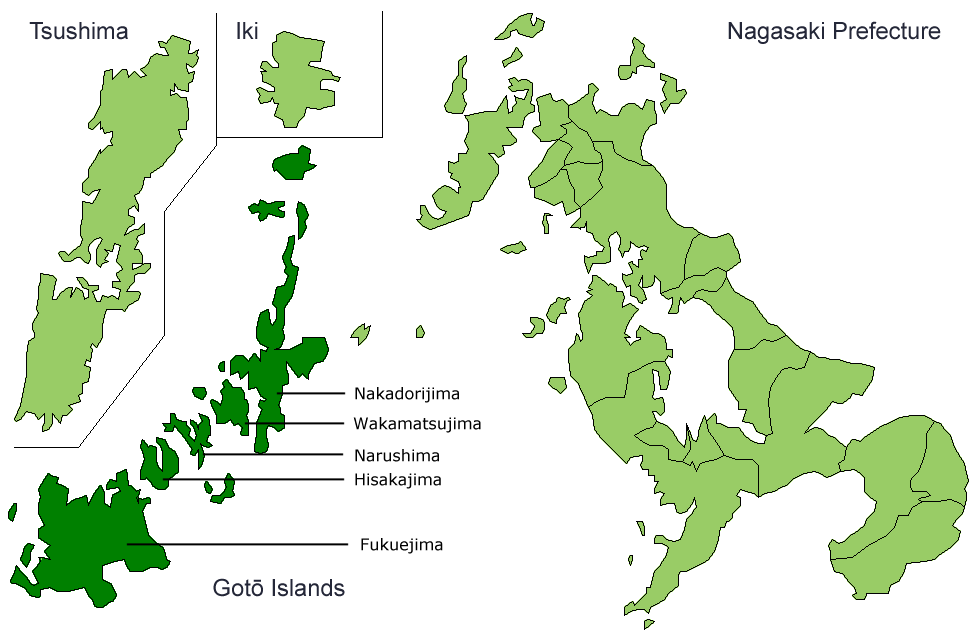
- Location of Nakadōri Island in the Gotō Islands

Geography
- Location: Sea of Japan
- Archipelago: Gotō Islands

Administration
- Japan
- Prefecture: Nagasaki

Nakadōri Island (中通島, Nakadōri-jima) is an island in the Gotō Islands, Japanese islands in the sea of Japan, off the western coast of Kyūshū. The islands are a part of Nagasaki Prefecture in Japan.

== History ==
Evidence of human settlement in the on Nakadōri Island trace back to the Jōmon period. In the Heian period, the island were used as port of calls during Japanese missions to Tang China.

In August 2004, the towns of Kamigotō, Shin-Uonome, Arikawa, Narao, Wakamatsu merged into a new town named Shin-Kamigotō.

In 2017, the island enjoyed a minor boost in tourism after Japanese idol Neru Nagahama, who grew up in Narao, released a photobook which features parts of the island.
