= Hisaka Island =

One of the Gotō Islands

Coordinates: 32°47′N 128°52′E

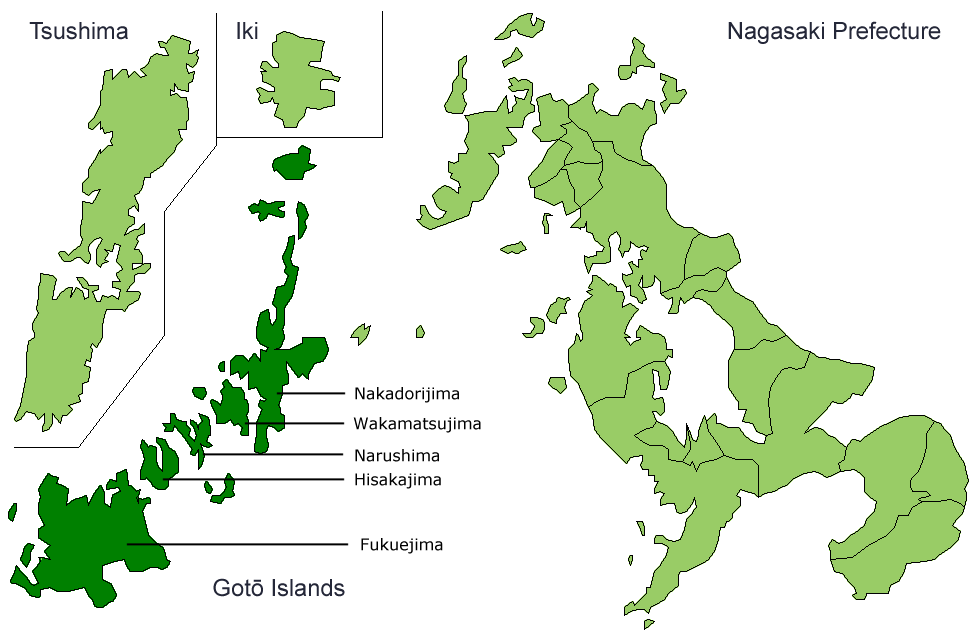
Location of Hisaka Island (Hisakajima) in the Gotō Islands

Hisaka Island (久賀島, Hisaka-jima) is one of the Gotō Islands in Japan. The island is part of the city of Gotō in the Nagasaki Prefecture. It covers an area of 37.35 square kilometres (14.42 sq mi) and has a population of 330.
