= Wakamatsu Island =

One of the Gotō Islands

Coordinates: 32°52′N 129°01′E

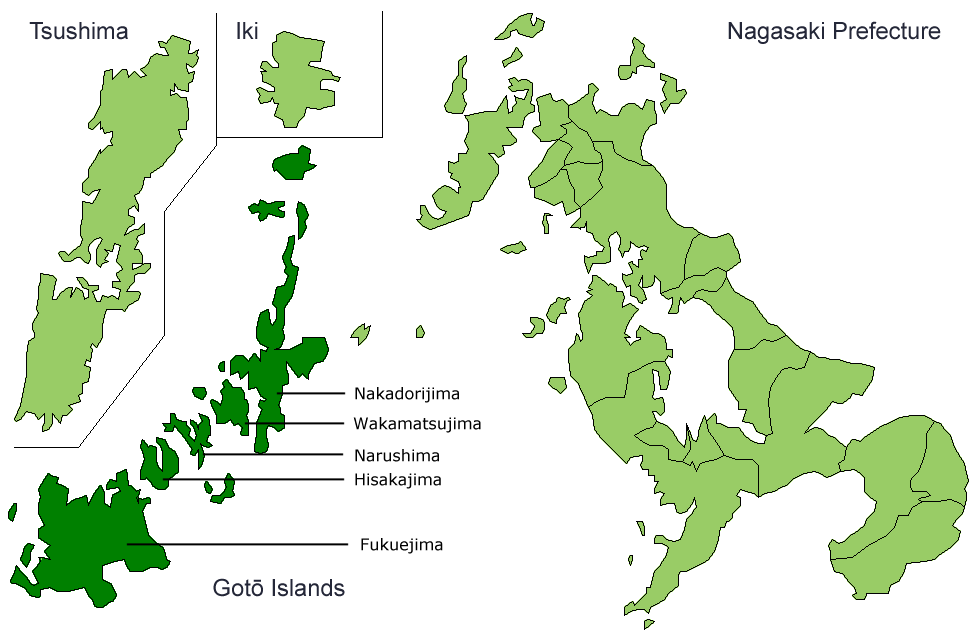
Location of Wakamatsu Island (Wakamatsujima) in the Gotō Islands

Wakamatsu Island (若松島, Wakamatsu-jima) is one of the Gotō Islands in Japan. The island is part of the town of Shin-Kamigotō in Nagasaki Prefecture.
