= Gotō, Nagasaki =

Gotō 五島市
- City
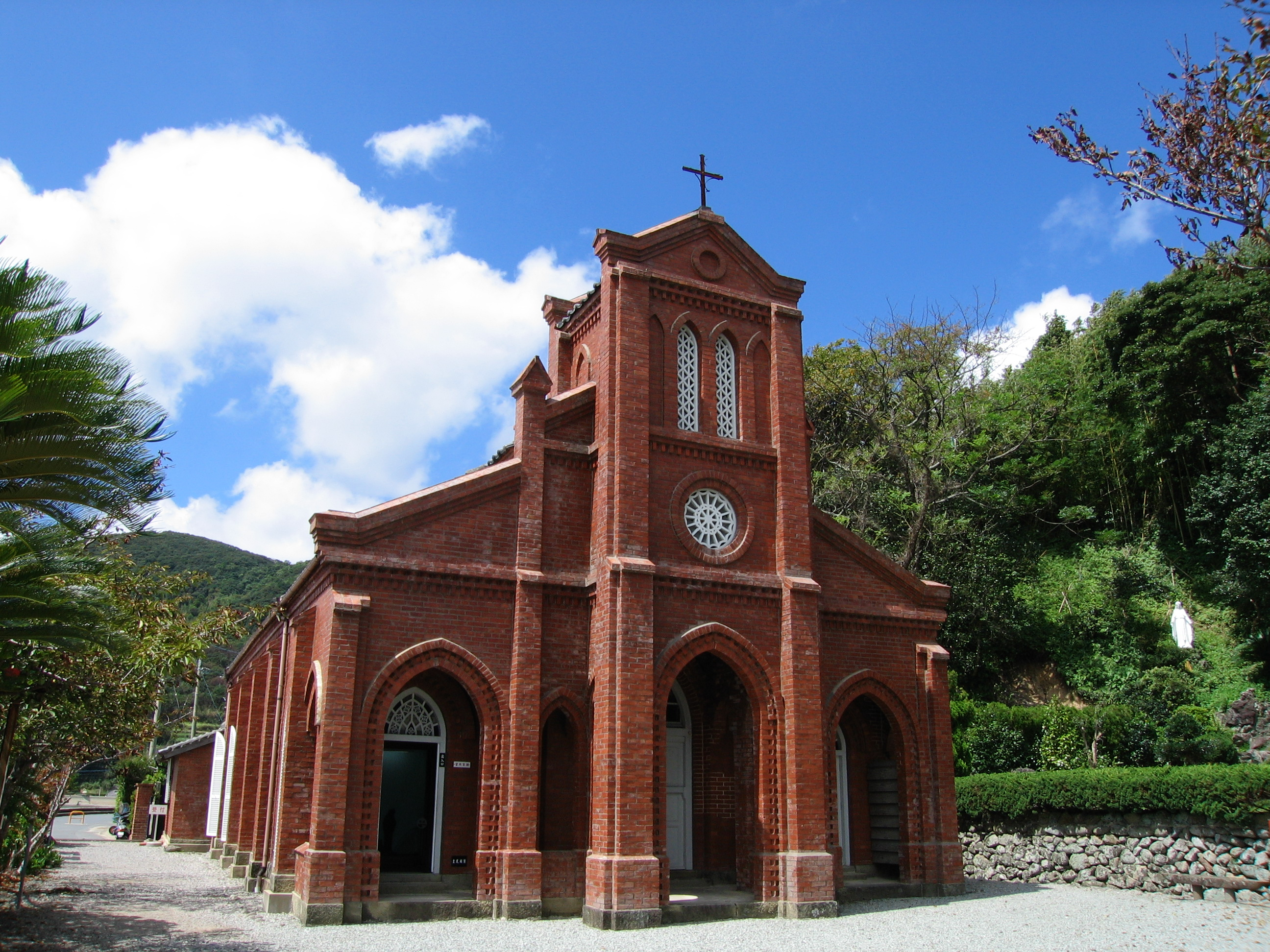
- Douzaki Church

- Flag Emblem

- Location of Gotō in Nagasaki Prefecture

- Location in Japan
- Coordinates: 32°42′N 128°50′E
- Country: Japan
- Region: Kyushu
- Prefecture: Nagasaki Prefecture

Government
  - Mayor: Futoshi Ideguchi (since September 2024)

Area
  - Total: 420.81 km^{2} (162.48 sq mi)

Population (March 31, 2017)
  - Total: 37,775
  - Density: 89.767/km^{2} (232.50/sq mi)
- Time zone: UTC+09:00 (JST)
- City hall address: 853-8501
- Climate: Cfa
- Website: www.city.goto.nagasaki.jp
- Symbols
- Bird: Japanese white-eye
- Flower: Crinum asiaticum
- Tree: Ficus superba

Gotō (五島市, Gotō-shi) is a city in Nagasaki Prefecture, Japan. It comprises the south-west half of the Gotō Islands plus (uninhabited) Danjo and Hizen Torishima archipelagos in the East China Sea. Although the core islands of the city lay some 100 kilometers from Nagasaki, the other archipelagos lay 60 km further to South-West. The city consists of 11 inhabited and 52 uninhabited islands. The three main islands of the city are Fukue, Hisaka, and Naru. As of March 31, 2017, the city has an estimated population of 37,775 and a population density of 90 persons per km^{2}. The total area is 420.81 km^{2}.

== History ==
The area which is now Gotō City was a port of call on the trade route between Japan and Tang dynasty China in the Nara period. Noted Buddhist prelate Kukai stopped at Gotō in 806. The islands came under the control of the Gotō clan from the Muromachi period and was the location of intense European missionary activity in the late 16th century, which converted most of the population to the Kirishitan faith. After the start of the Tokugawa bakufu, the area was part of Fukue Domain in the Edo period. Fukue City was established in 1954. Most of the town was destroyed in a fire in 1962.

The modern city of Gotō was established on August 1, 2004, from the merger of the city of Fukue with the towns of Kishiku, Miiraku, Naru, Tamanoura and Tomie (all from Minamimatsuura District). The population of the area has declined from over 60,000 inhabitants in 1980 due to economic migration and aging population issues.

== Geography ==
=== Climate ===
Gotō has a humid subtropical climate (Köppen climate classification Cfa) with hot summers and cool winters. Precipitation is high throughout the year, and is heavy from April to September.

Climate data for Fukue, Gotō (1991−2020 normals, extremes 1962−present)
Month	Jan	Feb	Mar	Apr	May	Jun	Jul	Aug	Sep	Oct	Nov	Dec	Year
Record high °C (°F)	21.0 (69.8)	22.2 (72.0)	23.3 (73.9)	26.7 (80.1)	29.8 (85.6)	32.9 (91.2)	35.4 (95.7)	36.8 (98.2)	34.3 (93.7)	31.5 (88.7)	26.6 (79.9)	23.3 (73.9)	36.8 (98.2)
Mean maximum °C (°F)	17.5 (63.5)	18.8 (65.8)	20.4 (68.7)	23.6 (74.5)	27.1 (80.8)	29.0 (84.2)	32.8 (91.0)	33.7 (92.7)	31.5 (88.7)	27.6 (81.7)	23.8 (74.8)	19.5 (67.1)	33.8 (92.8)
Mean daily maximum °C (°F)	10.8 (51.4)	11.9 (53.4)	14.9 (58.8)	19.1 (66.4)	23.0 (73.4)	25.6 (78.1)	29.4 (84.9)	30.9 (87.6)	27.8 (82.0)	23.4 (74.1)	18.5 (65.3)	13.3 (55.9)	20.7 (69.3)
Daily mean °C (°F)	7.6 (45.7)	8.3 (46.9)	10.9 (51.6)	14.9 (58.8)	18.8 (65.8)	22.1 (71.8)	26.2 (79.2)	27.3 (81.1)	24.1 (75.4)	19.5 (67.1)	14.6 (58.3)	9.8 (49.6)	17.0 (62.6)
Mean daily minimum °C (°F)	4.2 (39.6)	4.3 (39.7)	6.6 (43.9)	10.4 (50.7)	14.6 (58.3)	19.0 (66.2)	23.6 (74.5)	24.2 (75.6)	20.8 (69.4)	15.7 (60.3)	10.4 (50.7)	6.0 (42.8)	13.3 (56.0)
Mean minimum °C (°F)	−0.6 (30.9)	−0.9 (30.4)	0.7 (33.3)	4.2 (39.6)	9.1 (48.4)	14.4 (57.9)	19.8 (67.6)	20.8 (69.4)	16.0 (60.8)	10.3 (50.5)	4.5 (40.1)	1.1 (34.0)	−1.6 (29.1)
Record low °C (°F)	−4.1 (24.6)	−5.4 (22.3)	−2.4 (27.7)	0.3 (32.5)	5.2 (41.4)	10.4 (50.7)	15.7 (60.3)	17.4 (63.3)	10.4 (50.7)	5.2 (41.4)	1.3 (34.3)	−1.6 (29.1)	−5.4 (22.3)
Average precipitation mm (inches)	93.4 (3.68)	109.5 (4.31)	172.1 (6.78)	216.1 (8.51)	210.2 (8.28)	324.2 (12.76)	308.8 (12.16)	239.6 (9.43)	289.2 (11.39)	132.7 (5.22)	134.1 (5.28)	108.9 (4.29)	2,338.8 (92.08)
Average snowfall cm (inches)	1 (0.4)	trace	trace	0 (0)	0 (0)	0 (0)	0 (0)	0 (0)	0 (0)	0 (0)	0 (0)	trace	2 (0.8)
Average precipitation days (≥ 1.0 mm)	10.2	9.8	10.3	9.4	9.2	12.8	11.0	10.8	10.0	6.4	9.0	9.7	118.6
Average snowy days (≥ 1 cm)	0.4	0.3	0.1	0	0	0	0	0	0	0	0	0.1	0.9
Average relative humidity (%)	66	66	68	72	75	83	84	81	78	71	70	68	74
Mean monthly sunshine hours	81.5	107.4	150.9	175.7	191.0	122.2	156.9	197.6	165.4	177.7	127.8	96.2	1,745.8
Source: Japan Meteorological Agency

Climate data for Fukue Airport, Gotō (2003−2020 normals, extremes 2003−present)
Month	Jan	Feb	Mar	Apr	May	Jun	Jul	Aug	Sep	Oct	Nov	Dec	Year
Record high °C (°F)	20.3 (68.5)	21.2 (70.2)	22.3 (72.1)	24.8 (76.6)	28.6 (83.5)	31.8 (89.2)	34.4 (93.9)	36.9 (98.4)	33.5 (92.3)	30.6 (87.1)	26.0 (78.8)	22.9 (73.2)	36.9 (98.4)
Mean daily maximum °C (°F)	10.1 (50.2)	11.6 (52.9)	14.4 (57.9)	18.6 (65.5)	22.7 (72.9)	25.3 (77.5)	29.1 (84.4)	30.9 (87.6)	27.6 (81.7)	23.4 (74.1)	18.3 (64.9)	12.5 (54.5)	20.4 (68.7)
Daily mean °C (°F)	6.9 (44.4)	8.0 (46.4)	10.5 (50.9)	14.5 (58.1)	18.5 (65.3)	21.8 (71.2)	25.8 (78.4)	27.1 (80.8)	23.8 (74.8)	19.3 (66.7)	14.4 (57.9)	9.1 (48.4)	16.6 (61.9)
Mean daily minimum °C (°F)	3.3 (37.9)	4.1 (39.4)	6.2 (43.2)	9.9 (49.8)	14.3 (57.7)	18.7 (65.7)	23.3 (73.9)	24.0 (75.2)	20.8 (69.4)	15.6 (60.1)	10.2 (50.4)	5.2 (41.4)	13.0 (55.3)
Record low °C (°F)	−4.4 (24.1)	−2.6 (27.3)	−2.2 (28.0)	1.8 (35.2)	4.0 (39.2)	12.9 (55.2)	16.9 (62.4)	17.2 (63.0)	11.3 (52.3)	7.2 (45.0)	0.7 (33.3)	−1.7 (28.9)	−4.4 (24.1)
Average precipitation mm (inches)	72.8 (2.87)	111.7 (4.40)	154.4 (6.08)	197.8 (7.79)	189.6 (7.46)	317.8 (12.51)	286.2 (11.27)	201.1 (7.92)	292.0 (11.50)	123.0 (4.84)	142.5 (5.61)	111.5 (4.39)	2,200.4 (86.63)
Average precipitation days (≥ 1.0 mm)	9.4	10.3	9.4	8.7	8.9	13.2	11.8	10.4	10.9	6.2	9.1	10.3	118.6
Source: Japan Meteorological Agency

== Demographics ==
Per Japanese census data, the population of Gotō in 2020 is 34,391 people. Gotō has been conducting censuses since 1920.

Historical population
Year	Pop.	±%
1920	68,455	—
1925	65,457	−4.4%
1930	68,798	+5.1%
1935	69,951	+1.7%
1940	66,232	−5.3%
1945	86,209	+30.2%
1950	90,369	+4.8%
1955	91,973	+1.8%
1960	87,232	−5.2%
1965	78,642	−9.8%
1970	68,649	−12.7%
1975	63,410	−7.6%
1980	60,947	−3.9%
1985	57,736	−5.3%
1990	54,143	−6.2%
1995	51,295	−5.3%
2000	48,533	−5.4%
2005	44,765	−7.8%
2010	40,621	−9.3%
2015	37,327	−8.1%
2020	34,391	−7.9%
Gotō population statistics

== Events ==
Gotō used to host the Ironman Japan Triathlon. The triathlon was established in 2001, and the event was canceled in 2010. Ironman chose not to renew the race for 2011. The city now hosts the Goto Nagasaki International Triathlon using the same course for the previous Ironman event.

In late summer there is the Bon festival where people gather in the main area of Fukue and hold a parade along with street vendors. The parade features various floats all of which are lit up at night and walked through the town. At the end there is a beautiful firework show.

In winter there (usually held on the 2nd or 3rd weekend of January) is an event called "Hettomatto", also known as the 'naked man race'. Participants run along a course in a fundoshi.

== Transportation ==
Gotō-Fukue Airport on Fukue serves the city. It was established in 1963 to serve as a regional airport.
