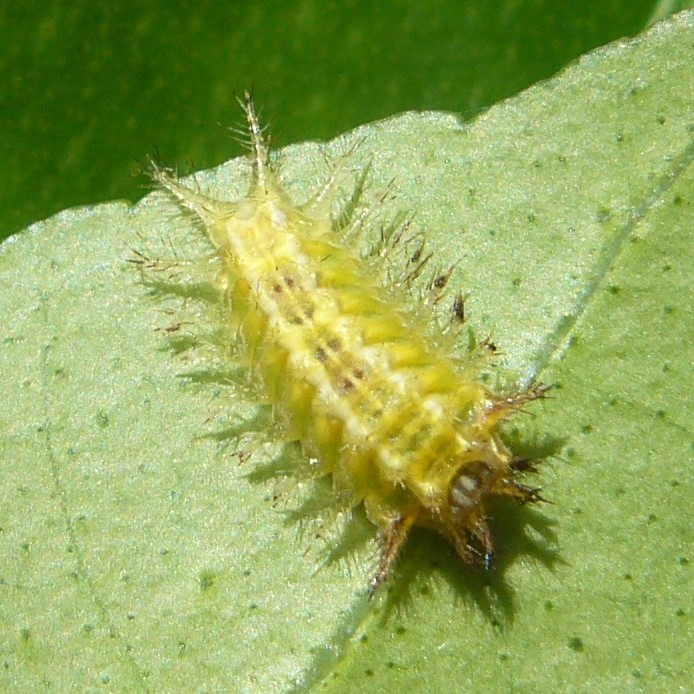
- Larval stage

Scientific classification
- Kingdom: Animalia
- Phylum: Arthropoda
- Class: Insecta
- Order: Lepidoptera
- Family: Limacodidae
- Genus: Oxyplax
- Species: O. ochracea

Binomial name
- Oxyplax ochracea (Moore, 1883)

Synonyms
- Aphendala ochracea Moore, 1883; Oxyplax weixiensis Cai, 1984

= Oxyplax ochracea =

Species of moth

Oxyplax ochracea is a species of moth in the family Limacodidae that was first described by Frederic Moore in 1883. It is found in Sri Lanka, Indonesia, India and Thailand.

It is a pest of orange, tea, and Camellia oleifera.
