= Tea seed oil =

Oil obtained from the tea plant

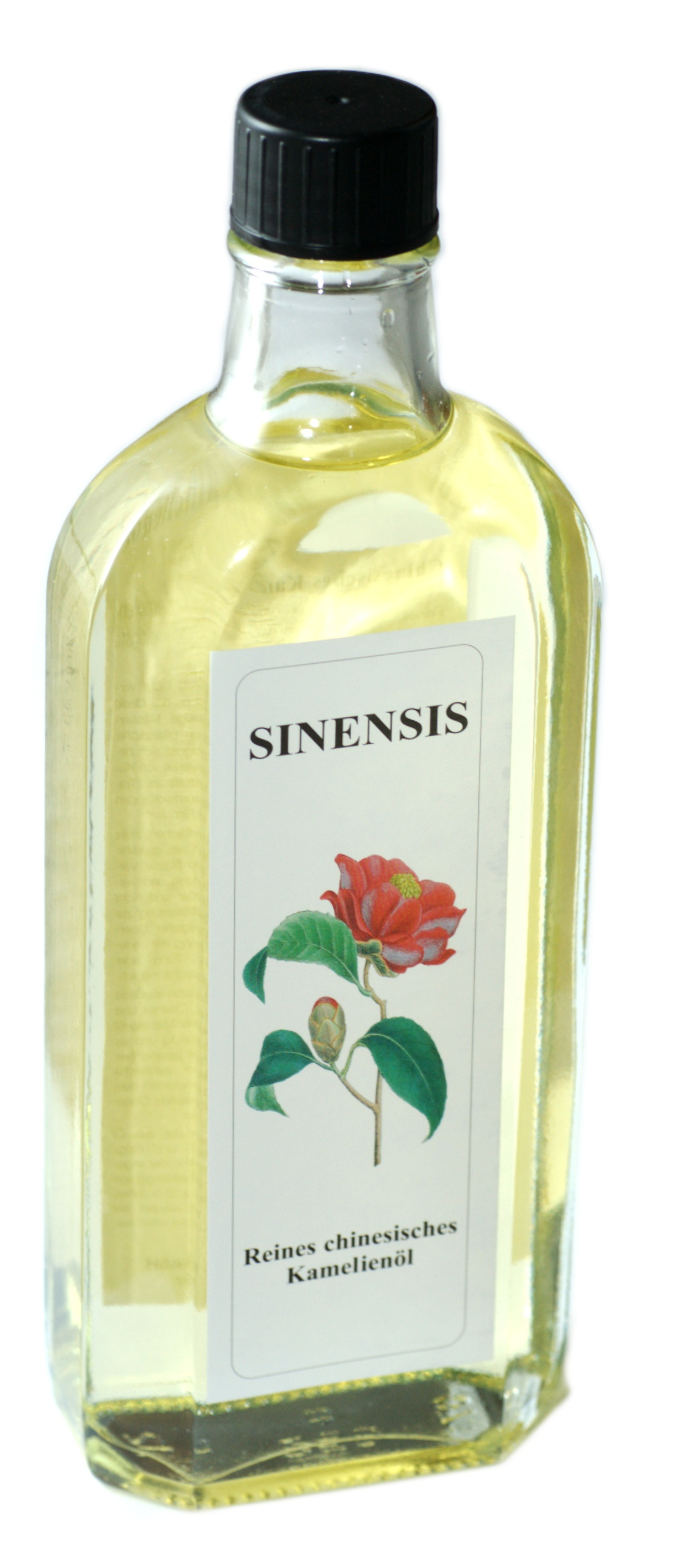
Tea seed oil

Tea seed oil (also known as camellia oil) is an edible plant oil. It is obtained primarily from the seeds of Camellia oleifera or Camellia sasanqua, which is cultivated mainly in China for edible oil production. In Japan, the seeds of a closely related species Camellia japonica (Japanese: ツバキ, romanized: tsubaki) is used instead.

Tea oil has traditionally been used both as a high-grade edible oil and for cosmetic and hair care purposes, and is known for its light texture and high oleic acid content.

== Description ==
The genus Camellia includes several commercially important species. Camellia oleifera is grown mainly in China for vegetable oil, while Camellia japonica is cultivated primarily in Japan for hair oil and cosmetic purposes. The oil is known as 'camellia oil', 'tea seed oil', 'camellia seed oil', or 'tsubaki oil'. Wild Camellia oleifera contains ~47% oil, whilst cultivated varieties have shown oil content from 42 to 53%. Oil analysis of cultivated varieties showed : ~76-82% oleic acid; 5-11% linoleic acid; 7.5-10% palmitic acid; 1.5-3% stearic acid - the ratios are similar to that found in wild oleifera. The composition is similar to that of Olive oil. Another analysis of several cultivars found : 82-84% unsaturated acids of which 68-77% oleic acid; and 7-14% polyunsaturated acids.

== Uses ==
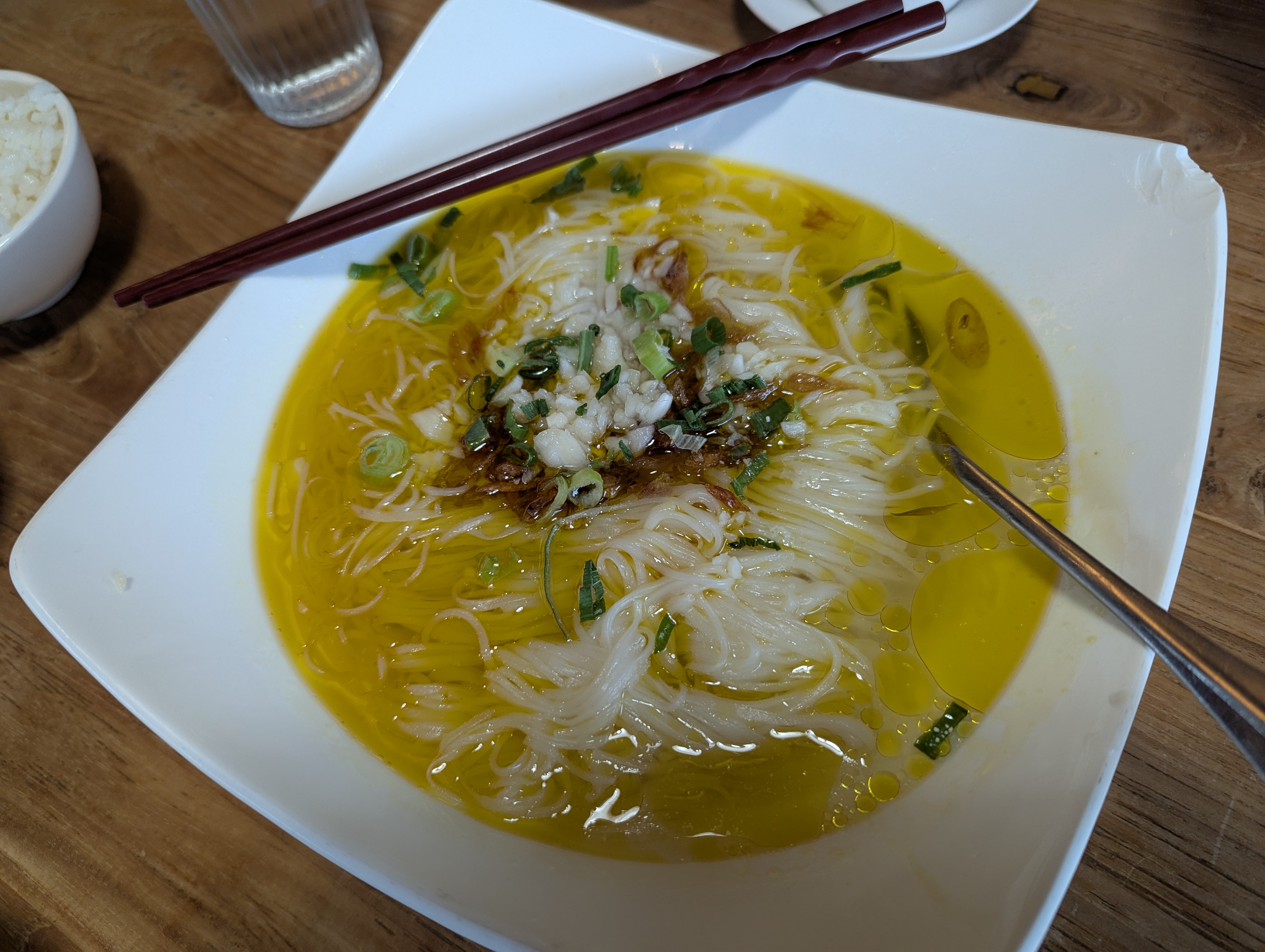
Noodles flavored with tea seed oil (苦茶油麵線), served in Maokong, Taiwan.

With its high smoke point of 252 °C (486 °F), tea seed oil is the main cooking oil in some of the southern provinces of People's Republic of China, such as Hunan, especially in mountainous regions; roughly one-seventh of the country's population.

In Japan, tsubaki oil has a wide range of traditional uses beyond cooking. As an edible oil, it is used for tempura, stir-frying, and salad dressings. Goto udon, a noodle specialty of Nagasaki Prefecture, has a tradition of coating the dough with local tsubaki oil during the stretching process, giving the noodles their characteristic silky texture. In cosmetics, it is used as a hair oil, for skin care, and as a moisturizer; oil produced on the Goto Islands and Izu Islands is particularly prized for its purity. It is also listed in the Japanese Pharmacopoeia as a fatty oil derived from the seeds of Camellia japonica for pharmaceutical applications,traditionally applied to protect Japanese swords and carbon steel blades from rust, and used to clean and polish shogi boards and pieces.

== Cautions ==
Tea seed oil should not be mistaken for tea tree oil (Melaleuca oil), an inedible essential oil extracted from the leaves of the paperbark, Melaleuca alternifolia, which is used for medicinal purposes.

== See also ==
- Camellia japonica, source of tsubaki oil, traditionally used in Japan as an edible oil and for hair and skin care
- Camellia sinensis, for tea production.
