= Daisen, Tottori =

Daisen 大山町
- Town
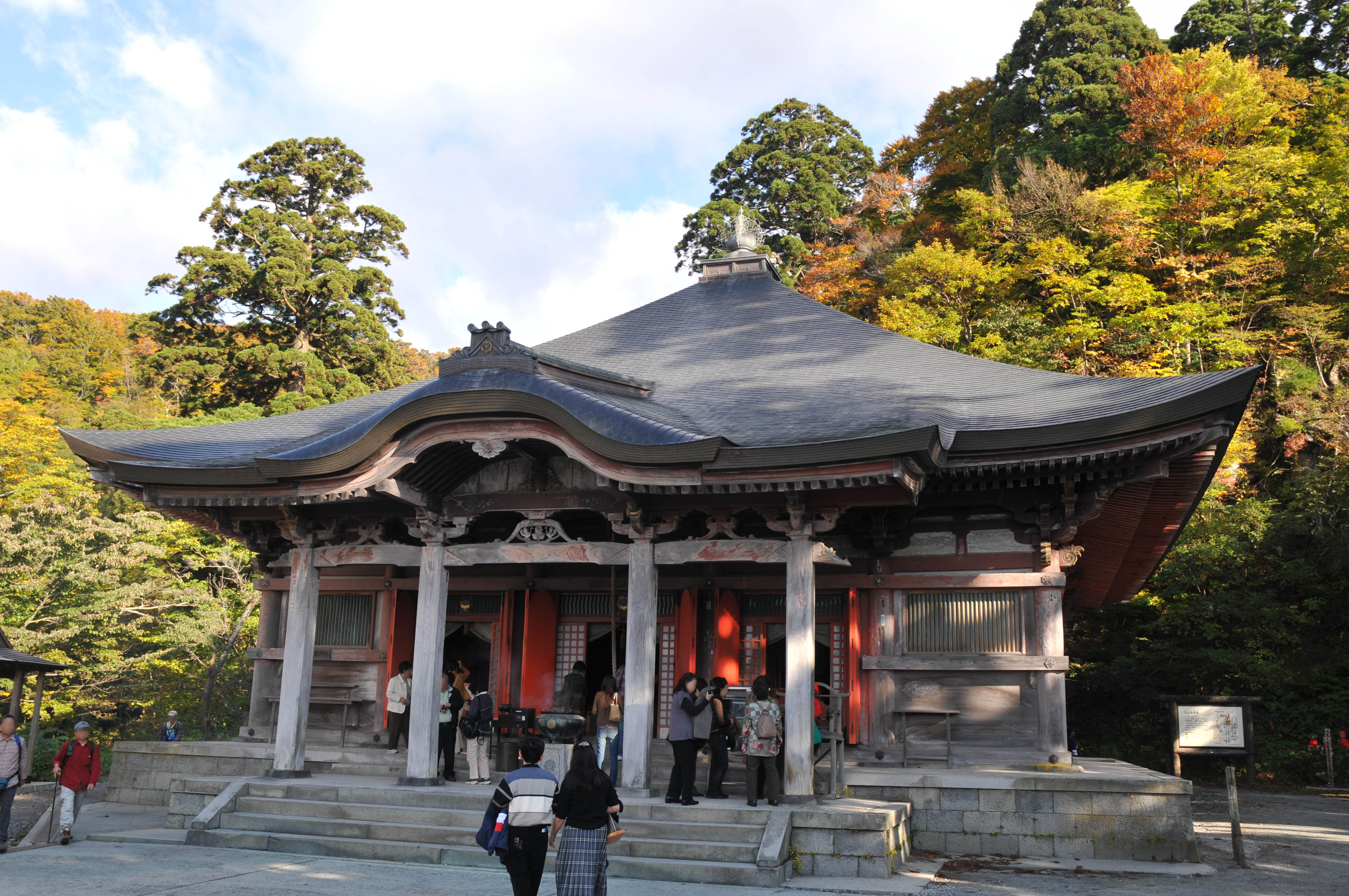
- Daisen Temple

- Flag Emblem
- Interactive map of Daisen
- Location in Japan
- Coordinates: 35°30′N 133°30′E
- Country: Japan
- Region: Chūgoku; San'in
- Prefecture: Tottori
- District: Saihaku

Government
  - Mayor: Takayuki Yamaguchi (since April 2005)

Area
  - Total: 189.83 km^{2} (73.29 sq mi)

Population (January 1, 2023)
  - Total: 15,321
  - Density: 80.709/km^{2} (209.04/sq mi)
- Time zone: UTC+09:00 (JST)
- City hall address: 328 Mikushiya, Daisen, Saihaku-gun, Tottori-ken 689-3211
- Climate: Cfa
- Website: Official website
- Symbols
- Flower: Camellia sasanqua
- Tree: Taxus cuspidata

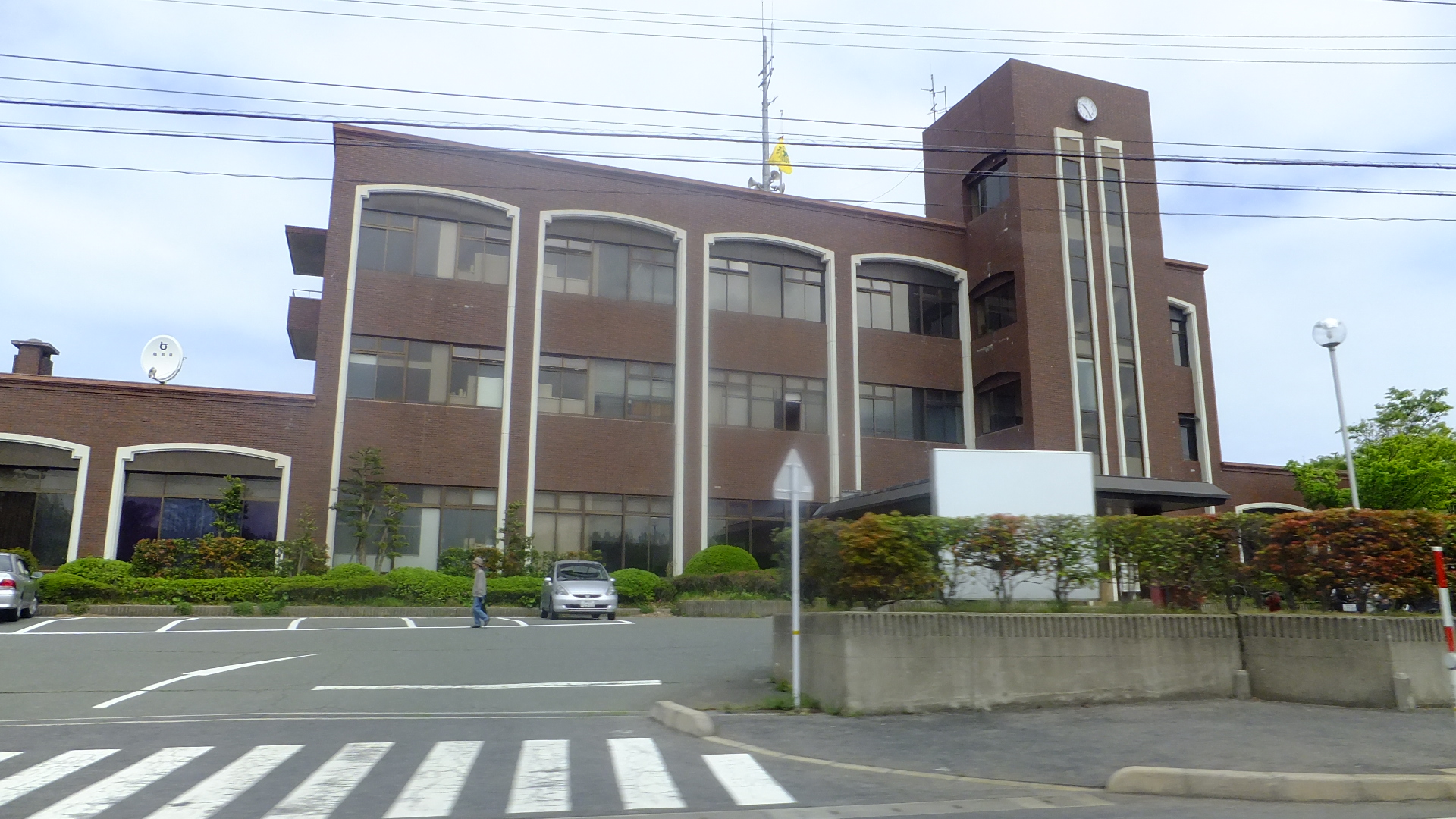
Daisen Town Hall

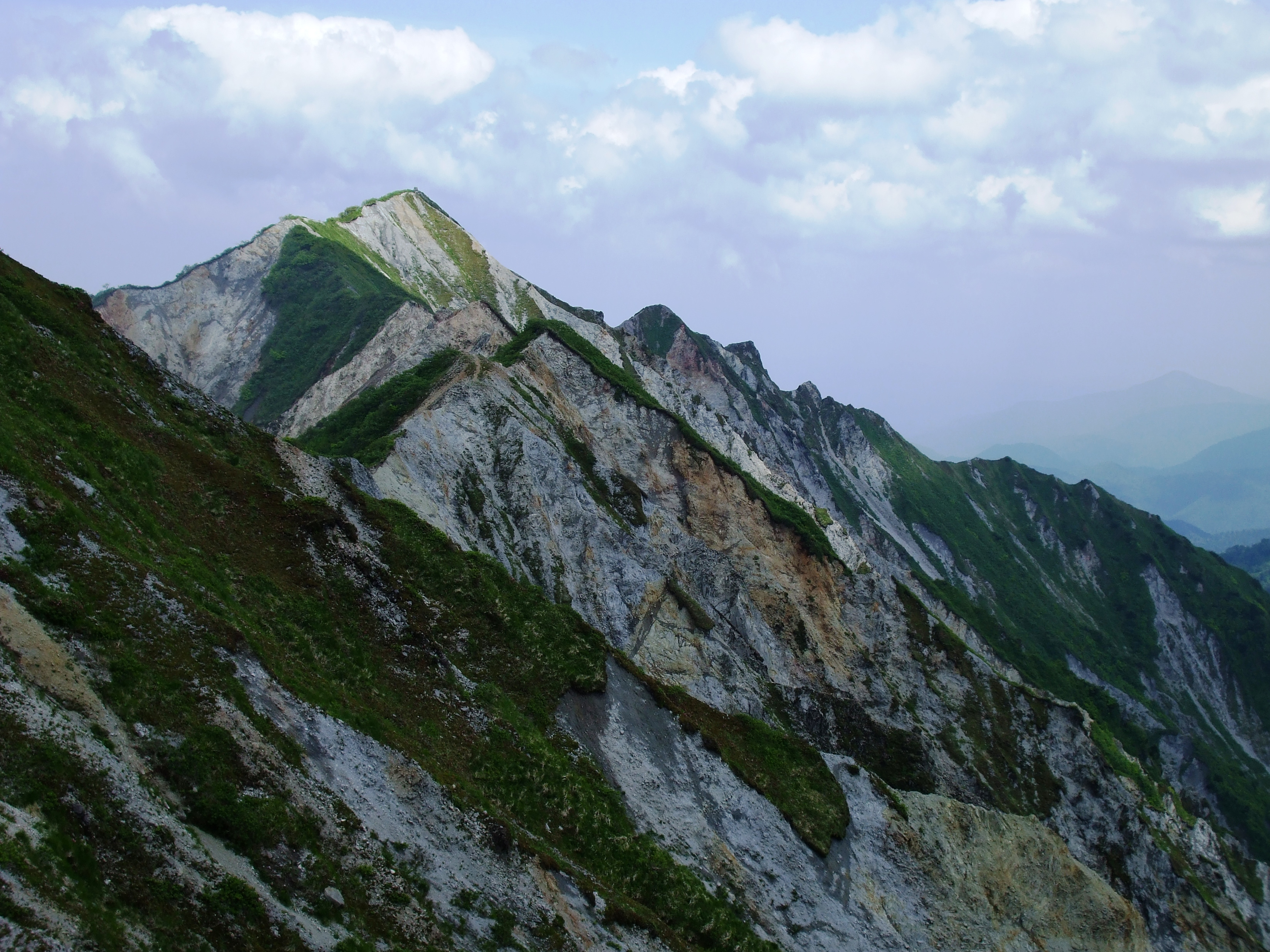
Mount Daisen

Daisen (大山町, Daisen-chō) is a town located in Saihaku District, Tottori Prefecture, Japan. As of 31 December 2022, the town had an estimated population of 15,321 in 5630 households and a population density of 81 persons per km^{2}. The total area of the town is 189.83 square kilometres (73.29 sq mi). The town is known for Mount Daisen, the tallest mountain in the Chūgoku Region. The mountain was an early center of Shinto and Buddhist practice, and the town has numerous designated Cultural Properties of Japan.

== Geography ==
Daisen is located in western Tottori Prefecture, in the west of Saihaku District. The north of the town has a broad coast along the Sea of Japan, and its inland area sweeps up to the Chūgoku Region, specifically Mount Daisen. The Amida River flows north towards the Sea of Japan and forms an alluvial delta in Daisen. Much of the town is within the borders of the Daisen-Oki National Park.

=== Neighboring municipalities ===
Tottori Prefecture

- Yonago
- Kōfu
- Hōki
- Kotoura

=== Climate ===
Chizu has a humid subtropical climate (Köppen Cfa) characterized by warm, wet summers and cold winters with heavy snowfall. The average annual temperature in Chizu is 15.0 °C (59.0 °F). The average annual rainfall is 1,801.6 mm (70.93 in) with September as the wettest month. The temperatures are highest on average in August, at around 26.3 °C (79.3 °F), and lowest in January, at around 5.0 °C (41.0 °F). Its record high is 37.2 °C (99.0 °F), reached on 22 August 2018, and its record low is −7.6 °C (18.3 °F), reached on 26 February 2011.

Climate data for Daisen (1991−2020 normals, extremes 1977−present)
Month	Jan	Feb	Mar	Apr	May	Jun	Jul	Aug	Sep	Oct	Nov	Dec	Year
Record high °C (°F)	20.6 (69.1)	23.9 (75.0)	28.4 (83.1)	31.0 (87.8)	31.4 (88.5)	34.6 (94.3)	35.7 (96.3)	37.2 (99.0)	36.5 (97.7)	32.7 (90.9)	27.7 (81.9)	24.6 (76.3)	37.2 (99.0)
Mean daily maximum °C (°F)	8.2 (46.8)	8.9 (48.0)	12.1 (53.8)	17.0 (62.6)	21.5 (70.7)	24.4 (75.9)	28.5 (83.3)	30.1 (86.2)	26.2 (79.2)	21.4 (70.5)	16.4 (61.5)	11.0 (51.8)	18.8 (65.9)
Daily mean °C (°F)	5.0 (41.0)	5.4 (41.7)	8.0 (46.4)	12.6 (54.7)	17.1 (62.8)	20.8 (69.4)	25.1 (77.2)	26.3 (79.3)	22.6 (72.7)	17.5 (63.5)	12.5 (54.5)	7.5 (45.5)	15.0 (59.1)
Mean daily minimum °C (°F)	2.0 (35.6)	1.8 (35.2)	3.7 (38.7)	7.8 (46.0)	12.5 (54.5)	17.4 (63.3)	22.1 (71.8)	22.9 (73.2)	19.1 (66.4)	13.6 (56.5)	8.6 (47.5)	4.2 (39.6)	11.3 (52.4)
Record low °C (°F)	−6.3 (20.7)	−7.6 (18.3)	−3.2 (26.2)	−0.9 (30.4)	3.3 (37.9)	8.6 (47.5)	12.9 (55.2)	15.5 (59.9)	8.3 (46.9)	4.7 (40.5)	0.9 (33.6)	−3.6 (25.5)	−7.6 (18.3)
Average precipitation mm (inches)	160.8 (6.33)	113.8 (4.48)	123.3 (4.85)	100.2 (3.94)	111.3 (4.38)	157.1 (6.19)	207.8 (8.18)	143.0 (5.63)	230.4 (9.07)	136.4 (5.37)	141.0 (5.55)	176.6 (6.95)	1,801.6 (70.93)
Average precipitation days (≥ 1.0 mm)	18.7	14.4	13.7	10.1	9.5	10.6	12.0	10.0	12.1	10.9	13.6	18.0	153.6
Mean monthly sunshine hours	71.0	89.1	148.0	189.2	205.5	160.8	177.9	214.9	149.9	152.5	110.3	78.6	1,747.7
Source: Japan Meteorological Agency

== Demography ==
Per Japanese census data, the population of Daisen has been as follows. The population has been slowly declining since the 1950s

Historical population
Year	Pop.	±%
1950	28,650	—
1960	26,140	−8.8%
1970	22,626	−13.4%
1980	22,356	−1.2%
1990	21,508	−3.8%
2000	19,561	−9.1%
2010	17,503	−10.5%

== History ==
The area of Daisen was part of ancient Hōki Province. During the Edo period, it was controlled by the Ikeda clan of Tottori Domain. Following the Meiji restoration, the area was organized into villages within Saihaku District, Tottori with the creation of the modern municipalities system in 1896. The town of Daisen was formed from the merger of the towns of Nakayama and Nawa, both from Saihaku District on March 28, 2005.

== Government ==
Daisen has a mayor-council form of government with a directly elected mayor and a unicameral town council of 16 members. Kotoura, collectively with the other municipalities of Saihaku District, contributes two members to the Tottori Prefectural Assembly. In terms of national politics, the town is part of Tottori 2nd district of the lower house of the Diet of Japan.

== Economy ==
The economy of Daisen is based agriculture and seasonal tourism.

== Education ==
Daisen has four public elementary schools and three public junior high schools operated by the town government. The town does not have high school.

== Transportation ==
=== Railway ===
JR West - San'in Line

- Daisenguchi - Nawa - Mikuriya - Shimoichi - Nakayamaguchi

=== Highway ===
- San'in Expressway
- National Route 9

== Sister cities ==
Daisen has maintained international relations with Temecula, California in the United States since 1994.

== Local attractions ==
- Daisen-ji
- Mount Daisen
- Mukibanda Yayoi remains
- Ōgamiyama Shrine
- Nawa Shrine

== Noted people from Daisen ==
- Shigeru Fukudome, admiral and Chief of Staff of the Imperial Japanese Navy during World War II.
