= Shimoichi Station =

Railway station located in Daisen, Tottori Prefecture, Japan

Shimoichi Station 下市駅
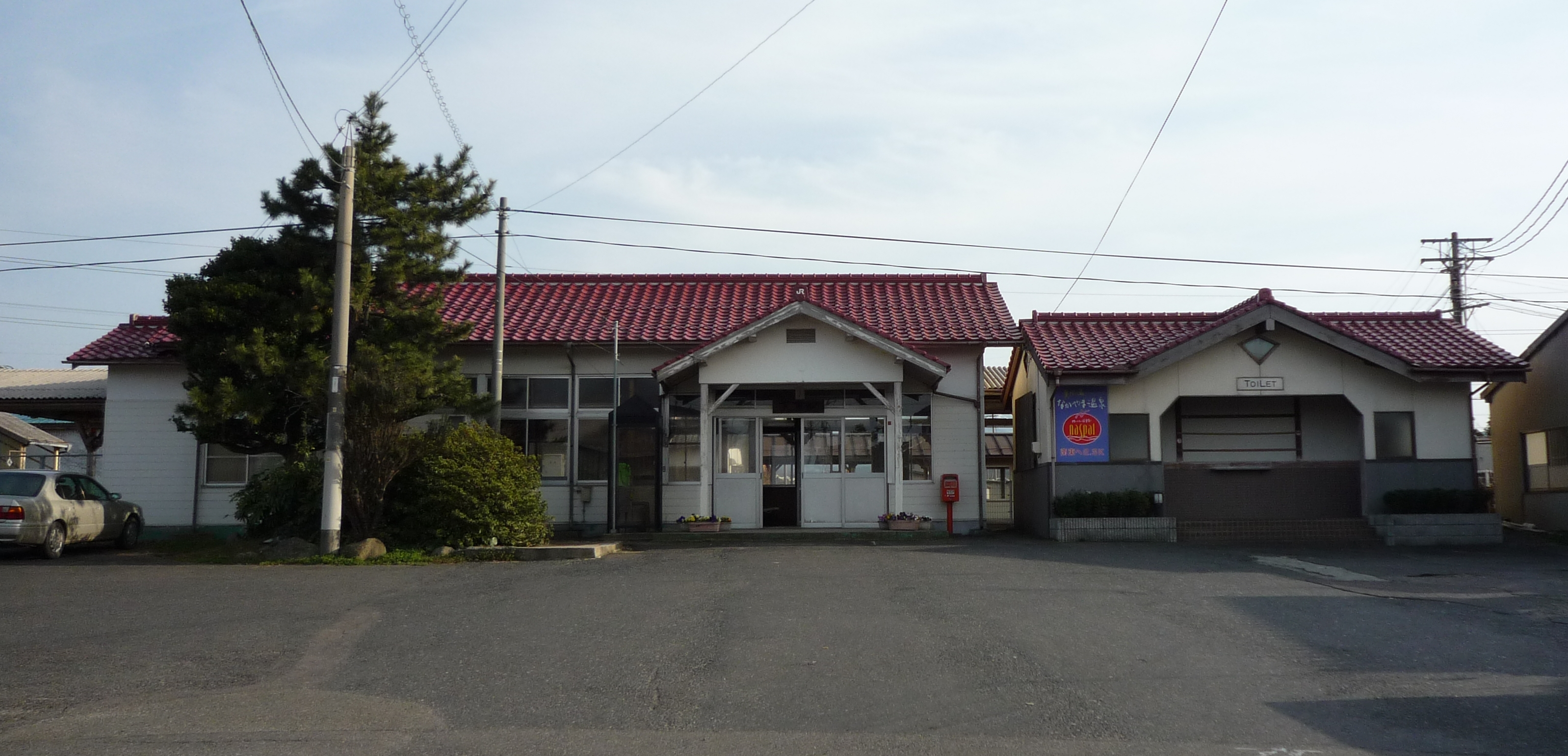
- Shimoichi Station, March 2009

General information
- Location: 300 Shimoichi, Daisen-cho, Saihaku-gun, Tottori-ken 689-3122; Japan
- Coordinates: 35°31′7.75″N 133°33′58.68″E
- Operator: JR West
- Line: San'in Main Line
- Distance: 297.7 km (185.0 miles) from Kyoto
- Platforms: 2 side platforms
- Tracks: 2

Construction
- Structure type: At grade

Other information
- Status: Unstaffed
- Website: Official website

History
- Opened: 28 August 1903

Passengers
- 2018: 170 daily

Services
Preceding station	JR West	Following station
Mikuriya towards Yonago	San'in Line Local	Nakayamaguchi towards Kinosaki-Onsen
Location
- Location within Tottori Prefecture Location within Japan

Shimoichi Station (下市駅, Shimoichi-eki) is a passenger railway station located in the town of Daisen, Tottori Prefecture, Japan. It is operated by the West Japan Railway Company (JR West).

== Lines ==
Shimoichi Station is served by the San'in Main Line, and is located 297.7 kilometers from the terminus of the line at Kyoto.

== Station layout ==
The station consists of two opposed ground-level side platform connected by a footbridge. The station is unattended.

=== Platforms ===
1	■ San'in Main Line	for Kurayoshi and Tottori
2	■ San'in Main Line	for Yonago and Matsue

== History ==
Shimoichi Station opened on August 28, 1903. With the privatization of the Japan National Railways (JNR) on April 1, 1987, the station came under the aegis of the West Japan Railway Company.

== Passenger statistics ==
In fiscal 2018, the station was used by an average of 170 passengers daily.

== Surrounding area ==
- Oyama Municipal Nakayama Junior High School
- Japan National Route 9

== See also ==
- List of railway stations in Japan
