= Nakayamaguchi Station =

Railway station located in Daisen, Tottori Prefecture, Japan

Nakayamaguchi Station 中山口駅
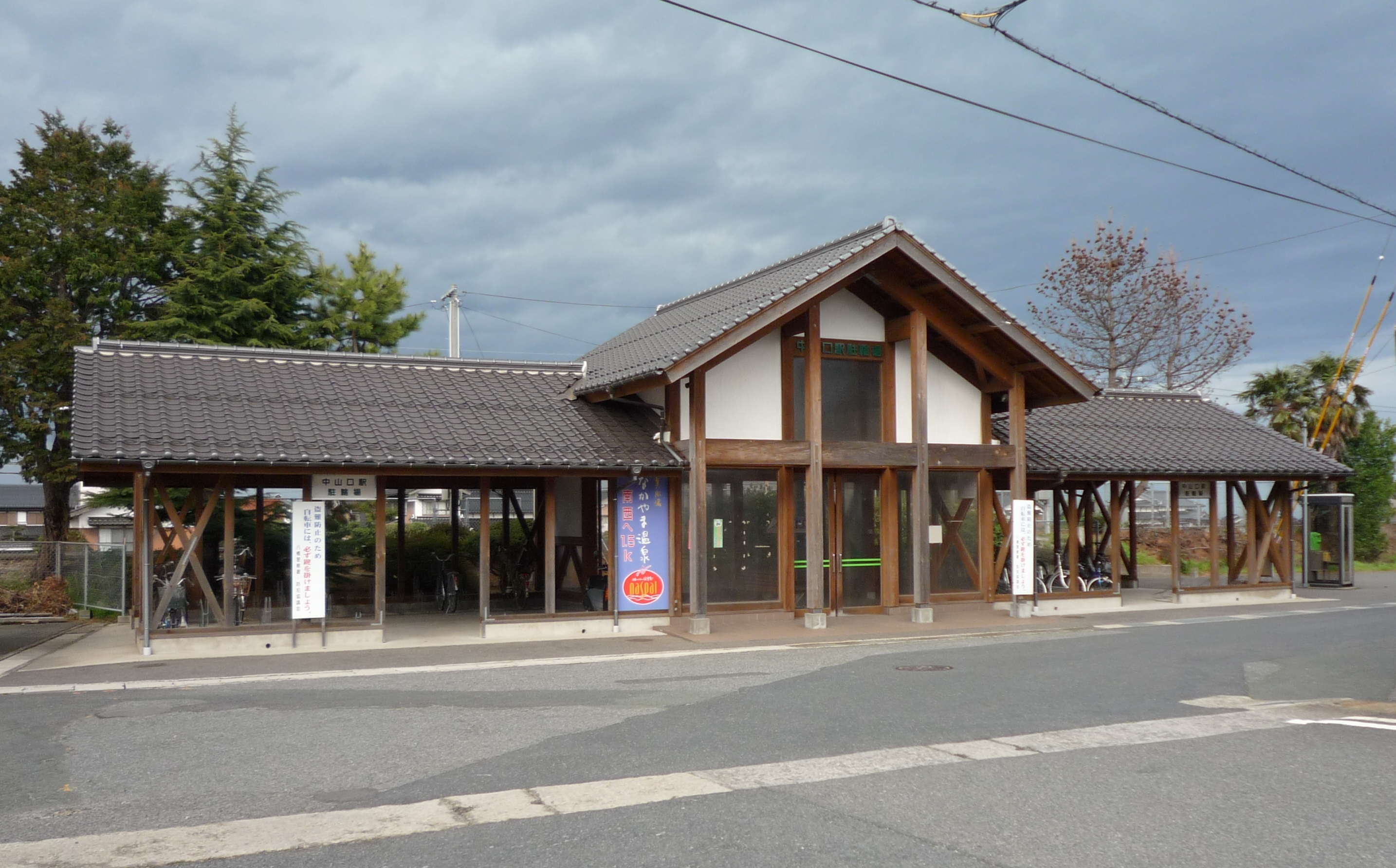
- Nakayamaguchi Station, March 2009

General information
- Location: 637 Tanaka, Daisen-cho, Saihaku-gun, Tottori-ken 689-3114; Japan
- Coordinates: 35°31′15.06″N 133°35′24.06″E
- Operator: JR West
- Line: San'in Main Line
- Distance: 295.5 km (183.6 miles) from Kyoto
- Platforms: 1 side platform
- Tracks: 1

Construction
- Structure type: At grade

Other information
- Status: Unstaffed
- Website: Official website

History
- Opened: 1 November 1951

Passengers
- 2018: 134 daily

Services
Preceding station	JR West	Following station
Shimoichi towards Yonago	San'in Line Local	Akasaki towards Kinosaki-Onsen
Location
- Location within Tottori Prefecture Location within Japan

Nakayamaguchi Station (中山口駅, Nakayamaguchi-eki) is a passenger railway station located in the town of Daisen, Tottori Prefecture, Japan. It is operated by the West Japan Railway Company (JR West).

== Lines ==
Nakayamaguchi Station is served by the San'in Main Line, and is located 295.5 kilometers from the terminus of the line at Kyoto.

== Station layout ==
The station consists of one ground-level side platform serving single bi-directional track. The station is unattended.

== History ==
Nakayamaguchi Station opened on November 1, 1951. With the privatization of the Japan National Railways (JNR) on April 1, 1987, the station came under the aegis of the West Japan Railway Company.

== Passenger statistics ==
In fiscal 2018, the station was used by an average of 134 passengers daily.

== Surrounding area ==
- Daisen Town Hall Nakayama Branch Office

== See also ==
- List of railway stations in Japan
