= Daisenguchi Station =

Railway station located in Daisen, Tottori Prefecture, Japan

Daisenguchi Station 大山口駅
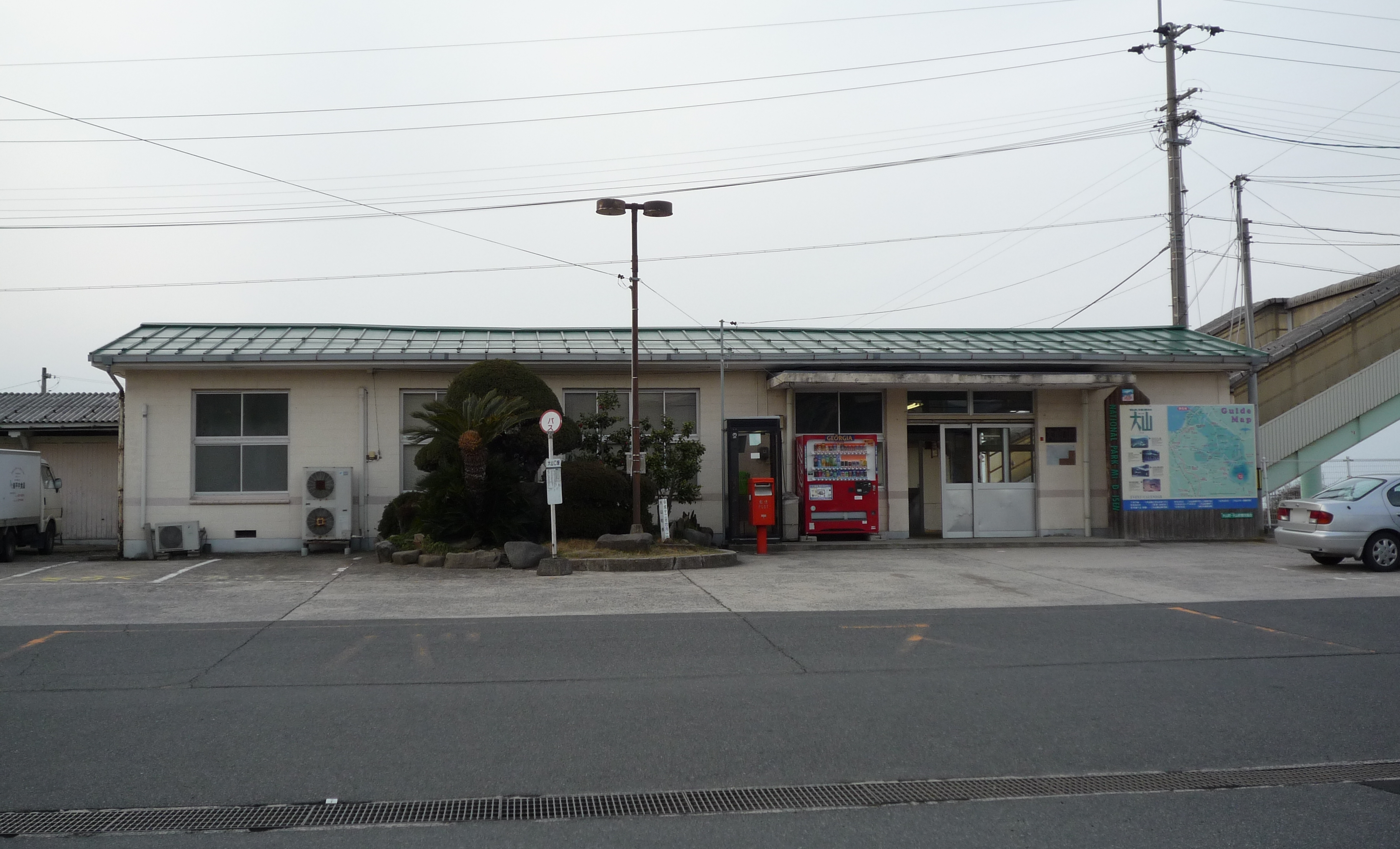
- Daisenguchi Station, March 2009

General information
- Location: 544 Kuninobu, Daisen-cho, Saihaku-gun, Tottori-ken 689-3309; Japan
- Coordinates: 35°29′5.91″N 133°27′23.85″E
- Operator: JR West
- Line: San'in Main Line
- Distance: 308.8 km (191.9 miles) from Kyoto
- Platforms: 2 side platforms
- Tracks: 2

Construction
- Structure type: At grade

Other information
- Status: Unstaffed
- Website: Official website

History
- Opened: 17 September 1926

Passengers
- 2018: 426 daily
Location
- Location within Tottori Prefecture Location within Japan

Daisenguchi Station (大山口駅, Daisenguchi-eki) is a passenger railway station located in the town of Daisen, Tottori Prefecture, Japan. It is operated by the West Japan Railway Company (JR West).

== Lines ==
Daisenguchi Station is served by the San'in Main Line, and is located 308.8 kilometers from the terminus of the line at Kyoto.

== Station layout ==
The station consists of two opposed ground-level side platform connected by a footbridge. The station is unattended.

=== Platforms ===
1	■ San'in Main Line	for Kurayoshi and Tottori
2	■ San'in Main Line	for Yonago and Matsue

== Adjacent stations ==
West Japan Railway Company (JR West)

«	Service	»
Sanin Main Line
Akasaki	Express Tottori Liner towards Tottori	Yodoe
Nawa	Local	Yodoe

== History ==
Daisenguchi Station opened on September 17, 1926. On July 28, 1945, about 600 meters east of Daisenguchi Station, a train with two carriages prominently marked with red cross markings transporting wounded and sick soldiers with attendant nurses and medics, and nine passenger carriages with 1200 civilians was strafed and rocketed by three United States Navy F6F Hellcats, resulting in 44 deaths and 33 severe injuries. This incident is marked by a commemorative monument at the station. With the privatization of the Japan National Railways (JNR) on April 1, 1987, the station came under the aegis of the West Japan Railway Company.

== Passenger statistics ==
In fiscal 2018, the station was used by an average of 426 passengers daily.

== See also ==
- List of railway stations in Japan
