= Mikuriya Station (Tottori) =

Railway station located in Daisen, Tottori Prefecture, Japan

Mikuriya Station 御来屋駅
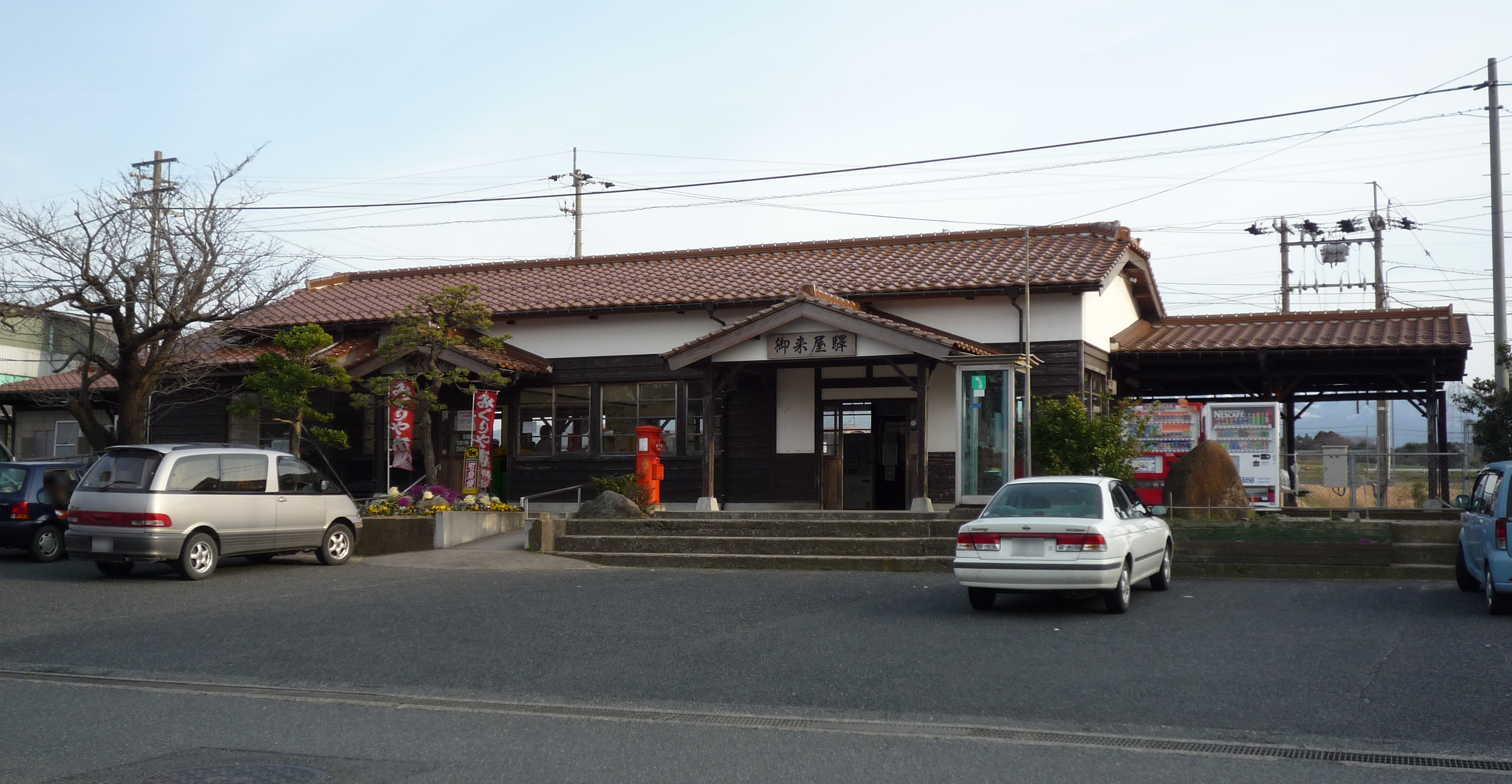
- Mikuriya Station building, March 2009

General information
- Location: 468 Nishitsubo, Daisen-cho, Saihaku-gun, Tottori-ken 689-3205; Japan
- Coordinates: 35°30′43.93″N 133°30′10.93″E
- Operator: JR West
- Line: San'in Main Line
- Distance: 303.6 km (188.6 miles) from Kyoto
- Platforms: 1 side + 1 island platform
- Tracks: 3

Construction
- Structure type: At grade

Other information
- Status: Unstaffed
- Website: Official website

History
- Opened: 1 November 1902

Passengers
- 2018: 234 daily

Services
Preceding station	JR West	Following station
Nawa towards Yonago	San'in Line Local	Shimoichi towards Kinosaki-Onsen
Location
- Location within Tottori Prefecture Location within Japan

Mikuriya Station (御来屋駅, Mikuriya-eki) is a passenger railway station located in the town of Daisen, Tottori Prefecture, Japan. It is operated by the West Japan Railway Company (JR West).

== Lines ==
Mikuriya Station is served by the San'in Main Line, and is located 303.6 kilometers from the terminus of the line at Kyoto.

== Station layout ==
The station consists of one ground-level side platform and one ground level island platform. The station building faces the side platform, which is normally used for trains in both directions and the island platform is connected by a footbridge. It is the oldest station in the San'in area continuing to use the original station building from the opening of the line in 1902. In 2002, the station building was renovated to commemorate the 100th anniversary of the San'in Railway. Inside the station building is a display with a list of parcel fares from when the train was in service, photos of steam locomotives, and a chronological chart of the history of the San'in Main Line. The space that used to be the station office is now a direct sales store for local agricultural and marine products.The station building received protection by the national government as a Registered Tangible Cultural Property in 2017.

=== Platforms ===
1	■ San'in Main Line	for Kurayoshi and Tottori for Yonago and Matsue
2, 3	■ San'in Main Line	for Yonago and Matsue

== History ==
Mikuriya Station opened on November 1, 1902. With the privatization of the Japan National Railways (JNR) on April 1, 1987, the station came under the aegis of the West Japan Railway Company.

== Passenger statistics ==
In fiscal 2018, the station was used by an average of 234 passengers daily.

== Surrounding area ==
- Daisen Town Hall
- Japan National Route 9

== See also ==
- List of railway stations in Japan
