= Nawa Station (Tottori) =

Railway station located in Daisen, Tottori Prefecture, Japan

Nawa Station 名和駅
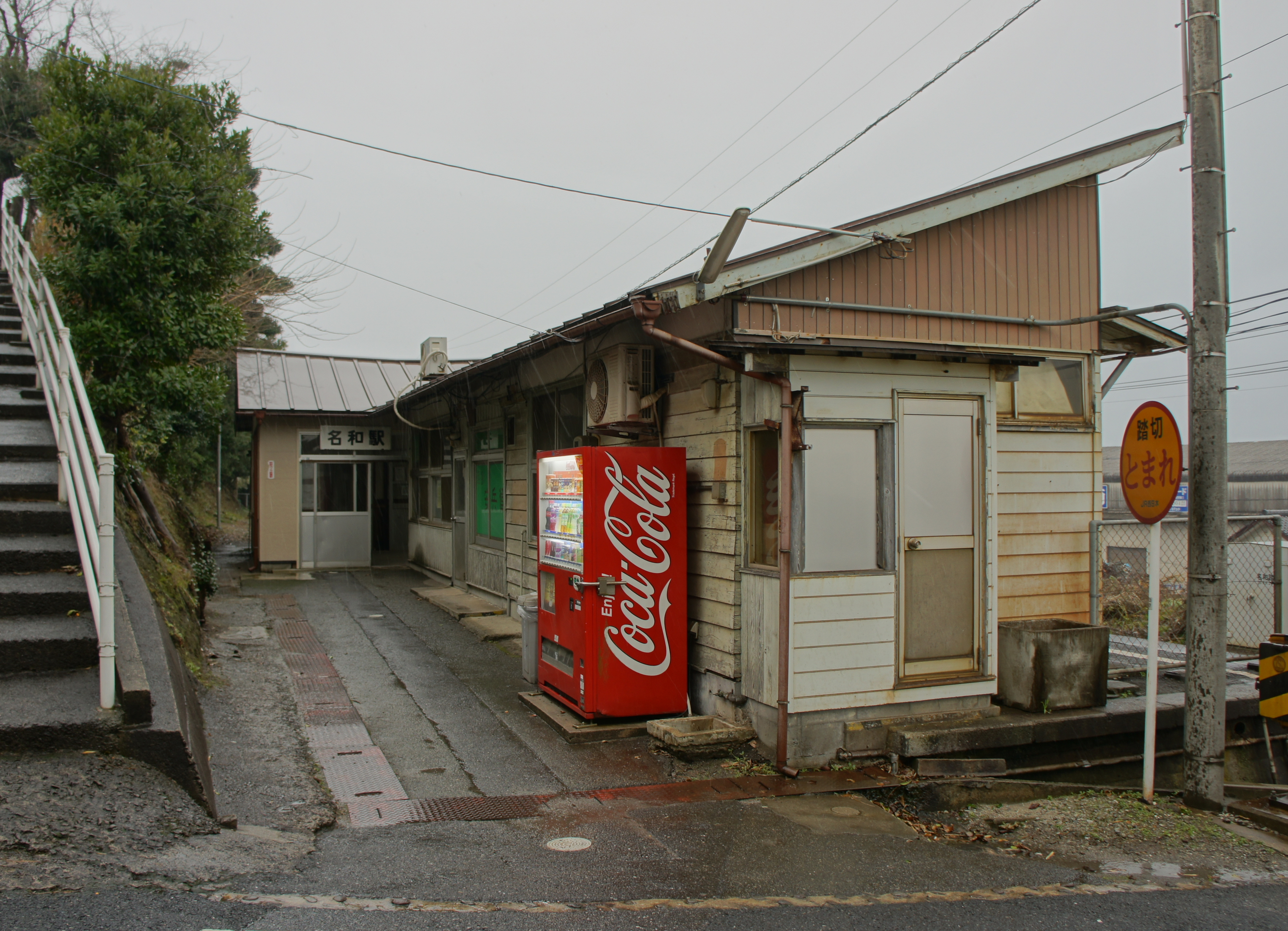
- Nawa Station, March 2009

General information
- Location: 1300 Mikuriya, Daisen-cho, Saihaku-gun, Tottori-ken 689-3211; Japan
- Coordinates: 35°30′26.45″N 133°29′30.97″E
- Operator: JR West
- Line: San'in Main Line
- Distance: 304.7 km (189.3 miles) from Kyoto
- Platforms: 1 side platform
- Tracks: 1

Construction
- Structure type: At grade

Other information
- Status: Unstaffed
- Website: Official website

History
- Opened: 11 March 1909

Passengers
- 2018: 86 daily
Location
- Location within Tottori Prefecture Location within Japan

Nawa Station (名和駅, Nawa-eki) is a passenger railway station located in the town of Daisen, Tottori Prefecture, Japan. It is operated by the West Japan Railway Company (JR West).

== Lines ==
Nawa Station is served by the San'in Main Line, and is located 304.7 kilometers from the terminus of the line at Kyoto.

== Station layout ==
The station consists of one ground-level side platform serving a single bi-directional track. The station building is on the left side facing in the direction of Yonago. The station is unattended.

== Adjacent stations ==
West Japan Railway Company (JR West)

«	Service	»
Sanin Main Line
Express Tottori Liner: Does not stop at this station
Mikuriya	Local	Daisenguchi

== History ==
Nawa Station opened on March 11, 1909, as a seasonal temporary stop. It was elevated to a full passenger station on February 10, 1955. With the privatization of the Japan National Railways (JNR) on April 1, 1987, the station came under the aegis of the West Japan Railway Company.

== Passenger statistics ==
In fiscal 2018, the station was used by an average of 86 passengers daily.

== See also ==
- List of railway stations in Japan
