= Mukibanda Yayoi remains =

Archaeological site in Yonago, Tottori, Japan

Mukibanda Yayoi Settlement Site
- 妻木晩田遺跡 (Japanese)
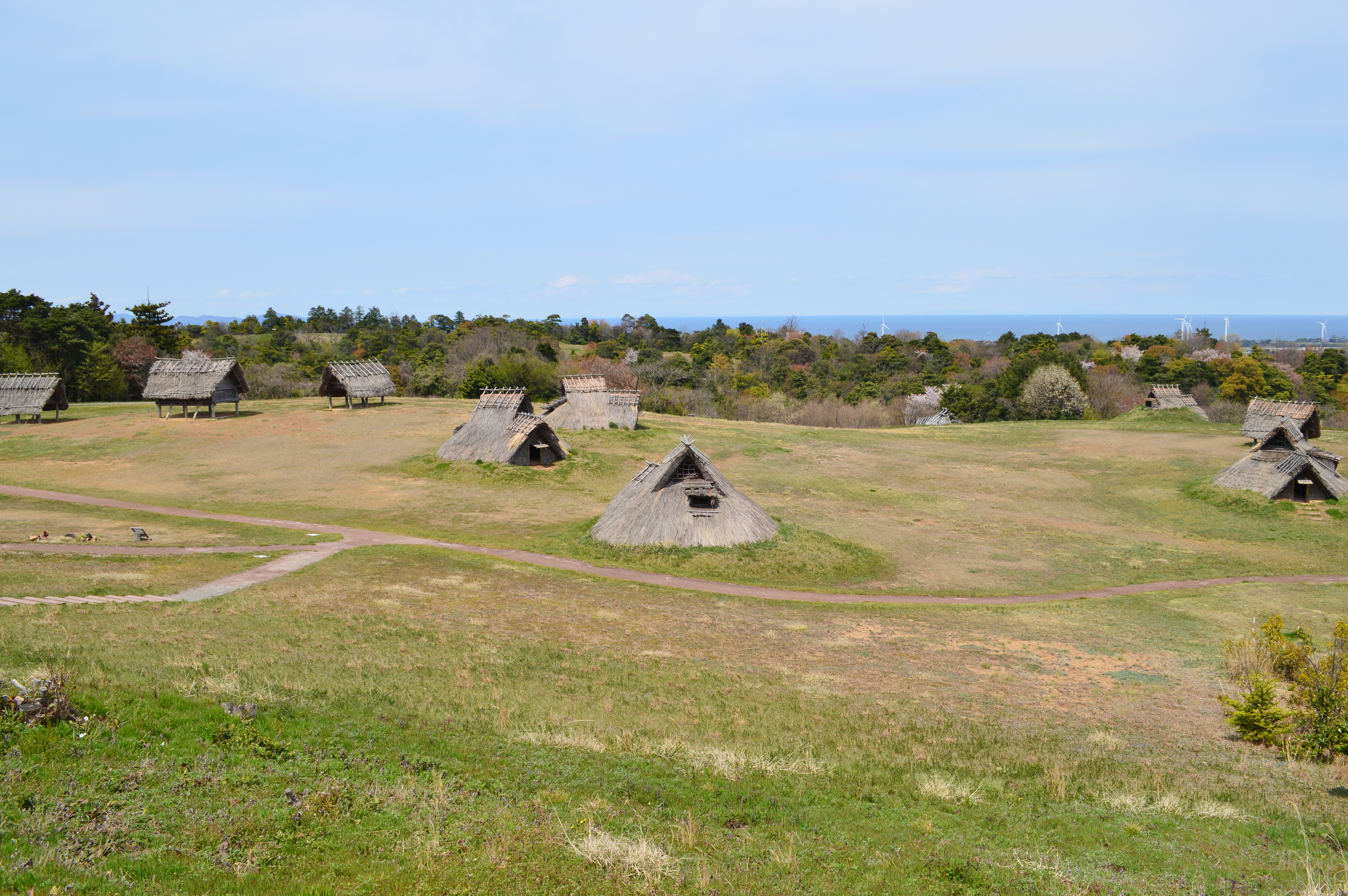
- Mukibanda Site, Mukiyama area

- Mukibanda ruins Mukibanda Yayoi remains (Japan)
- Interactive map of Mukibanda Yayoi Settlement Site
- 35°27′36″N 133°26′51″E
- Type: settlement ruins
- Periods: Yayoi period
- Location: Yonago and Daisen, Tottori Prefecture, Japan
- Region: San'in region

History
- Built: first to second centuries CE

Site notes
- Public access: Yes (museum)

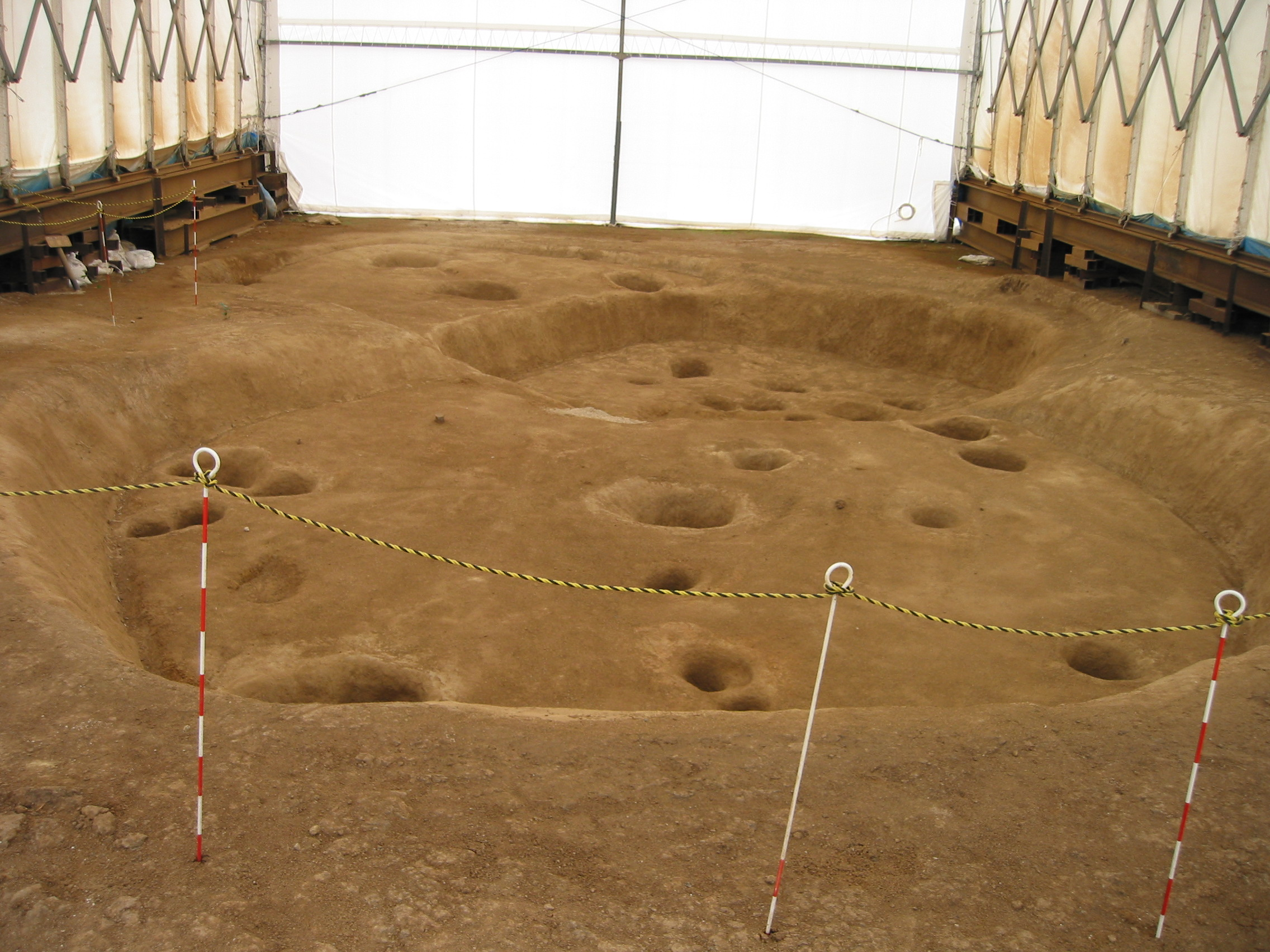
Mukibanda Yayoi Settlement Site, Mukiyami area

Mukibanda Yayoi Settlement Site (妻木晩田遺跡, Mukibanda-iseki) is an archaeological site with a large Yayoi period settlement remains, straddling the border between the municipalities of Yonago and Daisen, Tottori Prefecture in the San'in region of western Japan. The Mukibanda site was designated a National Historic Site in 1999.

== General description ==
The Mukibanda site is located in the low foothills of Mount Daisen, at an elevation of between 90 metres (300 ft) and 120 metres (390 ft) above sea level, and covers 170 hectares (420 acres). The settlement was naturally protected by the foothills of Mount Daisen, yet had close access to Miho Bay on the Sea of Japan, which is clearly visible from the site. It is divided into several discreet areas along the hill ridge. Continuing excavations have confirmed the remains of more than 395 pit dwellings, more than 500 pillar-supported buildings, and more than 30 burial mounds. It is estimated that there are more than 1,000 buildings including unexplored areas, making it one of the largest settlements in the Yayoi period.

== Discovery ==
Construction of a golf course and large-scale "Daisen Swiss Village" resort was planned on the site in the early 1990s by the Keihan Group, but after an examination of the area by the Boards of Education of Daisen and Yodoe, now Yonago City, between 1995 and 1998, a national-level conservation movement sought to protect the area from development. The ruins cover an area of 156 hectares.

=== Districts ===
The Mukibanda Yayoi remains are divided into seven districts.

- Sentani
- Muki Niiyama
- Mukiyama
- Matsuogashira
- Komaishi
- Shimizu
- Matsuojo

== Excavation ==
Roughly 1/20th of the Mukibanda remains have been excavated. The 17.2 hectares (43 acres) of excavation revealed 395 pit-style dwellings, 502 dwellings with raised cornerstones, and 24 Yayoi-style barrow cliff tombs. This area was inhabited between the late Yayoi to early Kofun period, roughly 100 BC to 300 AD. The east part of the site was occupied by dwellings, and the western part of the site, on higher ground, was used for gravesites. The settlement was active in blacksmithing, bead making, and the production of earthenware Yayoi pottery. The highest point on the site in the Matsuogashira district of Daisen appears to be the home of the chief of the village and home to the sacred area of the site. The entire site is thought to be the chief village, and possibly capitol, of some type of political entity. The Mukibanda site is likely part of ancient Kingdom of Izumo The existence of ring trenches dating from the latter half of the Yayoi period indicate that the settlement was fortified at some point, roughly corresponding to the time of the Civil War of Wa mentioned in Chinese historical sources. Remains unearthed include earthenware, stone tools (cooking tools, agricultural tools, hunting tools, weapons), ironware (agricultural tools, weapons), and broken mirrors. A total of 197 ironware items from the Yayoi period, such as hatchets, axes, chisels, drilling tools, hoe tips, sickles, and iron arrowheads, have been excavated, and some of them are of continental origin.

=== Remains ===
- Earthenware
- Stoneware, including:
  - Cookware
  - Agricultural implements
  - Hunting implements
  - Weapons
- Ironware, including:
  - Hoes
  - Spades
  - Plows
  - Sickles
  - Axes
  - Chisels
  - Awls
- Weapons
- Mirror fragments

== Visiting the site ==
The Mukibanda remains are open to the public. Tours, demonstrations, special events, and reconstructions at the site can be seen throughout the year.

=== Access ===
The Mukibanda remains are closest to the JR West San'in Main Line Yonago Station (15 minute bus ride), but is also accessible from the JR West San'in Main and Inbi lines at Tottori Station (2 hour bus ride). The site is accessible by road via the San'in Expressway, Japan National Route 431, and Japan National Route 9.

== Gallery ==
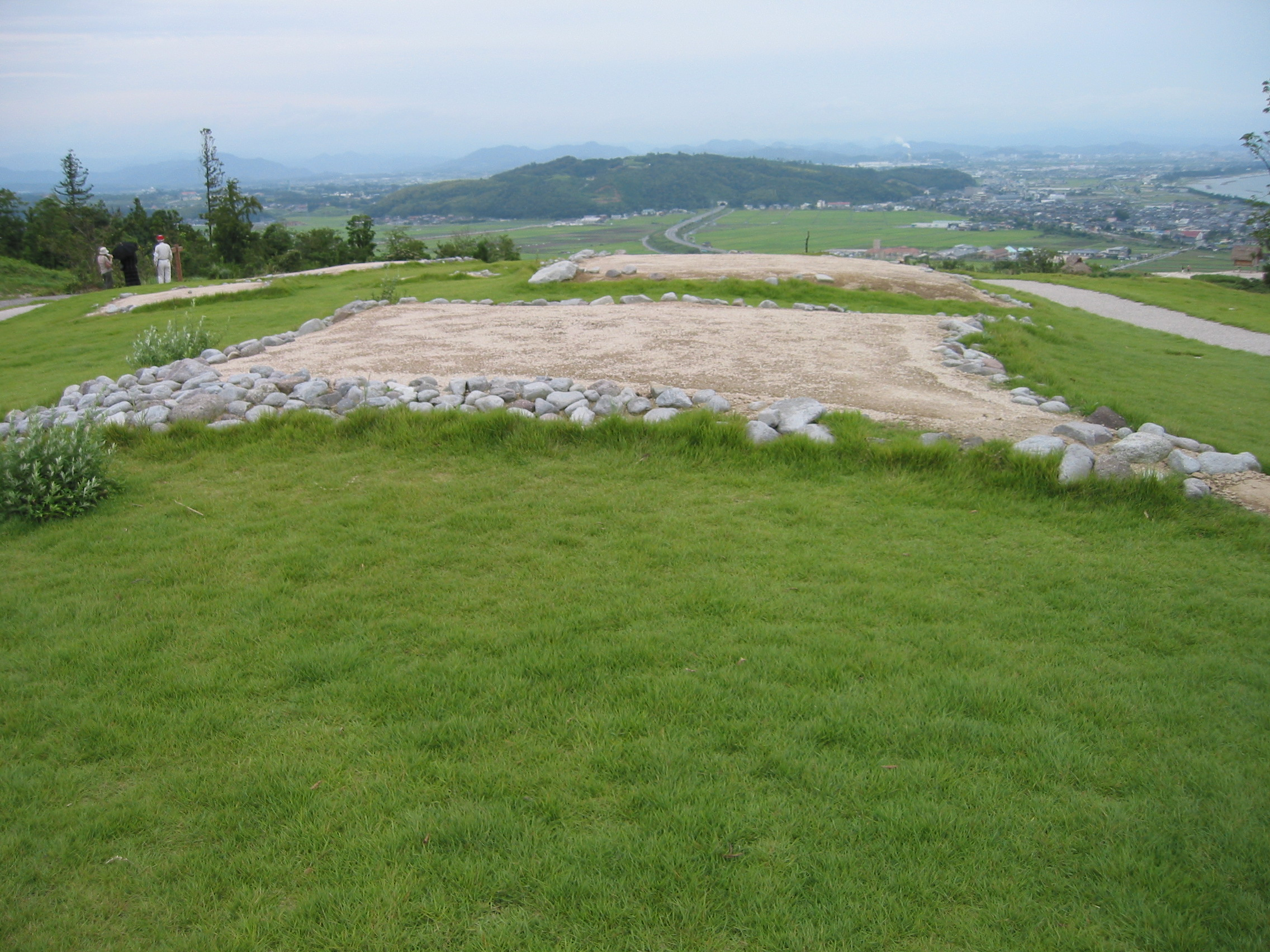
Protected grave

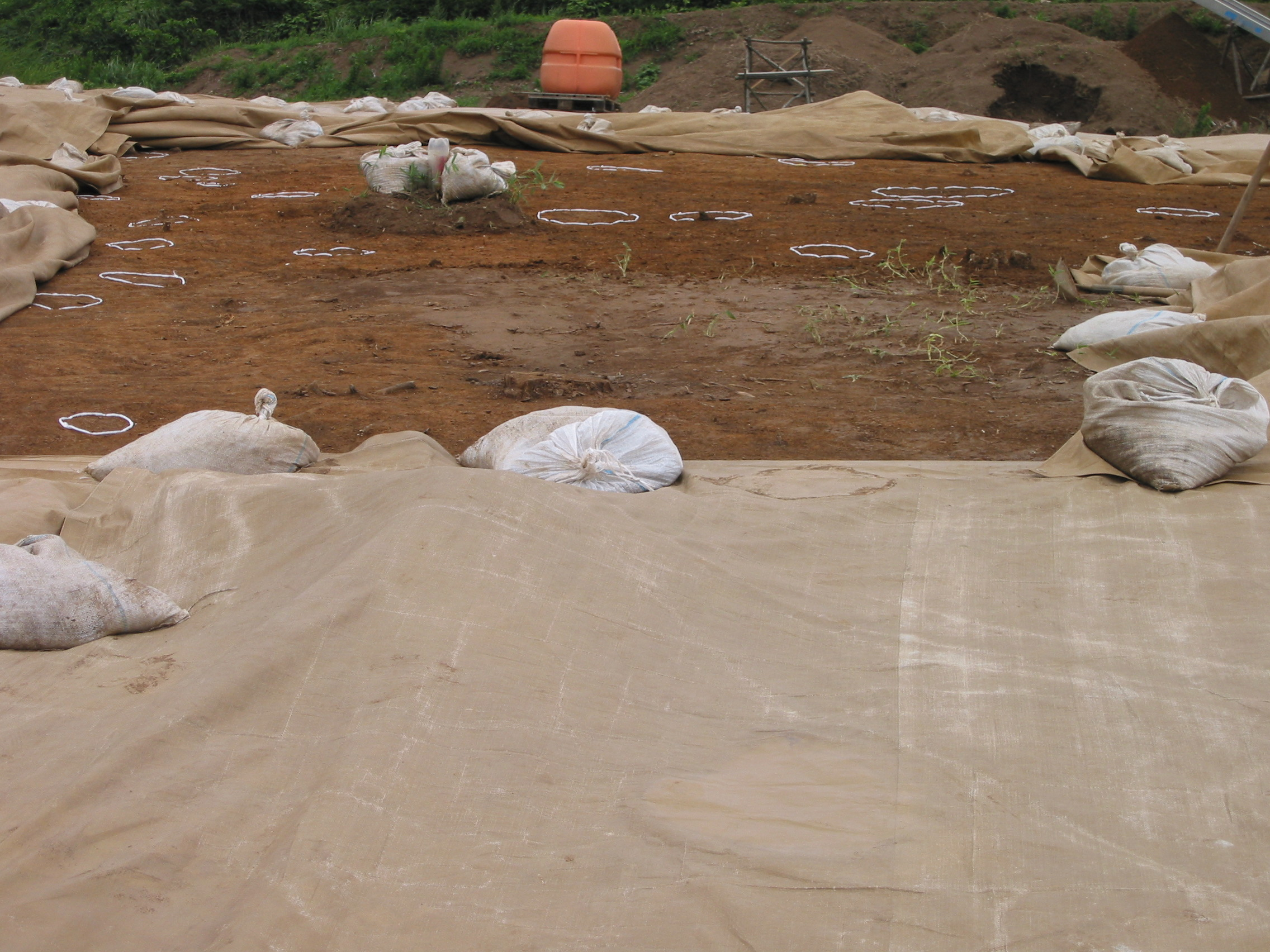
Mukiniiyama area

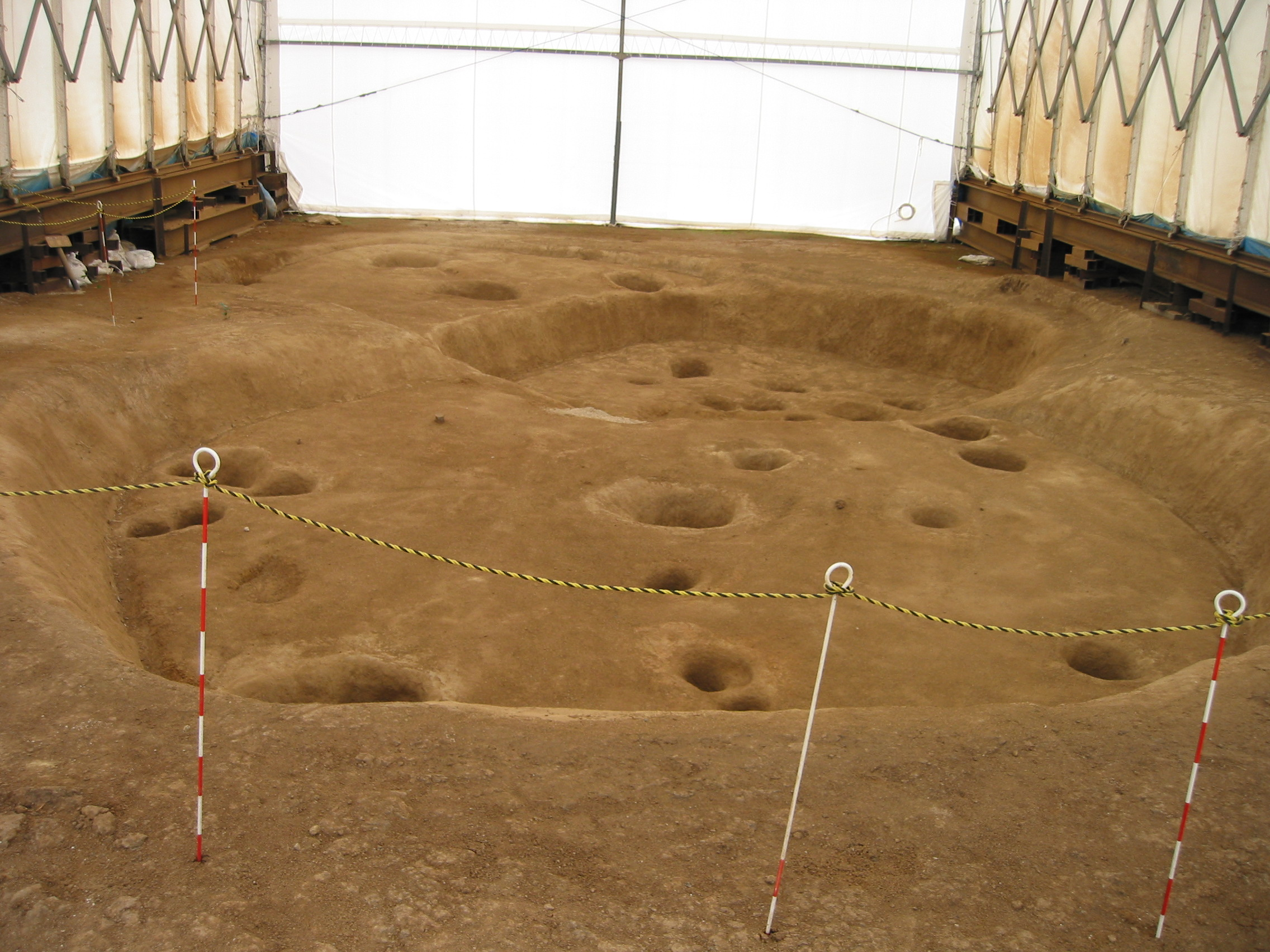
Remains of a dwelling

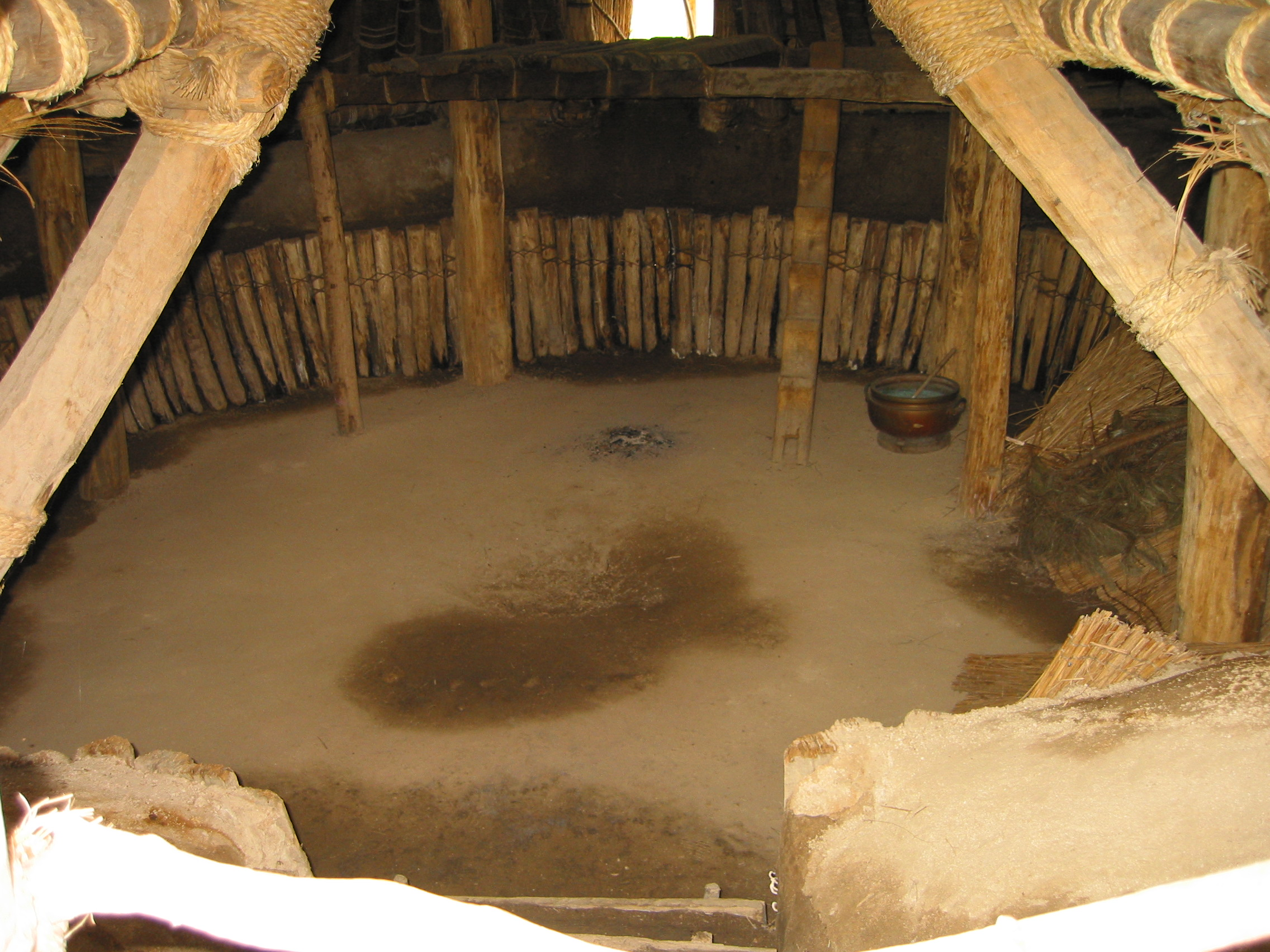
Reconstruction of a dwelling

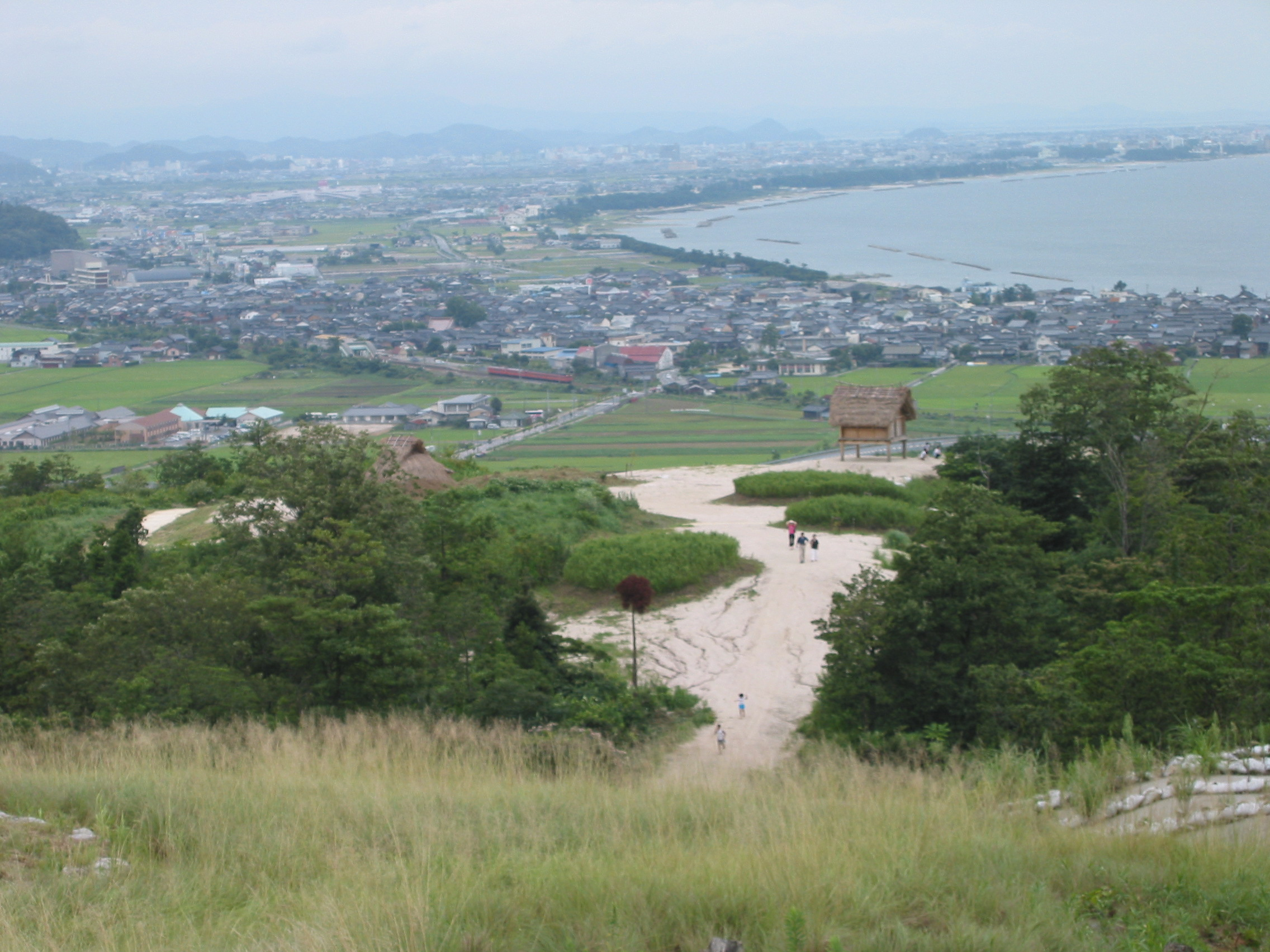
Donohara area

== See also ==
- List of Historic Sites of Japan (Tottori)
- Yayoi period
