= Yodoe Station =

Railway station in Yonago, Tottori Prefecture, Japan

Yodoe Station 淀江駅
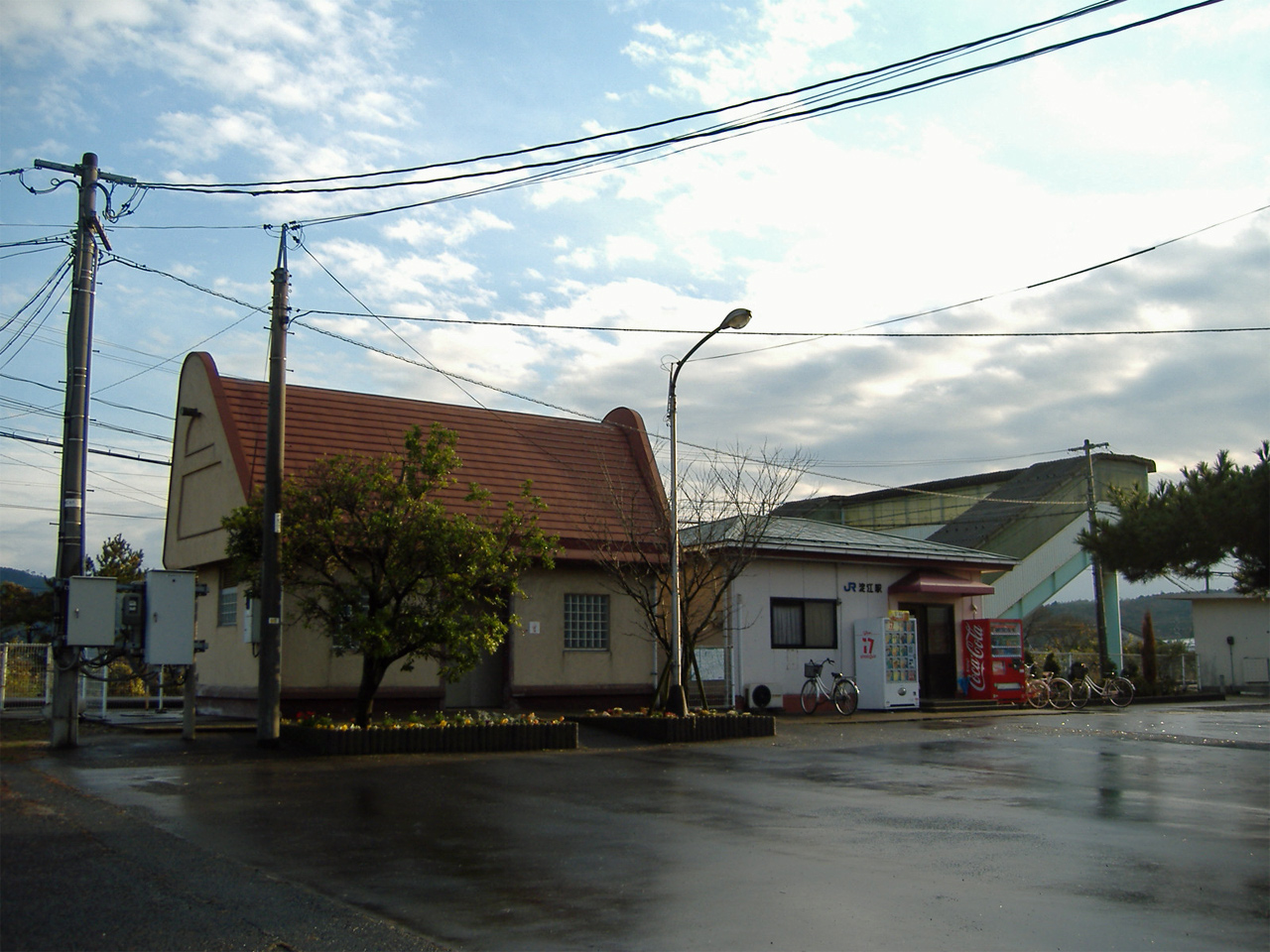
- Yodoe Station, December 2007

General information
- Location: Yodoecho Yodoe, Yonago-shi, Tottori-en 689-3402; Japan
- Coordinates: 35°27′25.18″N 133°25′46.80″E
- Operator: JR West
- Line: San'in Main Line
- Distance: 312.7 km (194.3 miles) from Kyoto
- Platforms: 2 side platforms
- Tracks: 2

Construction
- Structure type: At grade

Other information
- Status: Unstaffed
- Website: Official website

History
- Opened: 1 November 1902

Passengers
- 2018: 442 daily
Location
- Location within Tottori Prefecture Location within Japan

Yodoe Station (淀江駅, Yodoe-eki) is a passenger railway station located in the city of Yonago, Tottori Prefecture, Japan. It is operated by the West Japan Railway Company (JR West).

== Lines ==
Yodoe Station is served by the San'in Main Line, and is located 312.7 kilometers from the terminus of the line at Kyoto.

== Station layout ==
The station consists of two opposed ground-level side platforms, connected to the station building by a footbridge.The station is unattended. The station buildings built to the same design as Tomari Station on the same line.

=== Platforms ===
1	■ San'in Main Line	for Kurayoshi and Tottori
2	■ San'in Main Line	for Yonago and Matsue

== Adjacent stations ==
«	Service	»
Sanin Main Line
Express Tottori Liner: Does not stop at this station
Daisenguchi	Local	Hōki-Daisen

== History ==
Yodoe Station opened on November 1, 1902. With the privatization of the Japan National Railways (JNR) on April 1, 1987, the station came under the aegis of the West Japan Railway Company.

== Passenger statistics ==
In fiscal 2018, the station was used by an average of 442 passengers daily.

== See also ==
- List of railway stations in Japan
