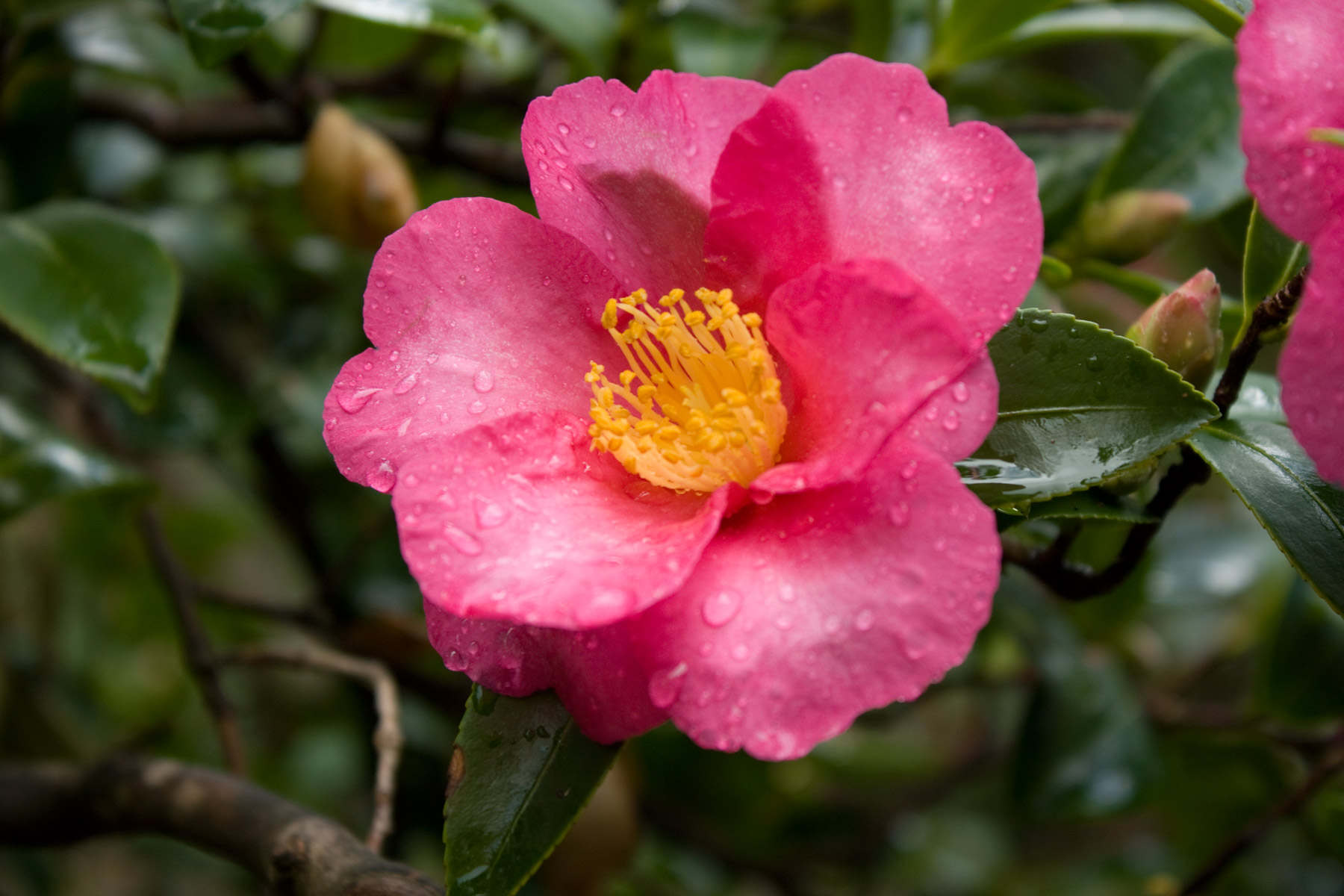
- Cultivated Camellia sasanqua

Conservation status
- Least Concern (IUCN 3.1)

Scientific classification
- Kingdom: Plantae
- Clade: Tracheophytes
- Clade: Angiosperms
- Clade: Eudicots
- Clade: Asterids
- Order: Ericales
- Family: Theaceae
- Genus: Camellia
- Section: Camellia sect. Oleifera
- Species: C. sasanqua

Binomial name
- Camellia sasanqua Thunb., 1784

Synonyms
- Thea sasanqua (Thunb.) Nois. ex Cels; Sasanqua vulgaris Nees; Sasanqua malliflora Raf.; Sasanqua odorata Raf.; Camellia miyagii (Koidz.) Makino & Nemoto; Camellia tegmentosa (Koidz.) Makino & Nemoto; Thea miyagii Koidz.; Thea tegmentosa Koidz.; Camellia sasanqua var. angustifolia Miq.; Camellia sasanqua var. lanceolata Miq.; Camellia sasanqua var. latifolia Miq.

= Camellia sasanqua =

Species of flowering plant

Camellia sasanqua, with common name Sasanqua camellia or Christmas camellia (茶梅, サザンカ), is an evergreen shrub or small tree in the genus Camellia, section Oleifera of the family Theaceae. It is native to southern Japan (Shikoku, Kyushu) and the Ryukyu Islands. It has a long cultivation history in East Asia, used both as an ornamental plant and for seed oil extraction and leaf tea.

== History ==
The scientific name of Camellia sasanqua was formally published in 1784 by Swedish botanist Carl Peter Thunberg. While serving the Dutch East India Company, he visited Japan and recorded his findings in Flora Japonica.

In Europe, true Camellia sasanqua was not introduced until 1896. Earlier, between 1811 and 1823, plants brought from China by East India Company captains and cultivated in Europe under the name C. sasanqua were actually its close relative, tea-oil camellia (C. oleifera).

In China, written records of sasanqua camellia cultivation date back to the Tang dynasty. The poet Liu Zhangqing (709–786) mentioned "Haihong" (海红, "sea red") – the ancient name for the plant – in a poem praising its ability to bloom when other flowers had faded. During the Northern Song dynasty, the poet Tao Bi (1015–1078) wrote a verse distinguishing the large-flowered Camellia japonica (shanchahua) from the smaller "Haihong", clearly referring to C. sasanqua. The Luoyang Huamu Ji (《洛阳花木记》, Record of Flowers and Trees of Luoyang, 1082) by Zhou Shihou already listed "sasanqua camellia" and "double-petalled sasanqua camellia", indicating that double-flowered cultivars existed by the late 11th century. The Quanfang Beizu (《全芳备祖》, Complete Encyclopedia of Flora), compiled by Chen Jingyi (陈景沂) in 1253, also recorded a cultivar named "Haihong". The Ming dynasty scholar Gao Lian praised the plant in his Zunsheng Bajian (《遵生八笺》, 1591), saying that without its winter blossoms the eleventh lunar month would be "a month wasted". The Qing dynasty encyclopedic work Mizhuan Huajing (《秘传花镜》, 1688) by Chen Fuyao was the first Chinese text to clearly distinguish C. sasanqua from C. japonica.

In Japan, sasanqua camellia was originally grown for oil production; cultivation as an ornamental began in the early 17th century (early Edo period). The 1695 horticultural book Kadan Chikinshō (花壇地錦抄) listed 52 cultivars. By 1974, Naoki Hakoda (箱田直紀) had compiled 320 cultivar names and confirmed 216 distinct ones.

The Japanese name sazanka (山茶花; historically sazankwa, hence the English sasanqua) derives from the Chinese shāncháhuā, 'camellia flower'. The original pronunciation was sansakwa or sanzakwa, but the n shifted rightward, perhaps to fulfil an underlying pitch accent rule that would require the second-to-last syllable to be heavy, hence sazánkwa (with the heavy zán) rather than sanzákwa (with the light zá).

== Description ==
Camellia sasanqua is an evergreen shrub or small tree, usually reaching 6 m (20 ft) in height (wild specimens can reach 10 m (33 ft)).

The leaves are alternate, leathery, elliptic to ovate, 2.6–6.3 cm (1.0–2.5 in) long and 0.9–3.2 cm (0.35–1.26 in) wide, with finely serrate margins. The upper surface is dark green and glossy, and young twigs, petioles, and midribs are covered with short pubescence.

Flowers are solitary, terminal or axillary, 5–7.6 cm (2.0–3.0 in) in diameter. Wild-type flowers have 6–7 white petals; cultivated varieties may have pink, red, or bicolored petals, sometimes more than 20.

Flowering time varies by cultivar group: early-flowering groups begin blooming from September–October, while late-flowering groups can continue until April. The fruit is a capsule, irregularly globose to pear-shaped, 1.4–2.6 cm (0.55–1.02 in) long, densely tomentose, containing 1–3 seeds per locule.

== Cultivation ==
Camellia sasanqua is adaptable to a range of light conditions, from full sun to partial shade. Compared to Camellia japonica, it exhibits greater tolerance to drought and high temperatures. During full summer sun, leaf surface temperatures may exceed 40 °C (104 °F), yet the plant continues normal growth provided that soil moisture is adequate. Most cultivars are capable of overwintering outdoors; the semi-lethal temperature for leaves is approximately −14 to −12.5 °C (6.8 to 9.5 °F). The species displays broad soil adaptability and grows well within a pH range of 5.5–7.5, although it prefers well-drained, fertile, slightly acidic sandy loam.

Propagation is achieved primarily through cuttings. Semi-hardwood cuttings taken with a heel during the rainy season and maintained under high humidity and sealed conditions yield a high success rate. Grafting onto Camellia oleifera rootstock is also practiced.

== Uses ==
The leaves can be used as a tea substitute. Oil pressed from the seeds (sasanqua camellia oil), once refined, is suitable for cooking. Because its fatty acid composition resembles that of olive oil (oleic acid content about 82%), it is often called "Oriental olive oil". Unrefined oil can be used for lighting, lubrication, soap making, and the silk industry.

The seed cake (residue after oil extraction) contains saponins and is toxic to fish. It was historically used in Hong Kong to poison fish, and in modern times is used in aquaculture to control unwanted predatory fish. The fragrant petals can be used as a raw material for perfumes.

In landscaping, sasanqua camellia can be used for hedges, ground cover, specimen trees, or street trees. Its autumn–winter flowering compensates for the scarcity of blooming plants in that season. It is also suitable for container gardening, bonsai, and cut flowers. Extracts of sasanqua camellia oil exhibit antioxidant and antimicrobial activities, including inhibitory effects against pathogens such as Escherichia coli.

== Cultivar groups ==
Based on flowering period, flower form, genetic background, and ecological habit, Naoki Hakoda divided the cultivars of Camellia sasanqua into three main groups. Chinese scholars later added a fourth group (the Oleifera Group).

- Sasanqua Group (ordinary sasanqua): closest to the wild type. Flowering from October to December, mostly single (5–11 petals), colors white, pink, red. Usually fragrant, with well-developed stamens and capable of setting seed. Representative cultivars: 'Shinonome', 'Tai-shuhai'.
- Hiemalis Group (winter sasanqua): flowering from November to March, mostly double or semi-double (15–40+ petals), colors mainly red and pink, spreading growth habit. Some are fragrant. The cultivar commonly called 'Shishigashira' or 'Kantsubaki' in Japan is correctly identified as Camellia sasanqua 'Haihong'.
- Vernalis Group (spring sasanqua): interspecific hybrids between C. sasanqua and C. japonica, scientific name Camellia × vernalis. Flowering from December to April, flower form and habit intermediate, leaves larger and with fewer hairs; mostly sterile. Representative cultivars: 'Egao', 'Yuletide'.
- Oleifera Group (tea-oil camellia group): contains genetic influence from C. oleifera, leaves large and dull, small white flowers. Representative cultivar: 'Tago-no-tsuki'.

In addition, modern hybrid cultivars such as 'Autumn Spirit' and 'Winter's Snowman' have been bred from multiple species and cultivar groups.

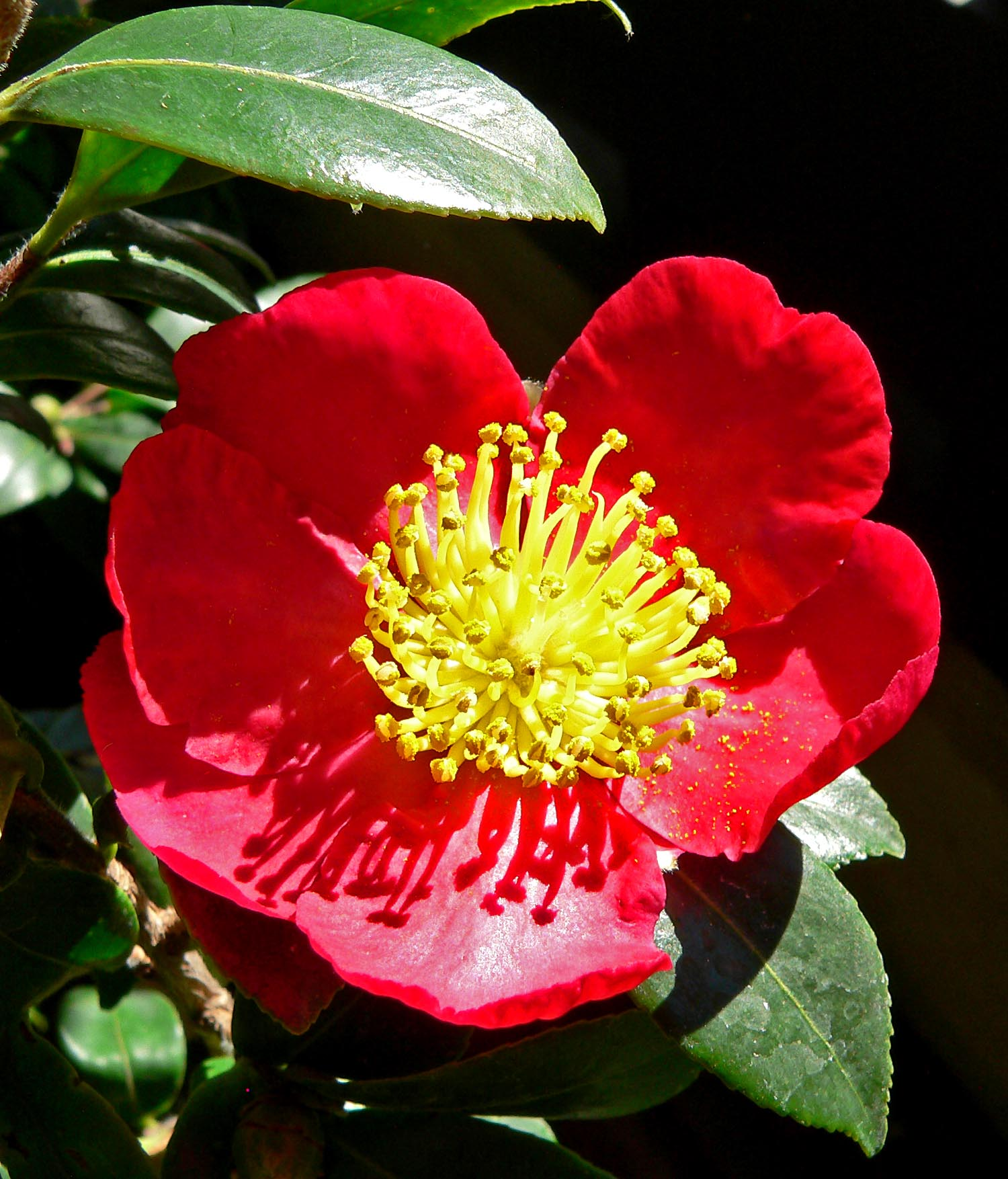
Camellia × vernalis 'Yuletide'

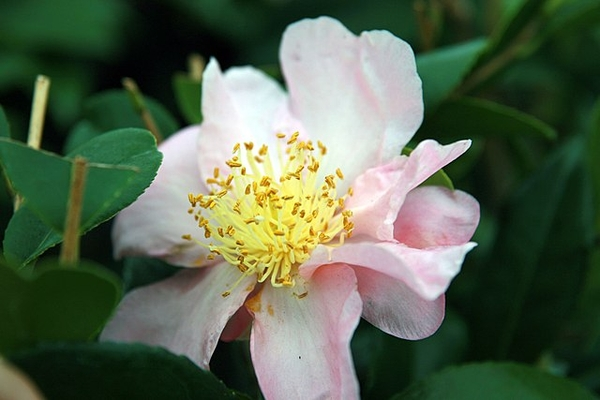
Camellia 'Winter's Star'

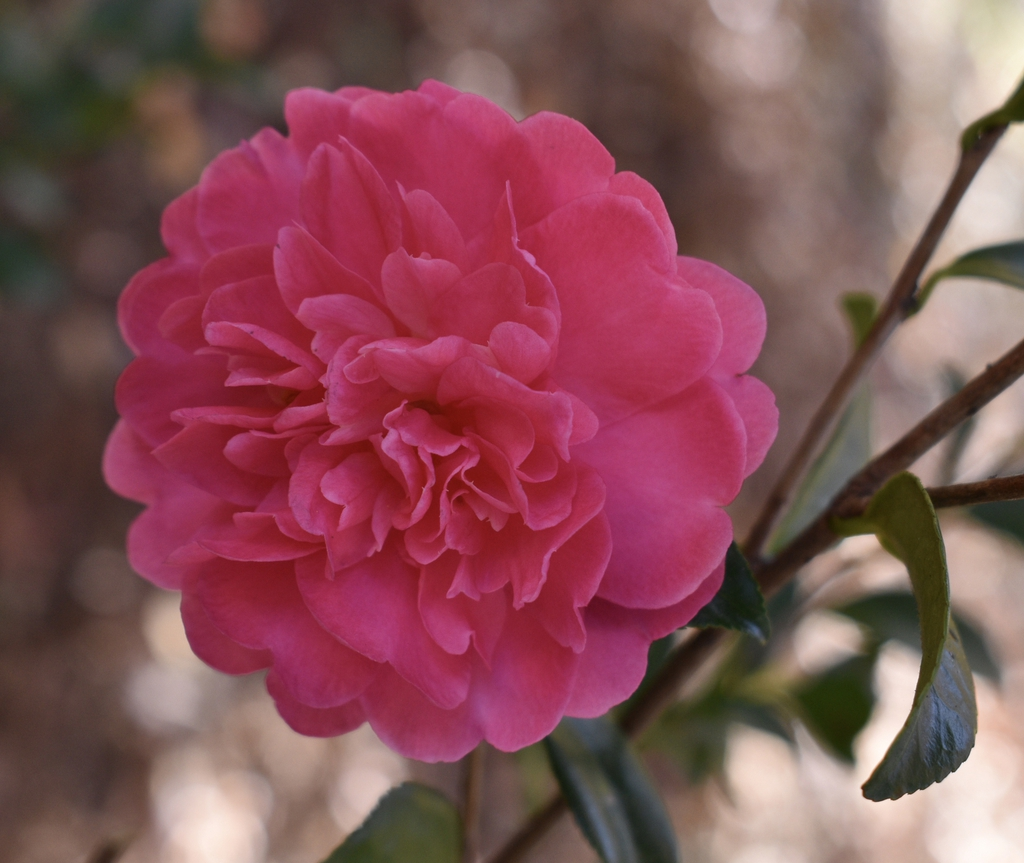
Camellia 'Autumn Spirit'

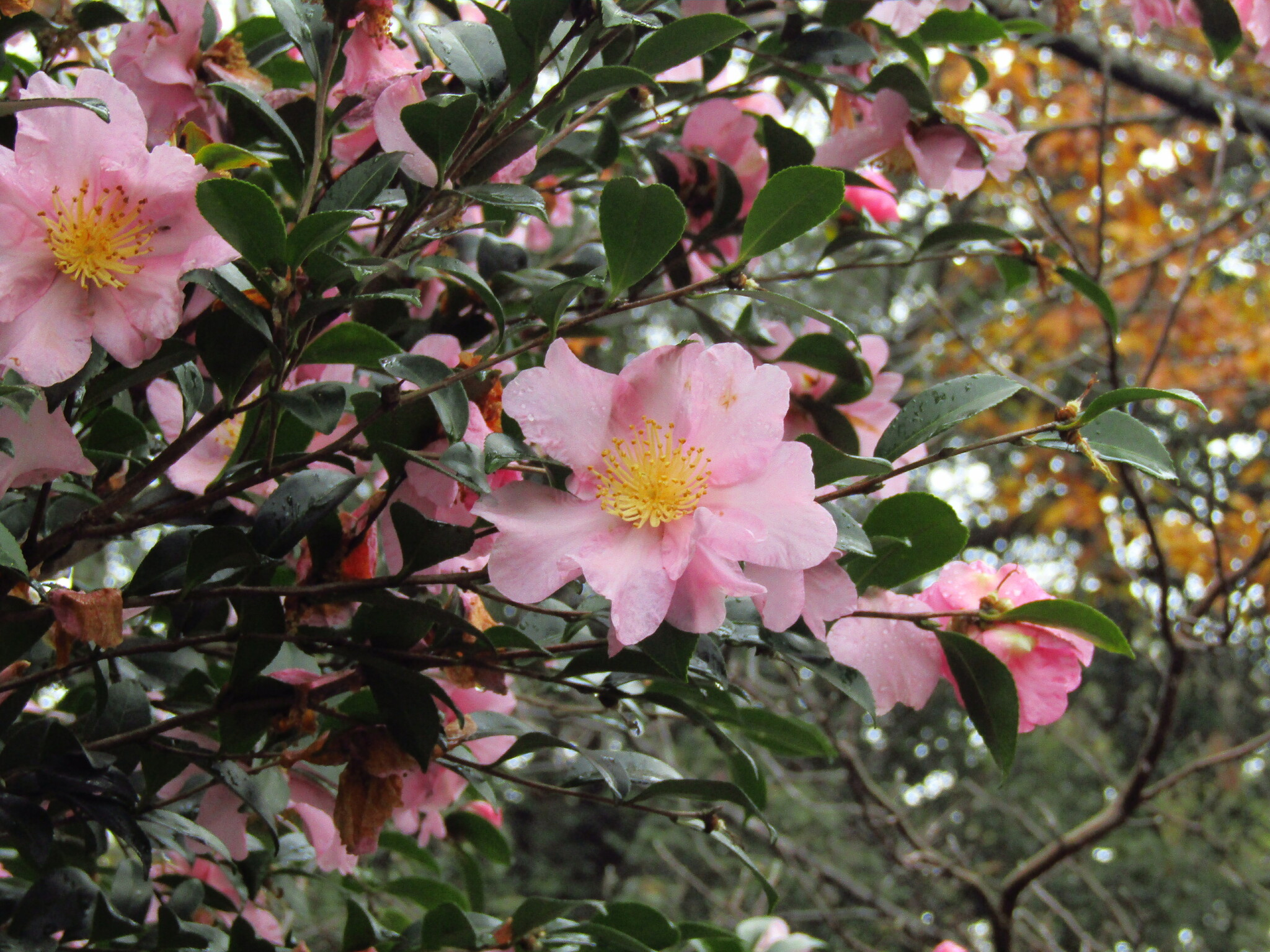
A typical C. sasanqua shrub

== Cultural significance ==
In ancient China, Camellia sasanqua was called “海红” (Hǎihóng, "sea red"). The Song dynasty poet Liu Shiheng (刘仕亨) wrote a poem titled "Ode to Sasanqua Camellia" (《咏茶梅花》) praising it. The Ming dynasty writer Gao Lian in his Zunsheng Bajian (1591) remarked: "It blooms in the eleventh month, precisely when all other flowers have withered... elegant and pure; without it, the month would be wasted." The Qing dynasty scholar Chen Fuyao in his Mizhuan Huajing (1688) explicitly distinguished sasanqua camellia from Camellia japonica, noting: "Sasanqua camellia is not a plum blossom. Because it flowers in winter, at the time when other blossoms fade, if there were no such flower to dot the landscape, the eleventh month would be nearly wasted."

In Japan, because of its autumn–winter flowering season, sasanqua camellia is widely used in gardens, hedges, and bonsai. It often appears as a seasonal motif (kigo) in Japanese tea ceremony and ikebana.

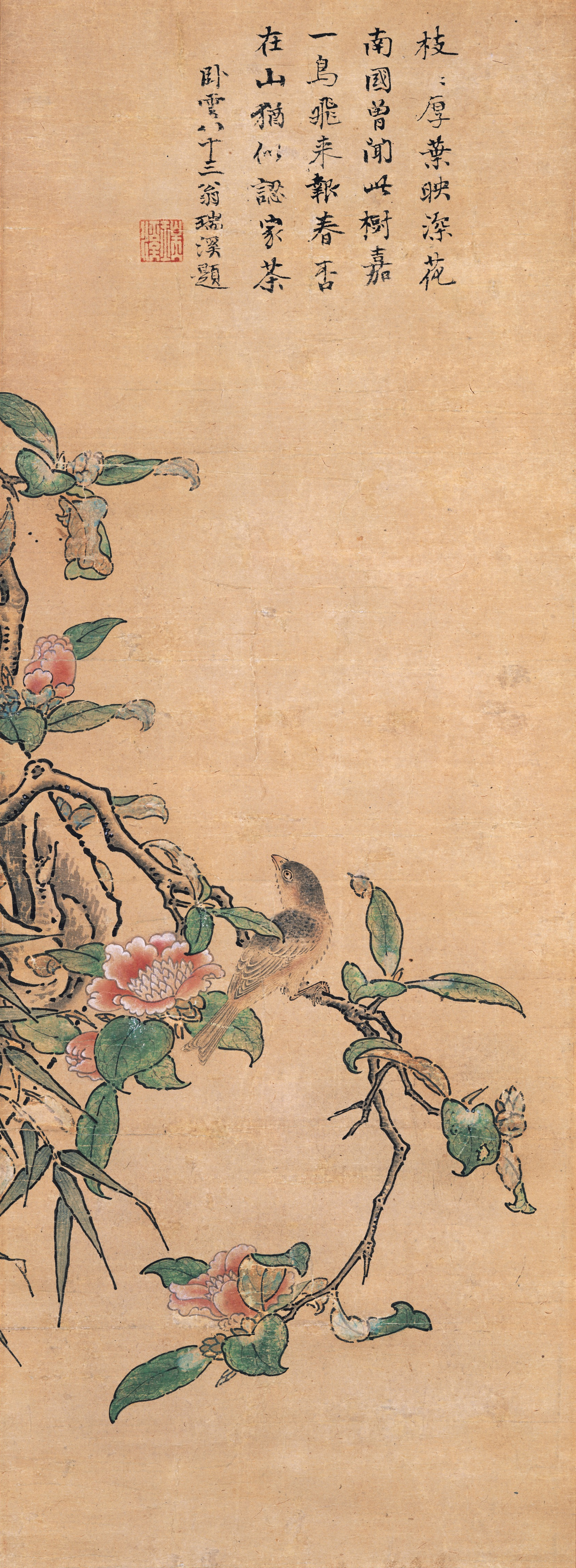
"Small Bird on a Sasanqua", ink and color on paper, Kyoto National Museum

== Conservation status ==
The natural range of Camellia sasanqua is limited to southern Japan and the Ryukyu Islands, but its distribution is relatively wide (extent of occurrence approx. 308,000 km^{2} (119,000 sq mi)), and there are no significant threats to the species. In 2015, the IUCN Red List assessed it as Least Concern under version 3.1 criteria.

The species has been introduced to many regions of the world (including South Korea, Arkansas (USA), Laos, and Vietnam), and living germplasm is maintained in numerous botanical gardens.
