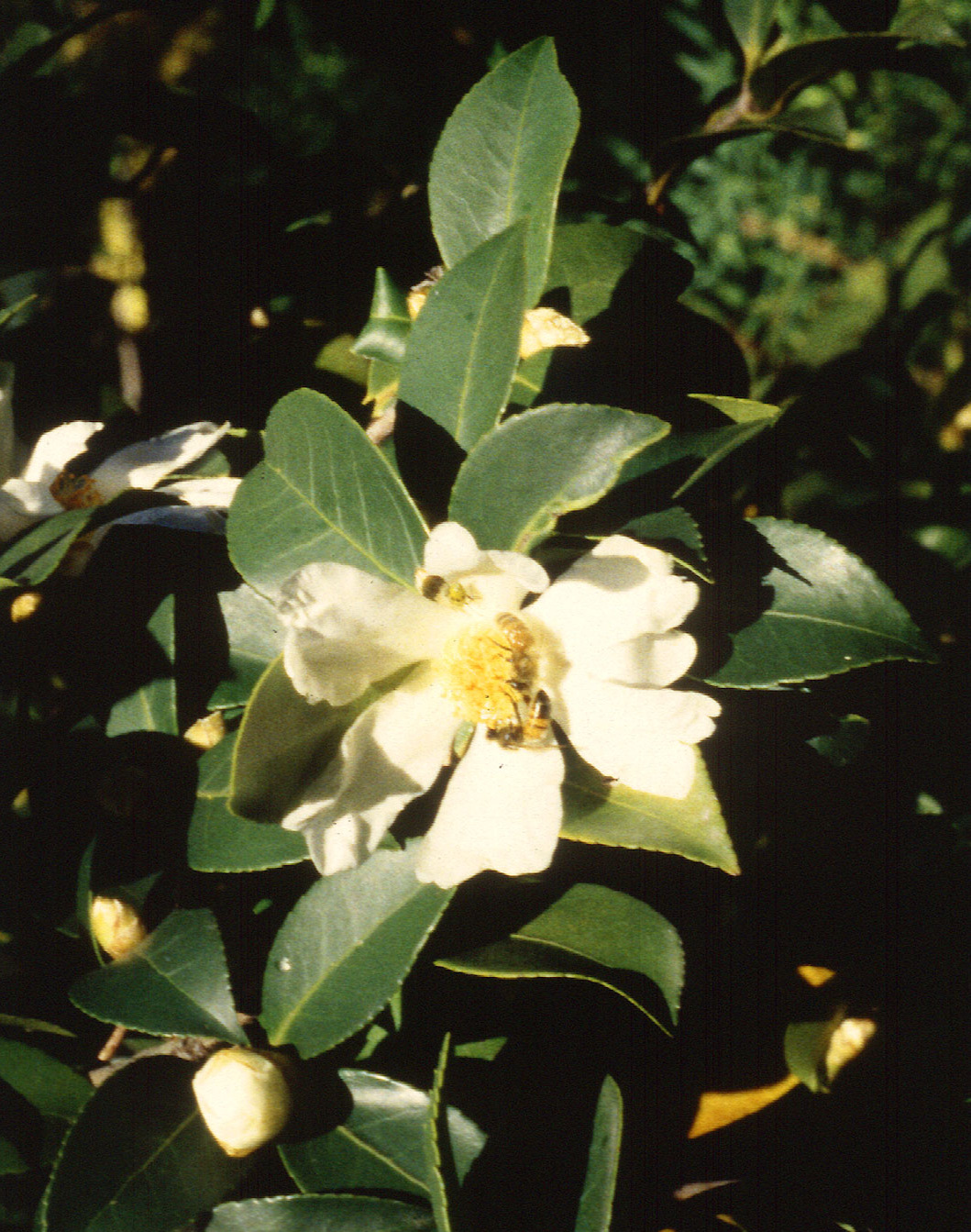

Conservation status
- Least Concern (IUCN 3.1)

Scientific classification
- Kingdom: Plantae
- Clade: Tracheophytes
- Clade: Angiosperms
- Clade: Eudicots
- Clade: Asterids
- Order: Ericales
- Family: Theaceae
- Genus: Camellia
- Species: C. oleifera

Binomial name
- Camellia oleifera C.Abel

= Camellia oleifera =

Oil-seed camellia

Species of flowering plant

Camellia oleifera, which originated in China, is notable as an important source of edible oil (known as tea oil or camellia oil) obtained from its seeds. It is commonly known as the oil-seed camellia or tea oil camellia, though to a lesser extent other species of camellia are used in oil production too.

It is widely distributed in China and is cultivated extensively there. It is found in forests, thickets, banks of streams and foothills at elevations of 500 to 1,300 metres.

This species looks much similar to Camellia sasanqua except the dark green, evergreen leaves are a bit larger, three to five inches long and two to three inches wide. Single, white, fragrant flowers are produced in mid to late fall, and this large shrub or small tree will reach a height of 20 feet with thin, upright, multiple trunks and branches. The crown forms a rounded or oval vase with lower branches removed.

== Uses ==
The seeds of Camellia oleifera can be pressed to yield tea seed oil, a sweetish seasoning and cooking oil. In tea seed oil, oleic acid, a monounsaturated fatty acid comprises ~80% of the total fatty acid content - the oil is similar in composition to olive oil. After the tea seed oil is extracted, the seed itself still serves a purpose. The Camellia oil cake is used as an anti-inflammatory and antioxidant.

Tea oil is also known as "tea seed oil" when sold as cooking oil in supermarkets throughout Australia, New Zealand and the United States.

It can also be used in textile manufacture, in soap making and, when burned in an oil lamp, as a source of light. Camellia oil is also traditionally used to protect Japanese woodworking tools and cutlery from corrosion and is currently sold for that purpose.

== See also ==
- Tea tree oil is derived from Melaleuca alternifolia - it is an essential oil used for medical and cosmetic purposes and is toxic when ingested.
- Tea tree is a name sometimes applied to a number of different species of plants endemic to Australia. These plants are unrelated to the tea plant.
