= Gao Lian =

Gao Lian may refer to:

- Gao Lian (writer), 16th Century Chinese writer, dramatist and encyclopedist
- Gao Lian (Water Margin), a Water Margin character
