= Shin-Kamigotō =

Shin-Kamigotō 新上五島町
- Town
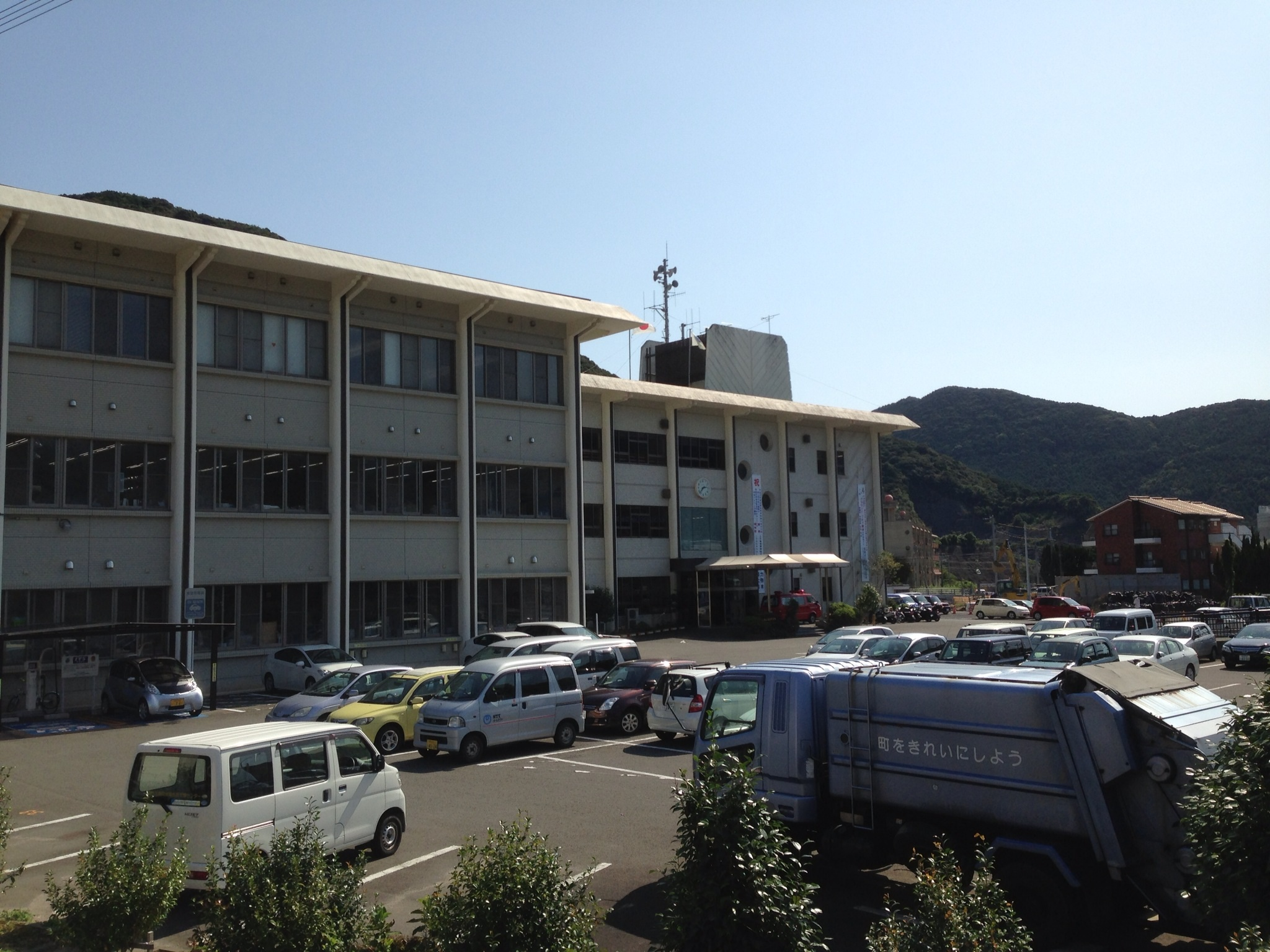
- Shin-Kamigotō Town Office

- Flag Seal

- Location of Shin-Kamigotō in Nagasaki Prefecture

- Location in Japan
- Coordinates: 32°59′4″N 129°4′24″E
- Country: Japan
- Region: Kyushu
- Prefecture: Nagasaki Prefecture
- District: Minami-Matsuura

Area
  - Total: 214.00 km^{2} (82.63 sq mi)

Population (December 1, 2025)
  - Total: 15,250
  - Density: 71.3/km^{2} (185/sq mi)
- Time zone: UTC+09:00 (JST)
- Climate: Cfa
- Website: official.shinkamigoto.net
- Symbols
- Bird: Japanese white-eye
- Flower: Camellia
- Tree: Camellia

Shin-Kamigotō (新上五島町, Shin-Kamigotō-chō) is a town located in Minami-Matsuura District, Nagasaki Prefecture, Japan, encompassing the islands of Nakadori, Wakamatsu and other surrounding islands.It was the headquarters of the Aokata Family, part of the Matsuura clan, who recorded the "Aokata Documents".

== History ==
The town was established on August 1, 2004, after the merger of the towns of Arikawa, Kamigotō, Narao, Shin-Uonome and Wakamatsu, all from Minami-Matsuura District. Following this merger, it became the only municipality in the Minami-Matsuura District.

== Location ==
Shin-Kamigotō occupies the two main islands of Nakadōri and Wakamatsu, which are connected by the Oohashi ("Wakamatsu Great Bridge", built 1991) via the small, unpopulated islet of Kaminakajima (上中島), as well as several smaller islands, including the populated islands of Arifuku, Hinoshima, Ryōzegaura, Kashiragashima, and Kirinoko.

Wakamatsu Island is connected at its northwestern extremity to Ryōzegaura Island by the Ryōzegaura Bridge, and Ryōzegaura Island is further linked with the islands of Arifuku and Hinoshima by breakwaters that allow traffic of automobiles.

Kashiragashima Oohashi (built 1981) connects the eastern end of the main island of Nakadōri with Kashiragashima, on which the famous Kashiragashima Church and the defunct Kamigotō Airport are located.

== Etymology ==
The islands that comprise the territory of Shin-Kamigotō Town form the northeastern half of the Gotō Islands archipelago, which is the origin of the name Kamigotō (literally, "Upper Five Islands"), in which Gotō ("Five Islands") is the name of the entire archipelago, and Kami- ("Upper") refers to the fact that this half of the archipelago is located closer to the Japanese capital relative to the southwestern half.

The prefix Shin- (新) at the beginning of the town's name means "new," so its full name may be translated literally to English as "New Upper Five Islands Town," though the name may be interpreted to refer to the town as a new and expanded version of the former Kamigotō Town, which was centered on the port of Aokata on the western side of the middle of Nakadōri Island.

== Climate ==
Shin-Kamigotō has the typical humid subtropical climate (Köppen Cfa) of Kyūshū, characterized by mild winters and long, hot, and humid summers. The average annual temperature in Shin-Kamigotō is 17.1 °C (62.8 °F). The average annual rainfall is 2,192.3 mm (86.31 in) with July as the wettest month. The temperatures are highest on average in August, at around 27.4 °C (81.3 °F), and lowest in January, at around 7.7 °C (45.9 °F). Its record high is 36.5 °C (97.7 °F), reached on 27 July 2026, and its record low is −4.7 °C (23.5 °F), reached on 23 January 1981.

Climate data for Arikawa, Shin-Kamigotō (1991−2020 normals, extremes 1977−present)
Month	Jan	Feb	Mar	Apr	May	Jun	Jul	Aug	Sep	Oct	Nov	Dec	Year
Record high °C (°F)	20.4 (68.7)	23.3 (73.9)	23.8 (74.8)	28.5 (83.3)	29.0 (84.2)	33.3 (91.9)	36.5 (97.7)	36.4 (97.5)	33.7 (92.7)	31.6 (88.9)	27.0 (80.6)	24.2 (75.6)	36.5 (97.7)
Mean daily maximum °C (°F)	10.5 (50.9)	11.5 (52.7)	14.5 (58.1)	18.8 (65.8)	22.7 (72.9)	25.5 (77.9)	29.7 (85.5)	31.0 (87.8)	27.5 (81.5)	23.2 (73.8)	18.3 (64.9)	13.1 (55.6)	20.5 (68.9)
Daily mean °C (°F)	7.7 (45.9)	8.3 (46.9)	11.0 (51.8)	14.9 (58.8)	18.8 (65.8)	22.1 (71.8)	26.4 (79.5)	27.4 (81.3)	24.3 (75.7)	19.8 (67.6)	14.8 (58.6)	9.9 (49.8)	17.1 (62.8)
Mean daily minimum °C (°F)	4.6 (40.3)	4.8 (40.6)	7.2 (45.0)	10.9 (51.6)	15.0 (59.0)	19.2 (66.6)	23.9 (75.0)	24.6 (76.3)	21.5 (70.7)	16.5 (61.7)	11.1 (52.0)	6.5 (43.7)	13.8 (56.9)
Record low °C (°F)	−4.7 (23.5)	−4.5 (23.9)	−2.4 (27.7)	−0.1 (31.8)	5.8 (42.4)	9.6 (49.3)	15.5 (59.9)	17.2 (63.0)	13.1 (55.6)	4.2 (39.6)	2.3 (36.1)	−2.9 (26.8)	−4.7 (23.5)
Average precipitation mm (inches)	83.2 (3.28)	100.1 (3.94)	147.6 (5.81)	196.9 (7.75)	199.0 (7.83)	306.0 (12.05)	316.3 (12.45)	251.3 (9.89)	242.1 (9.53)	121.8 (4.80)	118.6 (4.67)	85.1 (3.35)	2,192.3 (86.31)
Average precipitation days (≥ 1.0 mm)	9.4	9.0	10.7	9.6	9.4	12.2	11.4	10.3	9.5	6.8	8.3	9.0	115.6
Mean monthly sunshine hours	77.8	108.0	152.8	179.5	190.9	126.9	162.5	195.4	160.9	170.8	121.5	85.8	1,734.5
Source: Japan Meteorological Agency

== Population ==
As of December 1, 2025, the town has an estimated population of 15,250 and a density of 71.3 persons per km^{2}. The total area is 214.00 km^{2}.

Population distribution by age (2005)	Population distribution by gender (2005)
Shinkamigotō	Female
Japan	Male

=== Changes in population ===
Approximately 25% of the island's population identifies as Christian.

Year	Population
1970	46,762
1975	40,867
1980	38,140
1985	36,005
1990	32,123
1995	29,845
2000	27,559
2005	25,039
2010	22,074
2015	19,718
2020	17,503

== History ==
In the Middle Ages, this area was ruled by the Aokata Clan, which was part of an alliance of samurai bands known as the Matsumuratō. This clan wrote the Aokata Bunsho, a record of the area's history from the Kamakura to Muromachi period.

The town flourished during the Heian period as a trading hub with continental Asia during the Japanese missions to Tang China, during which it served as a port of call.

During the period of the oppression of Christians in Japan, the island served as a shelter for hidden Christians to continue practicing their faith in secret.

== Timeline ==
1981- Kamigoto Airport opened in the former Arikawa Town.

2006- Kamigoto Airport was closed.

2009- Passport services were transferred from Nagasaki Prefecture to Shinkamigoto Town. As a result, passport applications and collections became available at the Shinkamigoto Town Hall(main office)

== Place Names ==
The suffix "郷" (pronounced "go") attached to each place name refers to a traditional designation. Shinkamigoto Town's place names follow those of the former towns, and most areas retain the same names from before the large municipal mergers in the Showa era. However, both Arikawa Town and Wakamatsu Town had a place called "Kounoura-go" (神ノ浦郷). After the merger, to distinguish between the two, the former Arikawa Town area became "Higashi Kounoura-go" (東神ノ浦郷), and the former Wakamatsu Town area became "Nishi Kounoura-go" (西神ノ浦郷).

In addition to the place names with "go" used in addresses, administrative divisions are also listed, showing the affiliation with respective community associations (自治会), which are used as administrative units.

== Changes in administrative divisions ==
1871 – With the abolition of the feudal system, Fukue Prefecture was established, later merged into Nagasaki Prefecture.

1878, October 28 – The implementation of the Municipal System Law in Nagasaki Prefecture led to the formation of Minamimatsuura District, including Fukue Village and 17 other villages.

1885 – Part of Wakamatsu Village (including Michidoi-go, Inose-do-go, Tsuzuki-hama-no-ura-go, Mika-no-ura-go, and Imazato-go) was separated to form Hamano-ura Village.

1886 – Part of Uonome Village (including Kogushi-go, Tategushi-go, and Tsuwazaki-go) and part of Aokata Village (including Sone-go) were separated to form Kita-Uonome Village.

1889, April 1 – The village system was implemented, and the following villages in the present town area became independent: Arikawa Village, Uonome Village, Kita-Uonome Village, Aokata Village, Hamano-ura Village, Narao Village, Wakamatsu Village, and Hinoshima Village.

1932, October 17 – Arikawa Village became Arikawa Town.

1941, April 1 – Aokata Village became Aokata Town.

1943, December 8 – Narao Village became Narao Town.

1956 June 1 – Aokata Town and Hamano-ura Village merged to form Kamigoto Town.

September 25 – Wakamatsu Village and Hinoshima Village merged to form Wakamatsu Town.

September 30 – Uonome Village and Kita-Uonome Village merged to form Shin-Uonome Town.

2004, August 1 – Arikawa Town, Kamigoto Town, Wakamatsu Town, Shin-Uonome Town, and Narao Town merged to form Shinkamigoto Town.

== Town Government ==
Mayors: 1st – Toshaki Inoue (井上 俊昭) (August 29, 2004 – August 28, 2012)

2nd – Etsuo Egami (江上 悦生) (August 29, 2012 – August 28, 2020)

3rd (Current) – Nobuaki Ishida (石田 信明) (August 29, 2020 – Present)

Town Council : Shinkamigoto Town Council has 16 seats.

== Industries ==
Fishing – Pursued through various methods such as seine net fishing and fixed net fishing, targeting species like mackerel, sardines, squid (Yari-ika, Aori-ika), kibi-nago, flying fish (Ago), ribbonfish, and snapper.

Agriculture – Includes processed goods like Goto udon noodles, "kankoro mochi" (sweet potato rice cake), "mame youkan" (bean jelly), camellia oil, and shochu (a type of liquor).

Tourism – Features the Saikai National Park, a collection of churches (Christian heritage sites), beaches, marine sports, and campgrounds.

In 2016, the town established the "Shinkamigoto Town Industry Support Center" (Sima-Biz, シマビズ), which handles the promotion of local products outside the island. [1]

== Gallery ==
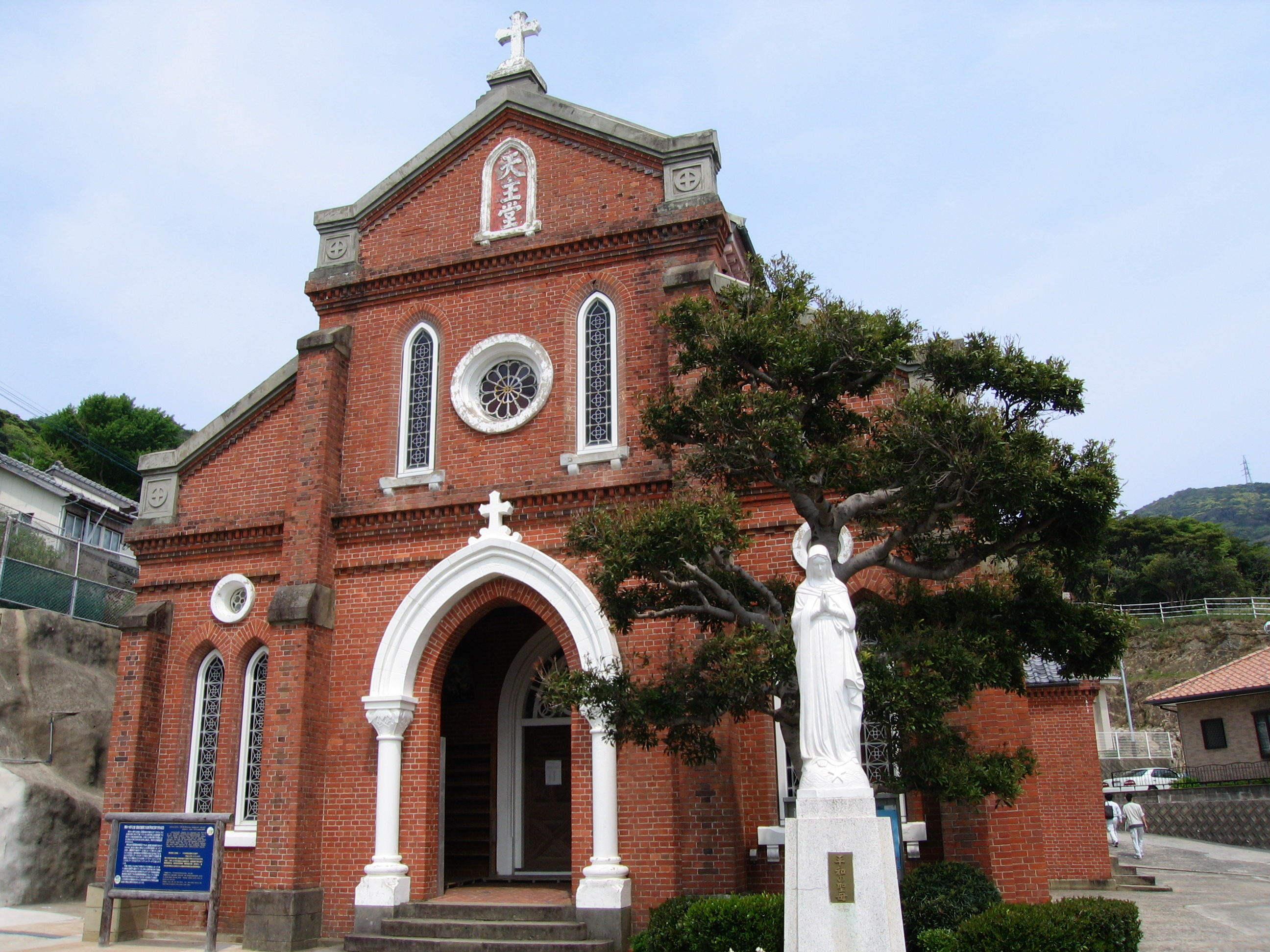
Aosagaura Church

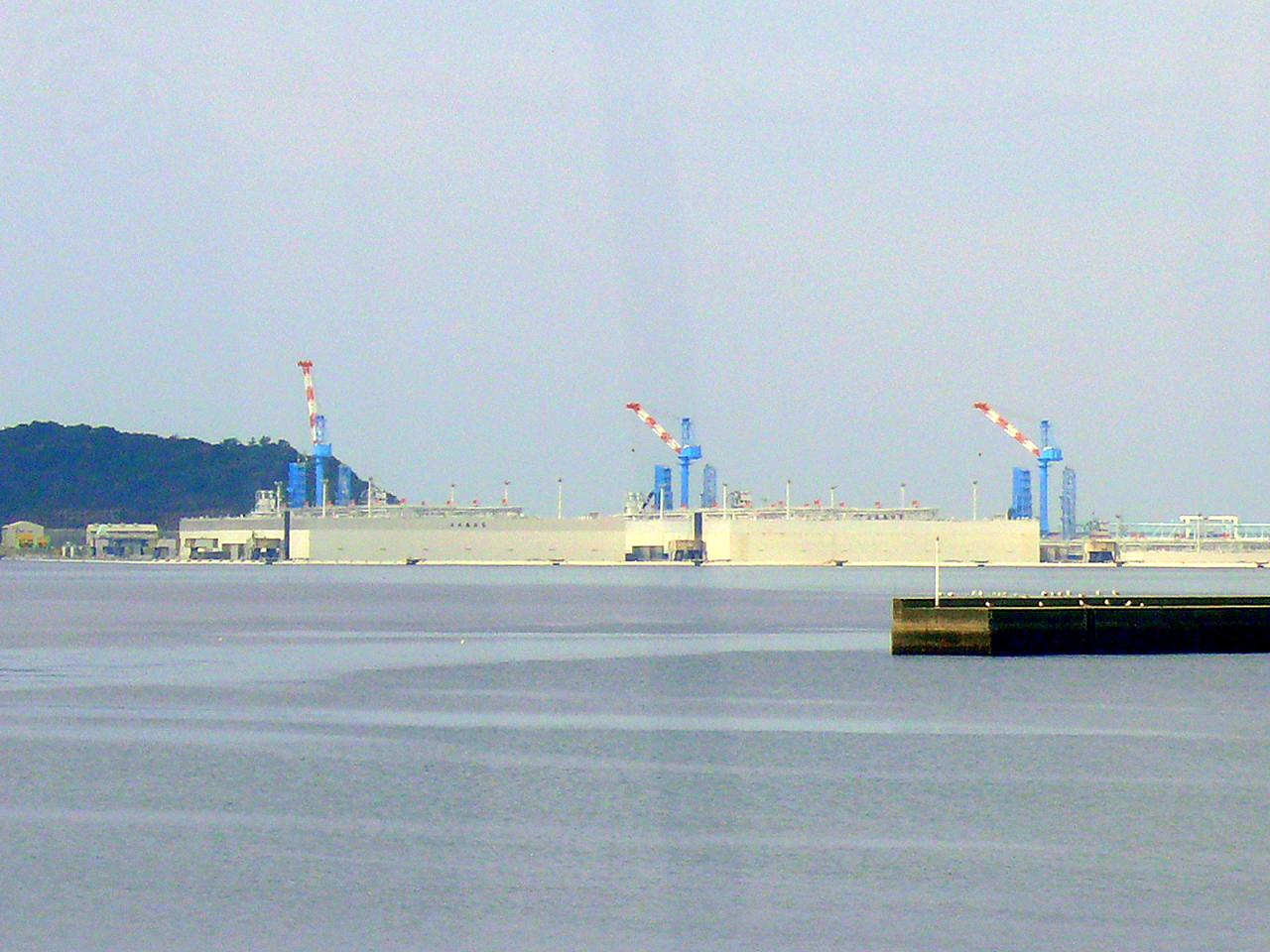
Oil Storage Company

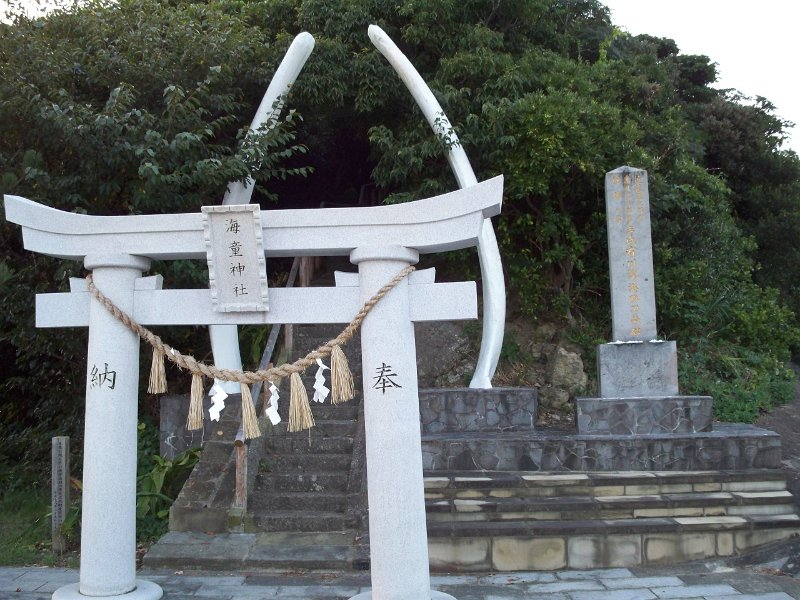
Whale Bone Shrine

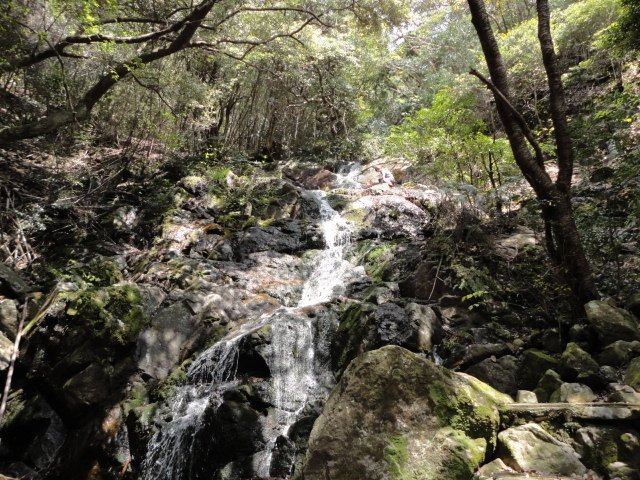
Hifumi Waterfall

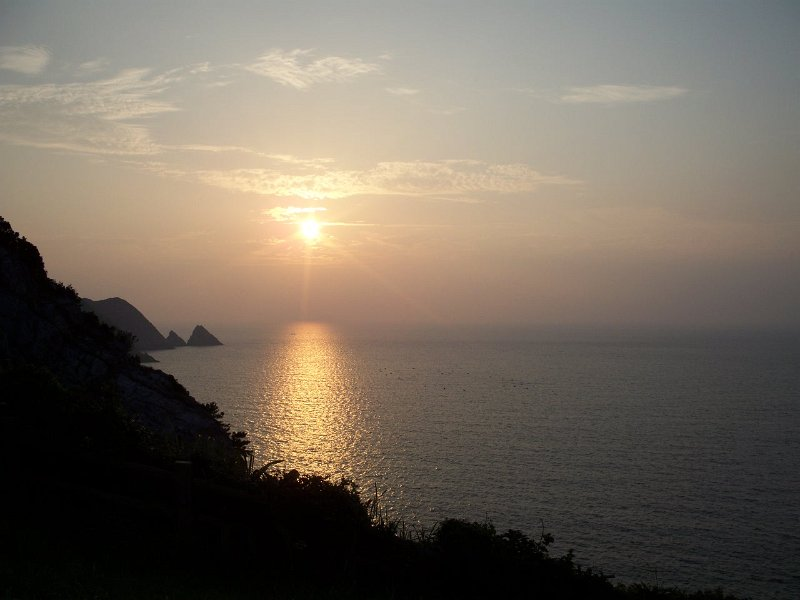
Yagatame Park

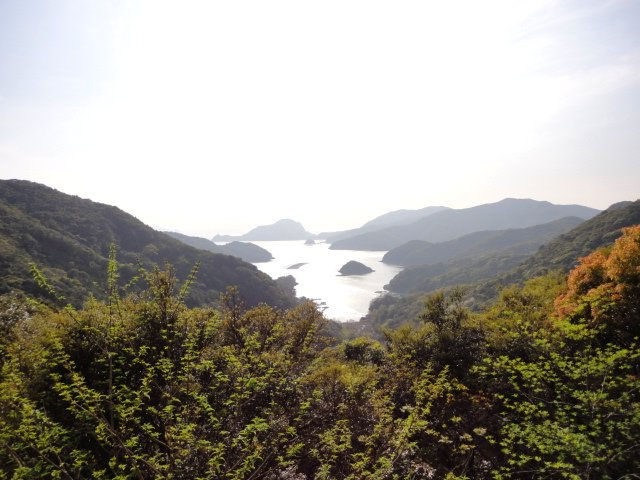
View of Koenoura Bay

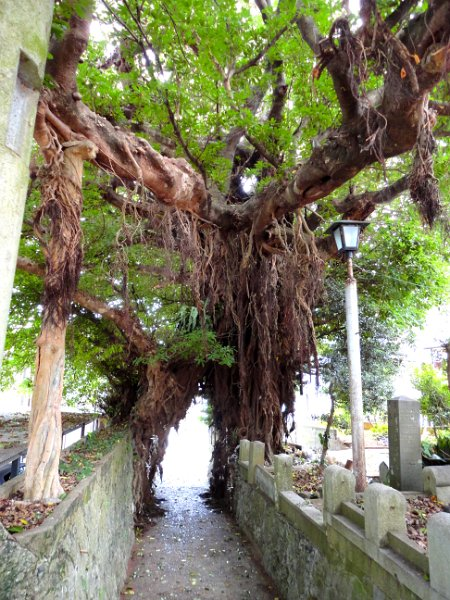
Great Tree of Akou

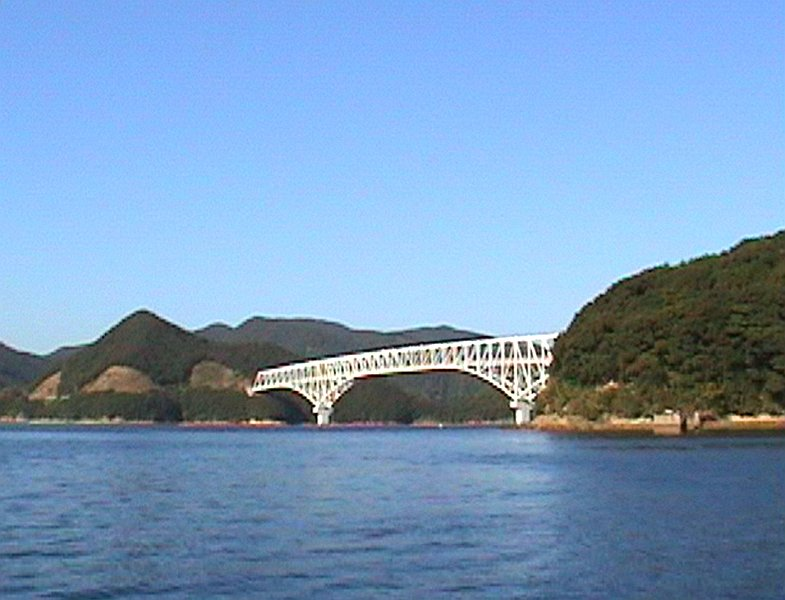
Wakamatsu Great Bridge

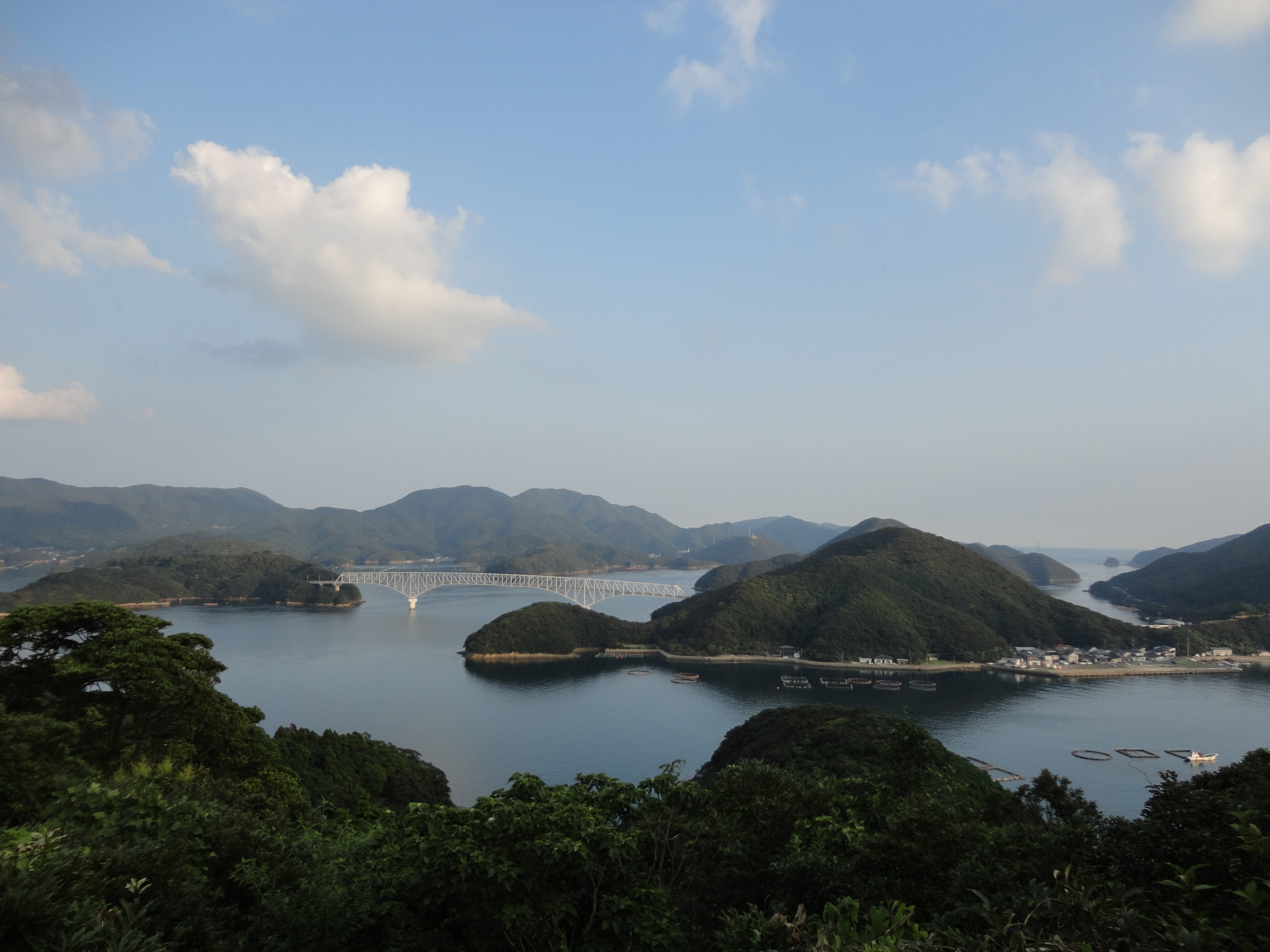
Wakamatsu Strait & Great Bridge from Ryūkanzan

== Transportation ==
=== Highway ===
National Route 384
