= Japan National Route 385 =

Road in Japan

National Route 385
- 国道385号

Route information
- Length: 68.1 km (42.3 mi)

Location
- Country: Japan

Highway system
- National highways of Japan; Expressways of Japan
← National Route 384	→ National Route 386

National Route 385 is a national highway of Japan connecting Yanagawa, Fukuoka and Hakata-ku, Fukuoka in Japan, with a total length of 68.1 km (42.32 mi).
