= Japan National Route 383 =

Road in Japan

National Route 383
- 国道383号
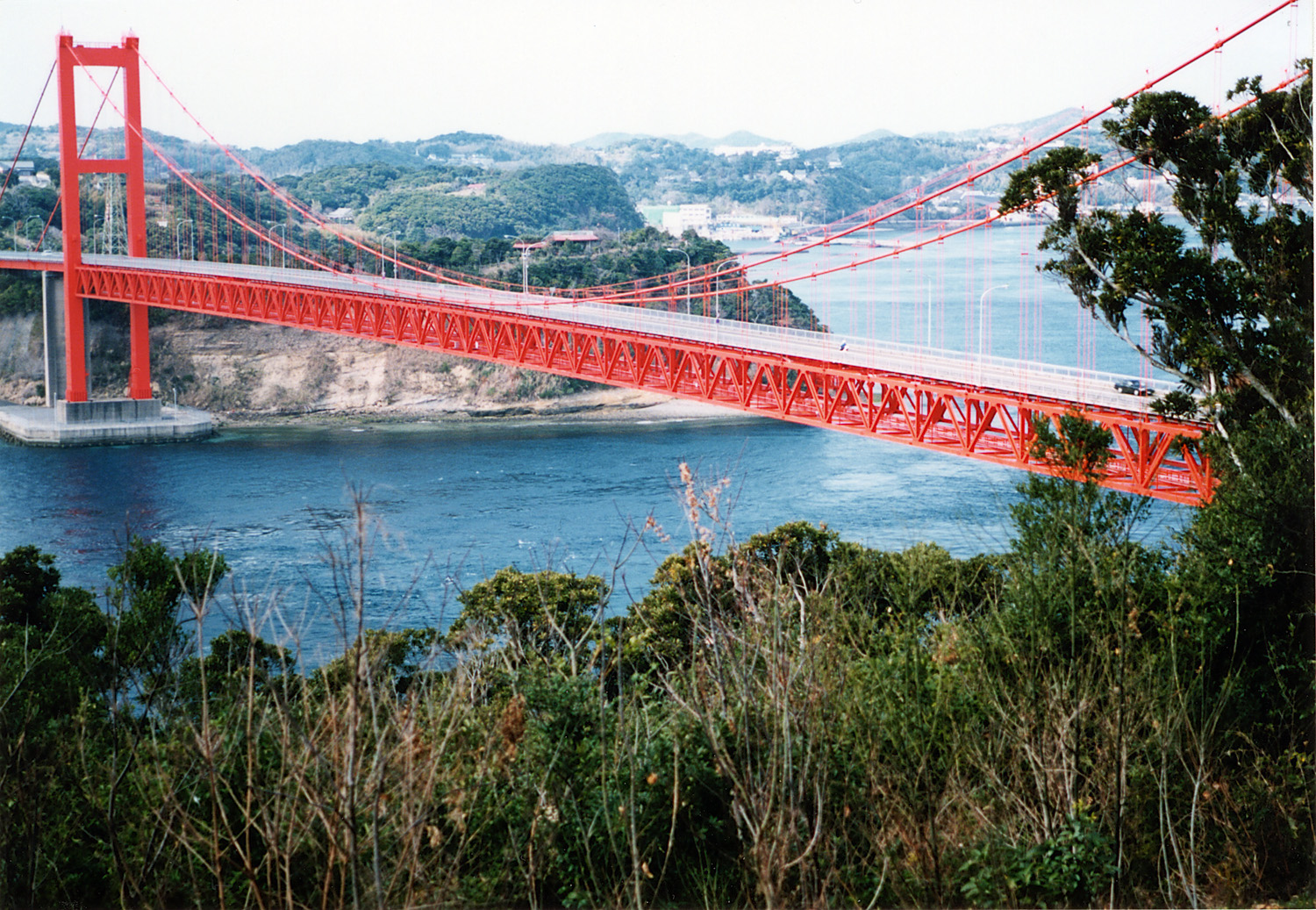
- The highway crossing the Hirado Bridge

Route information
- Length: 75.8 km (47.1 mi)

Location
- Country: Japan

Highway system
- National highways of Japan; Expressways of Japan
← National Route 382	→ National Route 384

National Route 383 is a national highway of Japan connecting Hirado, Nagasaki and Imari, Saga in Japan, with a total length of 75.8 km (47.1 mi).
