= Japan National Route 384 =

National highway in Japan

National Route 384
- 国道384号

Route information
- Length: 91.7 km (57.0 mi)

Location
- Country: Japan

Highway system
- National highways of Japan; Expressways of Japan
← National Route 383	→ National Route 385

National Route 384 is a national highway of Japan on the islands of Fukue and Nakadōri, Nagasaki Prefecture with a total length of 91.7 km (56.98 mi). The highway serves the towns of Gotō and Shin-Kamigotō.
