= Kashiragashima Church =

- 頭ヶ島天主堂
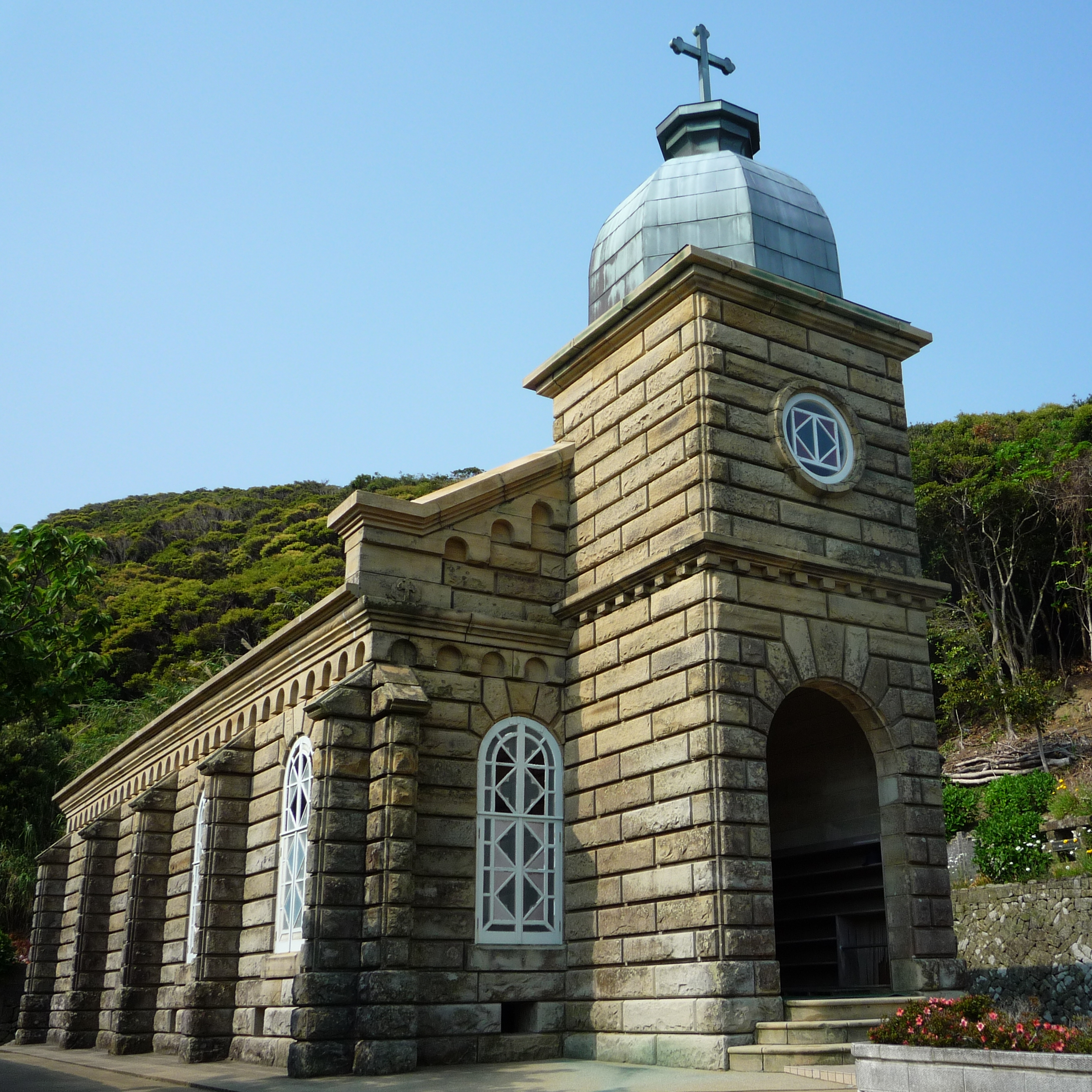
- The church's exterior in May 2008

- Location of the church Kashiragashima Church (Japan)
- 33.01243284429807°N 129.1828020860711°E
- Location: Shin-Kamigotō, Nagasaki
- Country: Japan
- Denomination: Roman Catholic
- Website: kyoukaigun.jp/en/visit/kashiragashima.php

Architecture
- Architect: Tetsukawa Yosuke
- Style: Romanesque
- Completed: 1919

Specifications
- Materials: Stone

Administration
- Archdiocese: Archdiocese of Nagasaki

Kashiragashima Church is a Catholic church in Shin-Kamigotō, Nagasaki, Japan.

The church was first constructed in 1887 as a wooden church but it was renovated and moved to its current location in 1918. It was inscribed as a World Heritage Site in 2018 along with the western side of Kashigarashima. It forms part of the Hidden Christian Sites in the Nagasaki Region World Heritage Site.

== History ==
Kashigaharashima was an uninhabited island until the late Edo-period when Hidden Christians started settling the island and forming communities. These christians were mostly immigrants from Nakadōri Island and Sotome who were evading persecution. After 1873 when the ban on Christianity was lifted construction of a church soon began. The island's first church was a wooden church that was built at the house of the local christian leader, Domingo Mori. Architect Tetsukawa Yosuke was tasked with creating a stone church for the island which he designed himself. Construction began in 1910 but was delayed due to lack of funding, many locals on the island chose to help quarry the stone to complete the church faster. Construction finished in 1919.

Due to the church's unique characteristics it was inscribed as an Important Cultural Property in 2001. In 2003 the church's surroundings were also inscribed as an Important Cultural Property.

In 2018 it was inscribed as a World Heritage Site along with the western side of Kashiragashima under the name "Villages on Kashiragashima Island", this component was inscribed as part of Hidden Christian Sites in the Nagasaki Region, due to bearing "testimony to the efforts of the Hidden Christians to maintain their faith through migration. As part of the World Heritage management plan, Kashigaharashima Church built digital signage in Chinese, Japanese, English and Korean in order to make information about the church more easily available to international visitors.

== Architecture ==
Kashiragashima Church is a stone church built in the Romanesque style. It was constructed out of sandstone quarried on Kashiragashima and its architect was Yosuke Tetsukawa, who was nicknamed "the father of church architecture" due to the many churches he designed around Japan. It was built using the technique of rustication and is the only stone church in Nagasaki Prefecture. The church's exterior features stained glass windows and its ceiling's feature floral patterns inspired by the Goto camellia.
