= Tsushima, Nagasaki =

Tsushima 対馬市
- City
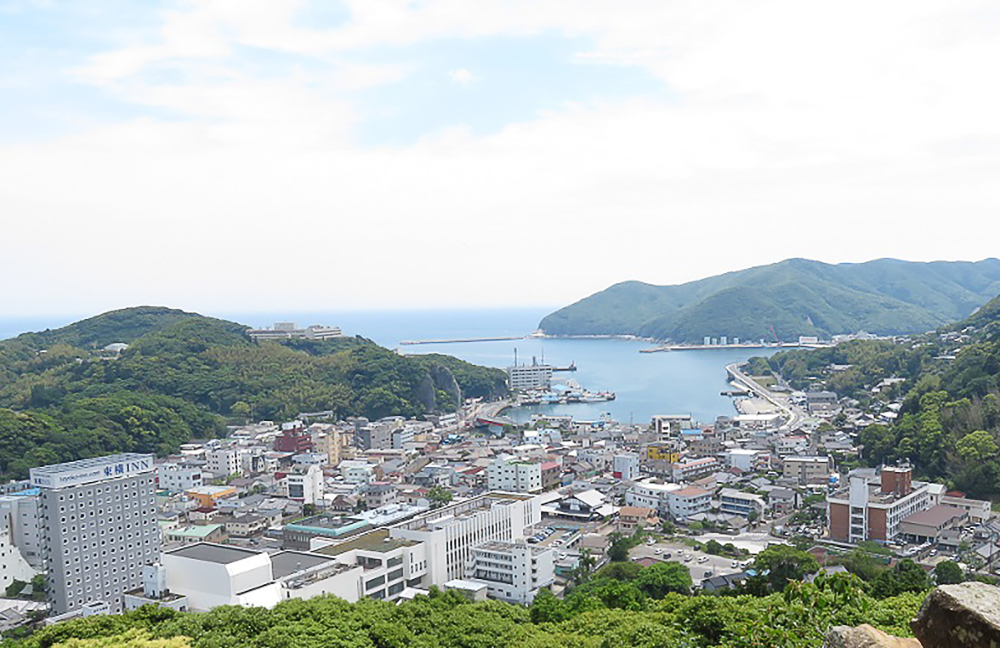
- A panorama view of downtown Izuhara, Tsushima from Mount Shimizu

- Flag Seal

- Location of Tsushima in Nagasaki Prefecture

- Location in Japan
- Coordinates: 34°12′N 129°17′E
- Country: Japan
- Region: Kyushu
- Prefecture: Nagasaki Prefecture
- First official recorded: 220 AD
- City settled: March 1, 2004

Government
  - Mayor: Naoki Hitakatsu

Area
  - Total: 708.61 km^{2} (273.60 sq mi)

Population (November 1, 2024)
  - Total: 25,945
  - Density: 36.614/km^{2} (94.830/sq mi)
- Time zone: UTC+09:00 (JST)
- Climate: Cfa
- Website: www.city.tsushima.nagasaki.jp
- Symbols
- Bird: Ring-necked pheasant
- Flower: Azalea
- Tree: Chionanthus retusus

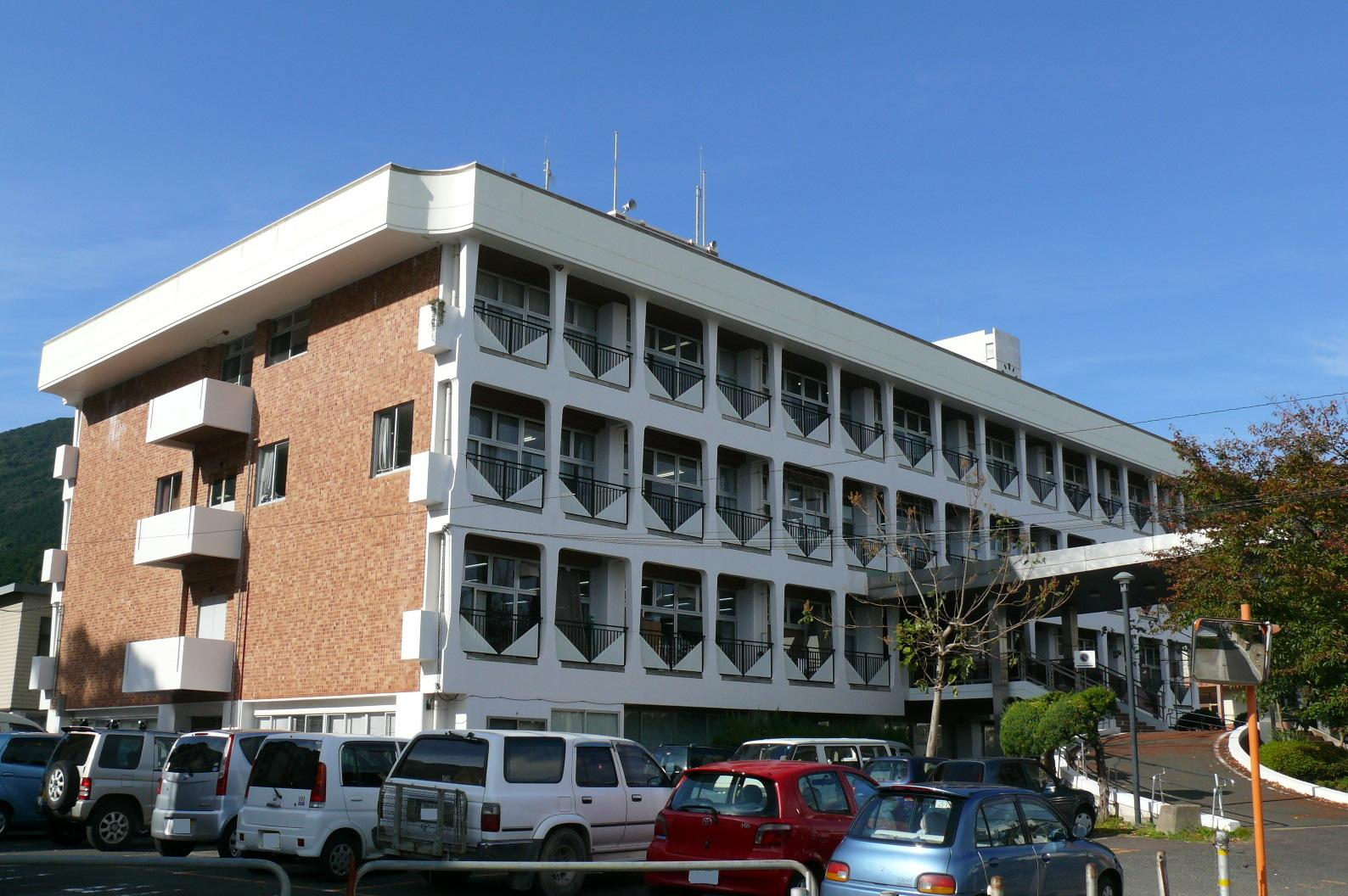
Tsushima City-hall

Tsushima (対馬市, Tsushima-shi; Japanese pronunciation: [t͡sɨ̥.ɕì.mä̀, -ɕí.mä̀, -ɕí.mä́.ɕì]) is an island city grouped in Nagasaki Prefecture, Japan. It is the only city of Tsushima Subprefecture and it encompasses all of Tsushima Island, which lies in the Tsushima Strait north of Nagasaki on the western side of Kyushu, the southernmost mainland island of Japan. As of March 2017, the city has an estimated population of 31,550 and a population density of 45 persons per km^{2}. Its total area is 708.61 km^{2}, 17.3% of the area of Nagasaki Prefecture.

== History ==
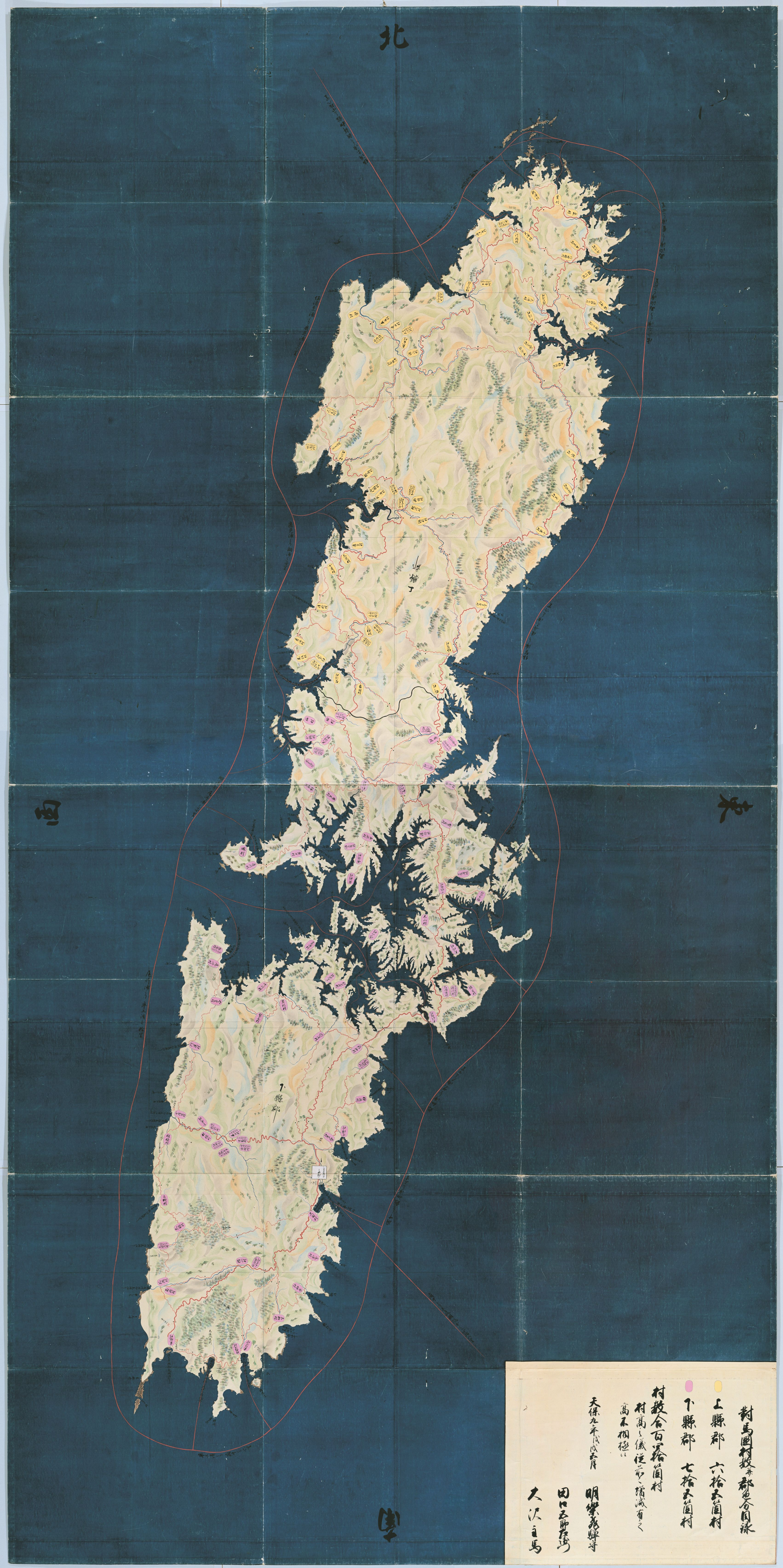
A map of Tsushima Province in 1838 (Japanese language edition)

An Imperial decree in July 1899 established Izuhara, Sasuna, and Shishimi as open ports for trading with the United States and the United Kingdom.

On April 1, 1975, Toyotama Village was promoted to the status of a town. Mine Village was also elevated to the status of a town in the following year.

The modern city of Tsushima was established on March 1, 2004, from the merger of six towns on Tsushima Island: Izuhara, Mitsushima, and Toyotama (all from Shimoagata District), and Mine, Kamiagata, and Kamitsushima (all from Kamiagata District). Both districts were dissolved as a result of this merger.

== Geography ==
The city of Tsushima is located on Tsushima Island and other small neighbouring islands, lying slightly to the west side of Tsushima Strait, south of the Sea of Japan and north-east of the East China Sea. The island also lies between the Korean Peninsula and the Japanese mainland. Its coastline has a total length of 915 km. Asō Bay, a prominent bay with a rias coastline, is located between the islands. Tsushima lies about 60 km from Iki, 138 km from the city of Fukuoka, and 49.5 km from Busan, South Korea.

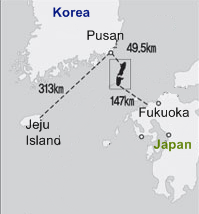

=== Islands ===
Several other islands encompass Tsushima city, in addition to Kamino-shima and Shimono-shima, both of which makes up the Tsushima Island(s):

- Santsu-jima (三ッ島)
- Shimayama-jima (島山島)
- Uni Island

=== Flora and fauna ===
==== Tsushima cat ====
Native to the island is the Tsushima cat (or Tsushima leopard cat, an endemic subspecies of the leopard cat, Prionailurus bengalensis). Present on the islands since ancient times, its numbers have decreased sharply, and it is now listed as a critically endangered species on the Japanese Red List. As of 2009, it was estimated that only 80 to 100 animals remain.

=== Climate ===
Tsushima has a humid subtropical climate (Köppen climate classification Cfa) with very warm summers and cool winters. Precipitation is significant throughout the year, but is much heavier in summer than in winter.

Climate data for Izuhara, Tsushima (1991–2020 normals, extremes 1886–present)
Month	Jan	Feb	Mar	Apr	May	Jun	Jul	Aug	Sep	Oct	Nov	Dec	Year
Record high °C (°F)	19.8 (67.6)	21.3 (70.3)	24.4 (75.9)	27.8 (82.0)	32.0 (89.6)	33.0 (91.4)	36.9 (98.4)	36.8 (98.2)	34.6 (94.3)	30.2 (86.4)	26.9 (80.4)	22.3 (72.1)	36.9 (98.4)
Mean daily maximum °C (°F)	9.2 (48.6)	10.5 (50.9)	13.6 (56.5)	18.1 (64.6)	22.2 (72.0)	24.7 (76.5)	28.3 (82.9)	30.0 (86.0)	26.5 (79.7)	22.3 (72.1)	17.1 (62.8)	11.6 (52.9)	19.5 (67.1)
Daily mean °C (°F)	6.0 (42.8)	6.9 (44.4)	10.0 (50.0)	14.2 (57.6)	18.2 (64.8)	21.3 (70.3)	25.4 (77.7)	26.8 (80.2)	23.4 (74.1)	18.7 (65.7)	13.3 (55.9)	8.0 (46.4)	16.0 (60.8)
Mean daily minimum °C (°F)	2.5 (36.5)	3.2 (37.8)	6.3 (43.3)	10.3 (50.5)	14.4 (57.9)	18.5 (65.3)	23.1 (73.6)	24.2 (75.6)	20.6 (69.1)	15.3 (59.5)	9.6 (49.3)	4.9 (40.8)	12.7 (54.9)
Record low °C (°F)	−7.7 (18.1)	−8.6 (16.5)	−5.2 (22.6)	−1.3 (29.7)	4.8 (40.6)	6.2 (43.2)	12.2 (54.0)	13.6 (56.5)	8.8 (47.8)	0.7 (33.3)	−2.7 (27.1)	−6.4 (20.5)	−8.6 (16.5)
Average precipitation mm (inches)	80.1 (3.15)	94.7 (3.73)	172.3 (6.78)	218.4 (8.60)	241.2 (9.50)	294.4 (11.59)	370.5 (14.59)	326.4 (12.85)	235.5 (9.27)	120.8 (4.76)	100.6 (3.96)	68.0 (2.68)	2,302.6 (90.65)
Average snowfall cm (inches)	0 (0)	0 (0)	0 (0)	0 (0)	0 (0)	0 (0)	0 (0)	0 (0)	0 (0)	0 (0)	0 (0)	0 (0)	0 (0)
Average precipitation days (≥ 1.0 mm)	6.4	6.8	9.0	9.0	8.2	10.8	11.6	10.5	9.0	5.6	6.6	6.3	99.8
Average snowy days (≥ 1 cm)	0	0	0	0	0	0	0	0	0	0	0	0	0
Average relative humidity (%)	61	62	65	68	72	82	83	81	78	70	68	63	71
Mean monthly sunshine hours	147.6	143.5	161.5	183.1	199.2	136.3	136.1	160.4	131.1	161.1	149.0	153.9	1,862.8
Source: Japan Meteorological Agency

Climate data for Mitsushima, Tsushima (2003–2020 normals, extremes 2003–present)
Month	Jan	Feb	Mar	Apr	May	Jun	Jul	Aug	Sep	Oct	Nov	Dec	Year
Record high °C (°F)	19.6 (67.3)	21.5 (70.7)	22.5 (72.5)	25.4 (77.7)	29.8 (85.6)	31.5 (88.7)	35.4 (95.7)	35.7 (96.3)	33.4 (92.1)	29.5 (85.1)	26.3 (79.3)	21.9 (71.4)	35.7 (96.3)
Mean daily maximum °C (°F)	8.1 (46.6)	9.7 (49.5)	12.9 (55.2)	17.3 (63.1)	21.6 (70.9)	24.1 (75.4)	27.9 (82.2)	29.5 (85.1)	25.8 (78.4)	21.5 (70.7)	16.3 (61.3)	10.4 (50.7)	18.8 (65.8)
Daily mean °C (°F)	5.5 (41.9)	6.7 (44.1)	9.6 (49.3)	13.7 (56.7)	17.8 (64.0)	20.9 (69.6)	24.9 (76.8)	26.5 (79.7)	22.9 (73.2)	18.4 (65.1)	13.3 (55.9)	7.6 (45.7)	15.7 (60.2)
Mean daily minimum °C (°F)	2.7 (36.9)	3.6 (38.5)	6.4 (43.5)	10.3 (50.5)	14.5 (58.1)	18.4 (65.1)	22.6 (72.7)	24.1 (75.4)	20.6 (69.1)	15.6 (60.1)	10.1 (50.2)	4.6 (40.3)	12.8 (55.0)
Record low °C (°F)	−6.5 (20.3)	−6.4 (20.5)	−2.7 (27.1)	3.4 (38.1)	7.1 (44.8)	11.5 (52.7)	16.8 (62.2)	18.9 (66.0)	14.5 (58.1)	8.3 (46.9)	1.3 (34.3)	−4.7 (23.5)	−6.5 (20.3)
Average precipitation mm (inches)	60.9 (2.40)	80.3 (3.16)	130.1 (5.12)	157.8 (6.21)	179.8 (7.08)	224.3 (8.83)	325.9 (12.83)	249.2 (9.81)	247.6 (9.75)	96.6 (3.80)	73.3 (2.89)	56.4 (2.22)	1,882.2 (74.10)
Average precipitation days (≥ 1.0 mm)	5.9	6.9	8.5	8.3	7.4	9.5	11.4	8.6	9.6	5.7	6.3	5.9	94
Source: Japan Meteorological Agency

Climate data for Uni Island (1995–2020 normals, extremes 1995–present)
Month	Jan	Feb	Mar	Apr	May	Jun	Jul	Aug	Sep	Oct	Nov	Dec	Year
Record high °C (°F)	19.9 (67.8)	21.3 (70.3)	23.1 (73.6)	26.0 (78.8)	29.7 (85.5)	30.6 (87.1)	35.6 (96.1)	36.7 (98.1)	31.7 (89.1)	29.6 (85.3)	24.3 (75.7)	21.5 (70.7)	36.7 (98.1)
Mean daily maximum °C (°F)	8.6 (47.5)	10.1 (50.2)	13.4 (56.1)	17.5 (63.5)	21.2 (70.2)	23.7 (74.7)	27.1 (80.8)	28.9 (84.0)	25.3 (77.5)	21.4 (70.5)	16.2 (61.2)	10.8 (51.4)	18.7 (65.6)
Daily mean °C (°F)	5.8 (42.4)	6.9 (44.4)	9.9 (49.8)	13.9 (57.0)	17.8 (64.0)	20.8 (69.4)	24.4 (75.9)	26.1 (79.0)	22.9 (73.2)	18.9 (66.0)	13.6 (56.5)	8.0 (46.4)	15.8 (60.3)
Mean daily minimum °C (°F)	3.4 (38.1)	4.5 (40.1)	7.3 (45.1)	11.3 (52.3)	15.3 (59.5)	18.7 (65.7)	22.5 (72.5)	24.3 (75.7)	21.2 (70.2)	17.0 (62.6)	11.4 (52.5)	5.6 (42.1)	13.5 (56.4)
Record low °C (°F)	−7.8 (18.0)	−6.8 (19.8)	−3.4 (25.9)	2.4 (36.3)	9.4 (48.9)	14.0 (57.2)	15.9 (60.6)	18.7 (65.7)	16.3 (61.3)	4.7 (40.5)	1.1 (34.0)	−6.2 (20.8)	−7.8 (18.0)
Average precipitation mm (inches)	43.3 (1.70)	46.9 (1.85)	87.5 (3.44)	105.1 (4.14)	113.6 (4.47)	191.5 (7.54)	264.9 (10.43)	230.7 (9.08)	159.9 (6.30)	78.8 (3.10)	65.8 (2.59)	36.8 (1.45)	1,434.9 (56.49)
Average precipitation days (≥ 1.0 mm)	5.6	5.8	8.1	8.1	7.4	9.5	10.4	9.0	8.7	5.5	6.2	4.8	89.1
Mean monthly sunshine hours	180.2	168.3	198.6	210.2	220.1	151.5	168.0	197.1	152.9	179.7	168.8	182.4	2,173.5
Source: Japan Meteorological Agency

== Demographics and culture ==
The population of Tsushima Island has been decreasing significantly. Between the years of 1995 and 2000, the decline was 5.2%. As nuclear families replace the traditional extended families, the average household is smaller, as is the total population. The elderly comprise nearly a quarter of the population here, compared to 20.8% of the Nagasaki Prefecture as a whole, and 17.3% of the population of Japan.

Religious traditions on Tsushima Island mirror those of the rest of Japan, with a majority of the population adhering to Buddhism or Shinto.

Years	1975	1980	1985	1990	1995	2000
Total Population	52,472	50,810	48,875	46,064	43,513	41,230
Age 0–14	14,449	12,845	11,615	10,050	8,352	6,834
Age 15–64	33,028	32,528	31,376	29,264	27,145	25,001
Age 65 & older	4,995	5,437	5,884	6,735	8,016	9,395
Households	14,760	15,176	15,232	15,164	15,169	15,038

== Economy ==
Many Tsushima residents are employed as fishermen. It is also known for its pearl culture. The natural environment of the Tsushima Islands also contributes to the local tourism industry. Beaches are crowded with tourists in the summer.

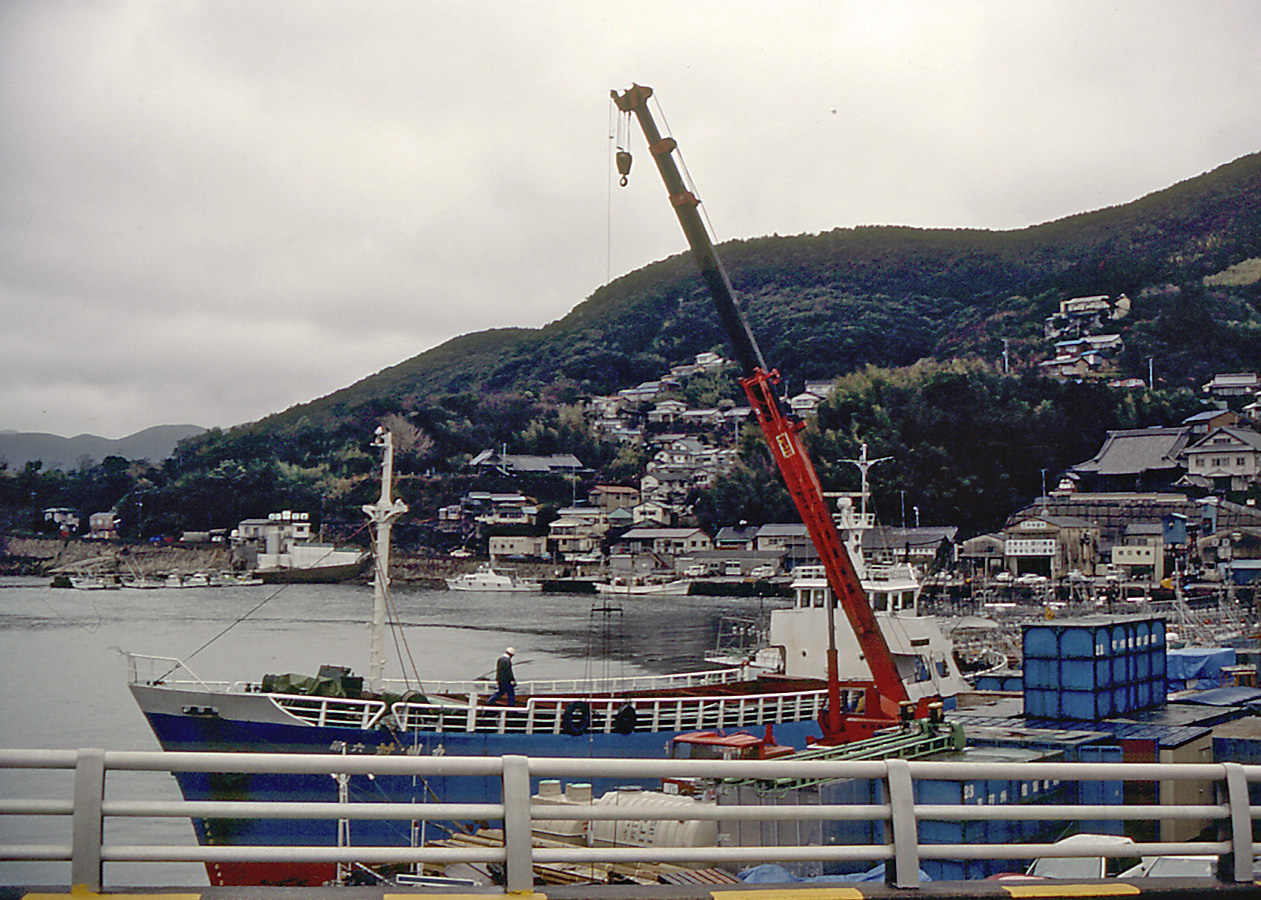
Harbor in Tsushima (1990)

== Transportation ==
=== Airport ===
Tsushima Airport (TSJ) is approximately 10 km (6.2 mi) northeast of the city, with daily services to Fukuoka and Nagasaki serviced by ANA and Oriental Air Bridge.

=== Seaport ===
Tsushima has two sea ports, Izuhara and Hitakatsu. Ferries cross to the port of Hakata on Kyūshū a few times per day. Ferries also travel a few times a week to Busan in South Korea on the northern port of the island.

=== Road ===
- Japan National Route 382

== Broadcasting ==
Tsushima has received 12 digital TV channels from Fukuoka and mainland Nagasaki prefectures : NHK-G 11, NHK-E 21, NBC 31 (JNN), NIB 41 (NNN / NNS), NCC 51 (ANN), KBC 11 (ANN), TVQ 71 (TX Network), KTN 81 (FNN/FNS), Rkb+ 41 (JNN), FBS 51 (NNN/NNS), CATV 111, and TNC 81 (FNN/FNS); along with its radio frequencies. In addition, the island could receive South Korean TV channels (KBS, MBC and SBS-affiliated KNN) and radio frequencies, due to its location nearby to the port city of Busan.

== Sister cities ==
- Busan, South Korea
- Guam, United States

== See also ==
- History of Japan
  - Battle of Tsushima
  - Japanese invasions of Korea (1592–1598)
  - Oei Invasion (応永の外寇)
- So clan
- Tsushima Fuchu domain
