= Uni Island =

Island in Tsushima, Japan

Native name: 海栗島
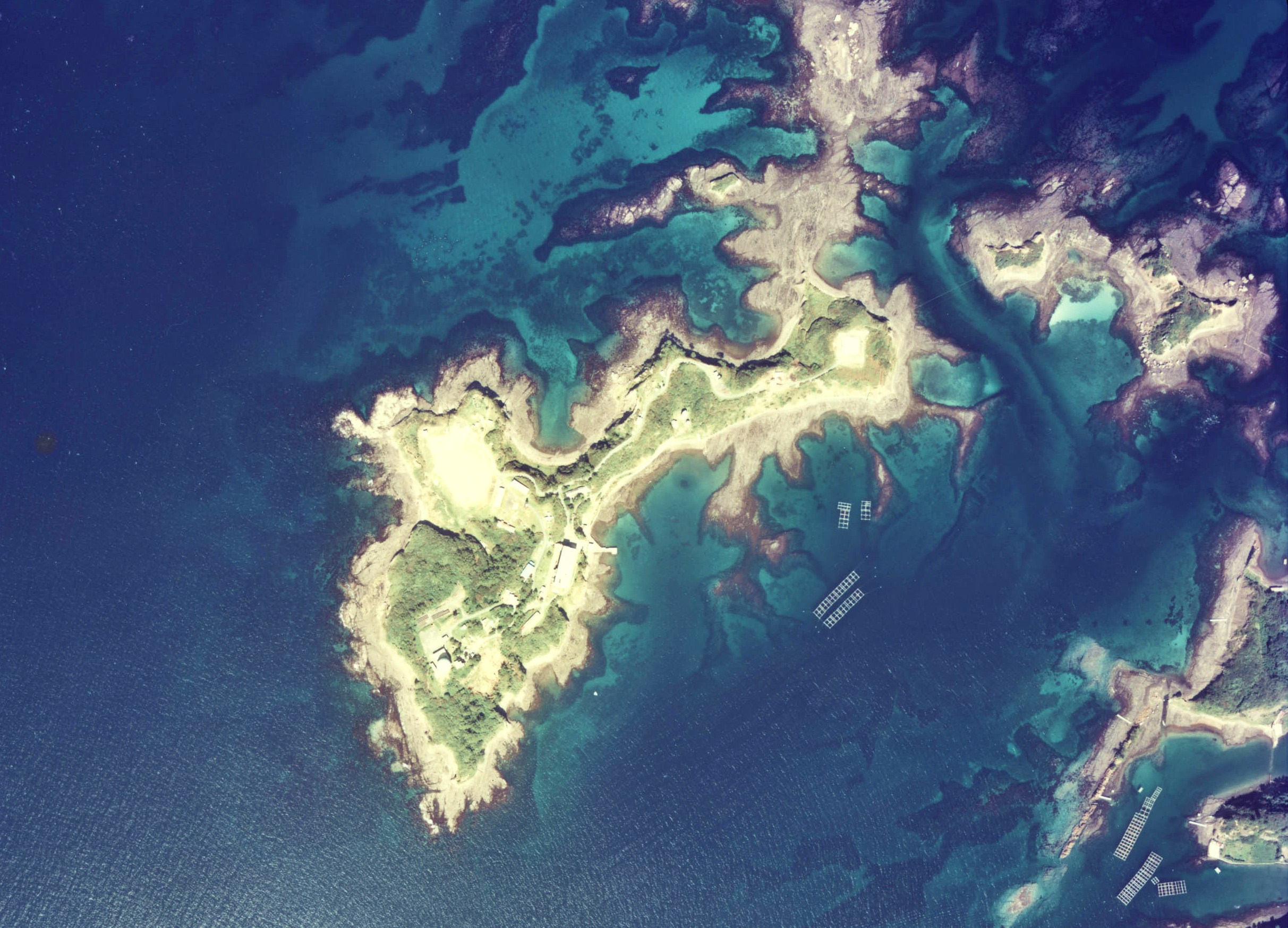
- Aerial view of Uni Island (photographed in 1977)

- Location within Nagasaki Prefecture Location within Japan

Geography
- Location: Sea of Japan (Tsushima Strait, Korea Strait)
- Coordinates: 34°42′22.2″N 129°26′9.7″E
- Archipelago: Tsushima Islands
- Area: 0.129766 km^{2} (0.050103 sq mi)

Administration
- Japan
- Prefecture: Nagasaki Prefecture
- Largest settlement: Tsushima

Demographics
- Demonym: 対馬
- Population: 60
- Pop. density: 462.37/km^{2} (1197.53/sq mi)
- Ethnic groups: Japanese, Koreans

Uni Island (Japanese: 海栗島) is an island located in Tsushima, Nagasaki Prefecture, Japan, on the border between Japan and South Korea. The entire territory of Uni Island is state-owned land, and the Air Self-Defense Force is stationed on the island (the unit is the 19th Vigilance Team of the Western Air Vigilance Control Regiment under the Western Air Front). Therefore, except for military personnel, access to the island is not permitted.

Although there are no residential buildings on the island, Haikuri Island is not uninhabited as the Ministry of Defense has a government building. In the village of Waniura near Tsushima Island, a festival called the Itobatago Festival (Japanese: ひとつばたご祭り), during which villagers are allowed to visit the island to participate in the event, and local ferries are commissioned by the Self-Defense Forces to transport the crew three times a day.

The origin of the island's name comes from the fact that many sea urchins settle around the island, as the name Uni (Japanese: ウニ) means sea urchin in Japanese.

== History ==
- In 1903, the Imperial Japanese Army Ministry established a radio base on Uni Island.
- In 1935, the Uni Island Battery was completed, and the island served as a military base until the end of World War II. After the war it was handed over to the private sector for use as agricultural land.
- In February 1955, Unit 9056 of the Western Training Vigilance Team of the Japan Air Self-Defense Force was formed in Fukuoka City.
- In April 1956, the guard was relocated to Uni Island and began military cooperation with the U.S. Department of Defense and the DAF.
- In July 1961, the 19th Alert Group of the Western Air Alert Control Regiment of the Japan Air Self-Defense Force was changed to the 19th Alert Group.
- In March 2003, it was reorganized into the 19th Vigilance Squad.

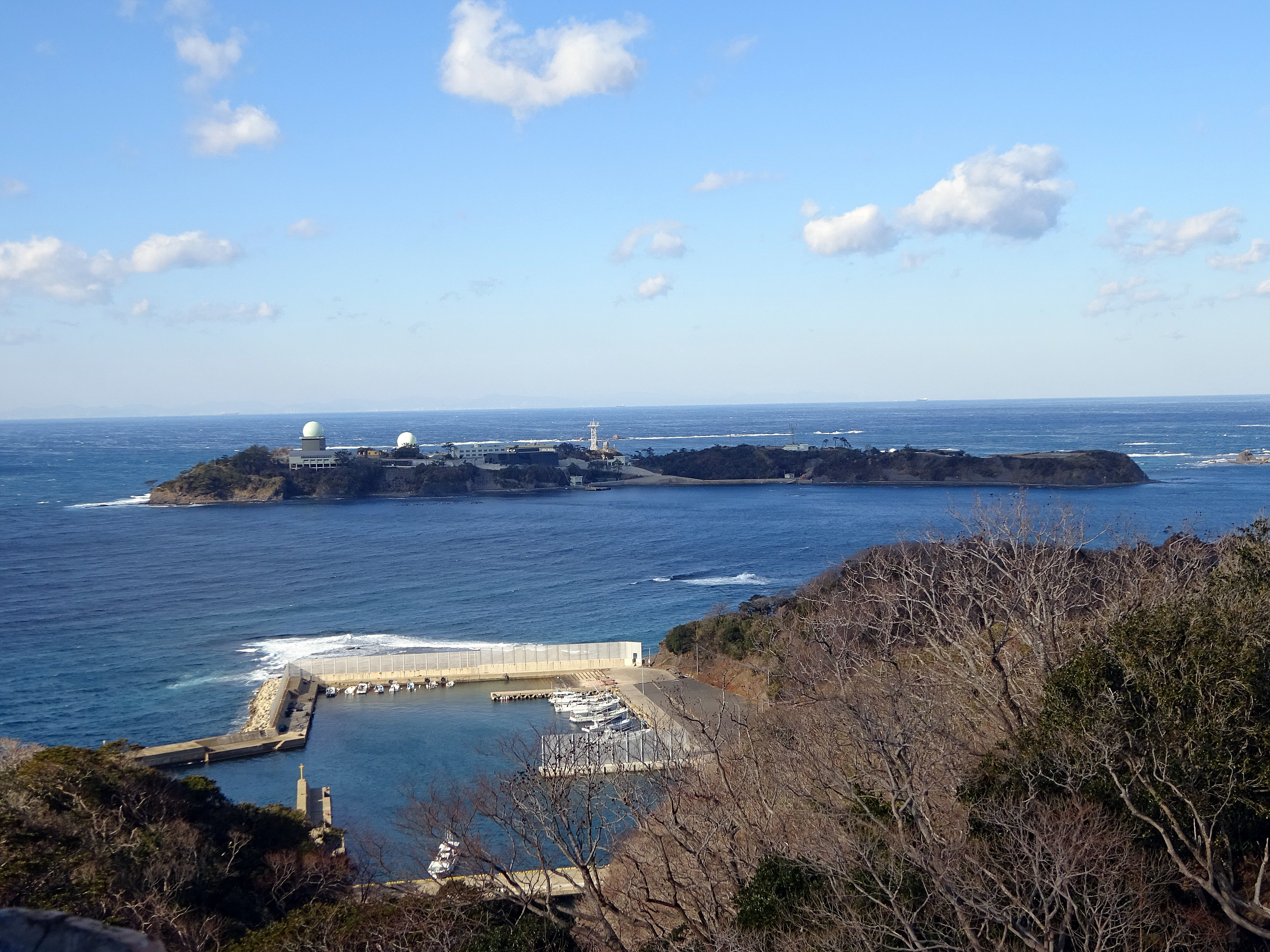
Uni Island seen from Tsushima Island

== Geography ==
Located at the northernmost tip of Tsushima in Nagasaki Prefecture, Japan, the island is only 40 km (25 mi) in a straight line from South Korea. The island has an area of 0.13 km^{2} (0.050 sq mi) and a coastline of about 4 km (2.5 mi). Transportation to Kaikuri Island is very inconvenient, and there is no bridge connecting it to the main island of Tsushima.

=== Climate ===
Uni Island has a humid subtropical climate (Köppen climate classification Cfa. The average annual temperature in Uni Island is 15.8 °C (60.4 °F). The average annual rainfall is 1,434.9 mm (56.49 in) with July as the wettest month. The temperatures are highest on average in August, at around 26.1 °C (79.0 °F), and lowest in January, at around 5.8 °C (42.4 °F). The highest temperature ever recorded in Uni Island was 36.0 °C (96.8 °F) on 19 August 2013; the coldest temperature ever recorded was −7.8 °C (18.0 °F) on 16 January 2011.

Climate data for Uni Island (1991−2020 normals, extremes 1995−present)
Month	Jan	Feb	Mar	Apr	May	Jun	Jul	Aug	Sep	Oct	Nov	Dec	Year
Record high °C (°F)	19.9 (67.8)	21.3 (70.3)	23.1 (73.6)	26.0 (78.8)	29.7 (85.5)	30.3 (86.5)	35.1 (95.2)	36.0 (96.8)	31.7 (89.1)	29.6 (85.3)	24.3 (75.7)	21.5 (70.7)	36.0 (96.8)
Mean daily maximum °C (°F)	8.6 (47.5)	10.1 (50.2)	13.4 (56.1)	17.5 (63.5)	21.2 (70.2)	23.7 (74.7)	27.1 (80.8)	28.9 (84.0)	25.3 (77.5)	21.4 (70.5)	16.2 (61.2)	10.8 (51.4)	18.7 (65.6)
Daily mean °C (°F)	5.8 (42.4)	6.9 (44.4)	9.9 (49.8)	13.9 (57.0)	17.8 (64.0)	20.8 (69.4)	24.4 (75.9)	26.1 (79.0)	22.9 (73.2)	18.9 (66.0)	13.6 (56.5)	8.0 (46.4)	15.8 (60.3)
Mean daily minimum °C (°F)	3.4 (38.1)	4.5 (40.1)	7.3 (45.1)	11.3 (52.3)	15.3 (59.5)	18.7 (65.7)	22.5 (72.5)	24.3 (75.7)	21.2 (70.2)	17.0 (62.6)	11.4 (52.5)	5.6 (42.1)	13.5 (56.4)
Record low °C (°F)	−7.8 (18.0)	−6.8 (19.8)	−3.4 (25.9)	2.4 (36.3)	9.4 (48.9)	14.0 (57.2)	15.9 (60.6)	18.7 (65.7)	16.3 (61.3)	4.7 (40.5)	1.1 (34.0)	−6.2 (20.8)	−7.8 (18.0)
Average precipitation mm (inches)	43.3 (1.70)	46.9 (1.85)	87.5 (3.44)	105.1 (4.14)	113.6 (4.47)	191.5 (7.54)	264.9 (10.43)	230.7 (9.08)	159.9 (6.30)	78.8 (3.10)	65.8 (2.59)	36.8 (1.45)	1,434.9 (56.49)
Average precipitation days (≥ 1.0 mm)	5.6	5.8	8.1	8.1	7.4	9.5	10.4	9.0	8.7	5.5	6.2	4.8	89.1
Mean monthly sunshine hours	180.2	168.3	198.6	210.2	220.1	151.5	168.0	197.1	152.9	179.7	168.8	182.4	2,173.5
Source: Japan Meteorological Agency
