= Kamigotō Airport =

Kamigotō Airport 上五島空港
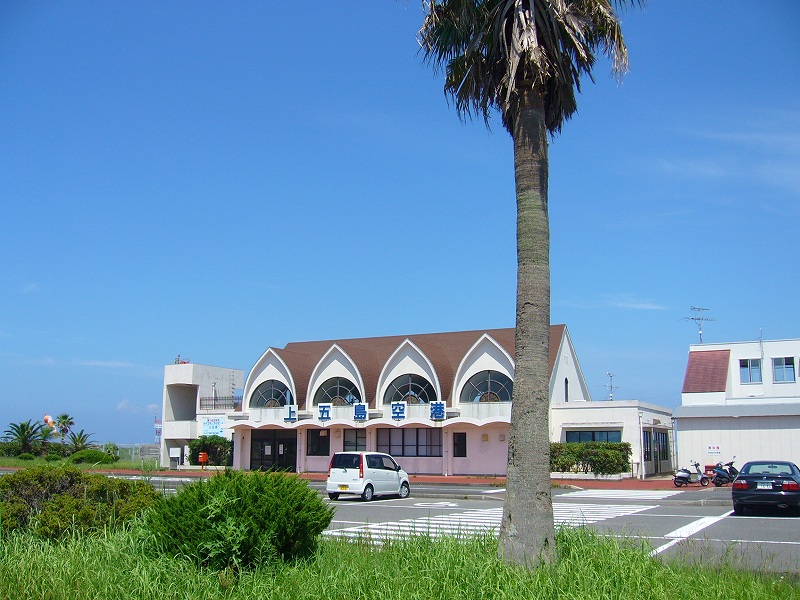
- IATA: none; ICAO: RJDK

Summary
- Airport type: Public
- Operator: Nagasaki Prefecture
- Location: Shinkamigotō, Japan
- Elevation AMSL: 263 ft (80 m)
- Coordinates: 33°00′49″N 129°11′33″E

Map
- Location within Nagasaki Prefecture Location within Japan

Runways
Direction	Length		Surface
Direction	m	ft	Surface
17/35	800	2,625	Asphalt concrete
- Source: Japanese AIP at AIS Japan

Kamigotō Airport (ICAO: RJDK) is a public aerodrome located on Kashiragashima Island (頭ヶ島), a smaller bridge-linked island just off the far east coast of Nakadorijima in the Gotō Islands, Nagasaki Prefecture, Japan. The site is about 8 km (5.0 mi) northeast of Kamigotō town office, Shinkamigotō. The terminal was renovated in July 2015 and the airport remains active for emergency medical shuttles, but commercial passenger routes have been suspended for several years. Given the airport's lack of traffic and its unusually remote location, the runway has been used occasionally as a venue for 'dark sky' appreciation tours with tourists lying on the runway and staring at the cosmos above.

== History ==
The airport opened in April 1981 (Showa 56) with a 800m long, 25m wide landing strip built along the entire north–south flattened top of Kashiragashima. Nagasaki Airways, rebranded after March 2001 as Oriental Air Bridge, operated small passenger planes to Fukuoka Airport (until March 2004) and to Nagasaki Airport (until March 2006). By this time, new fast ferry services, combined with a falling island populations and the ever unreliable weather conditions (strong winds often causing cancellations), led to the suspension of commercial passenger flights. The nearest active airport is Gotō-Fukue Airport which continue to serve the Island.
