= Japan National Route 382 =

National highway in Japan

National Route 382
- 国道382号

Route information
- Length: 125.2 km (77.8 mi)

Location
- Country: Japan

Highway system
- National highways of Japan; Expressways of Japan
← National Route 381	→ National Route 383

National Route 382 is a national highway of Japan connecting Tsushima, Nagasaki and Karatsu, Saga in Japan, with a total length of 125.2 km (77.8 mi). The highway includes segments on the islands of Tsushima and Iki, as well on Kyushu.

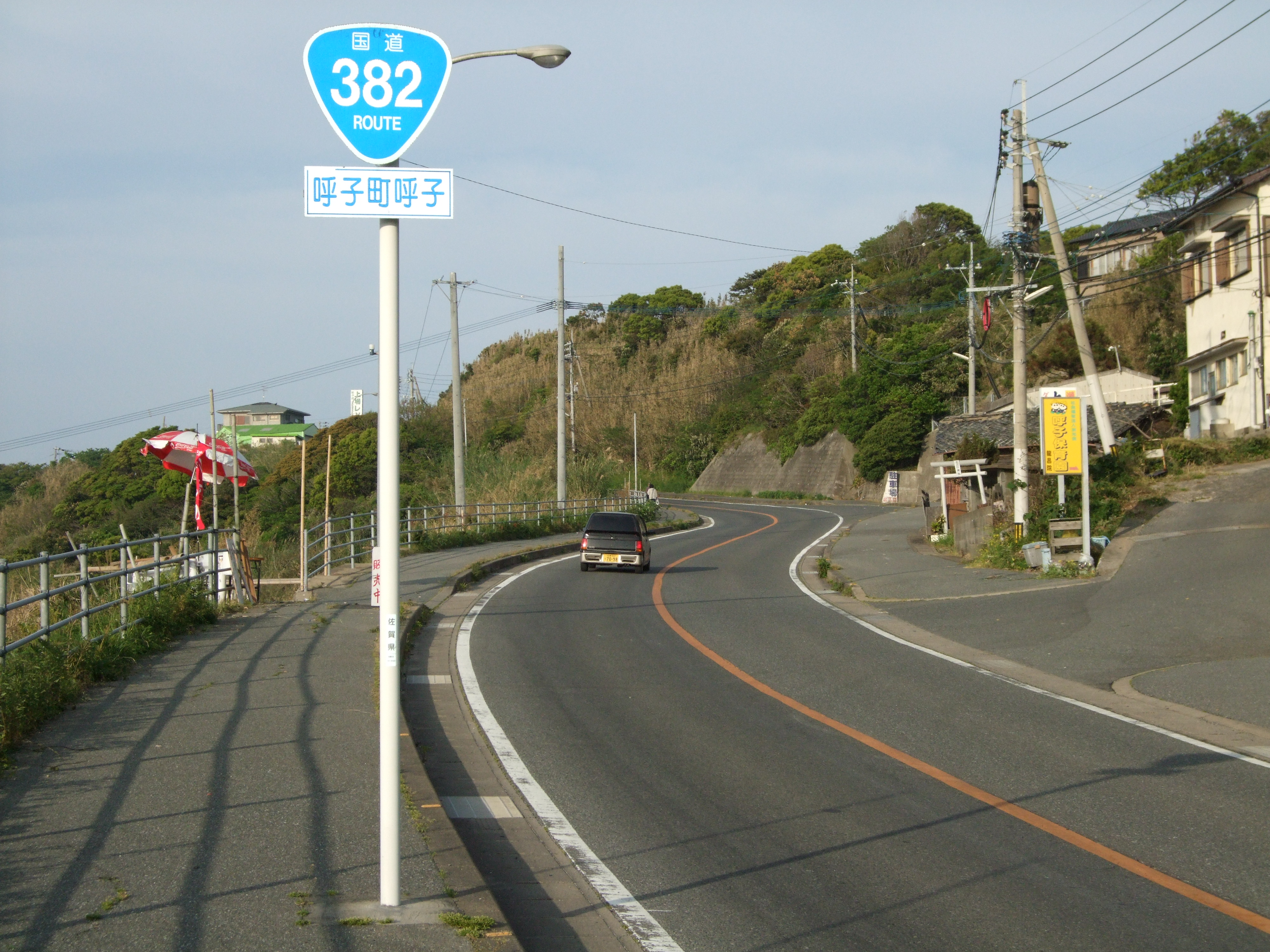
Route 382 in Yobuko, Saga Prefecture.
