= Whale mounds =

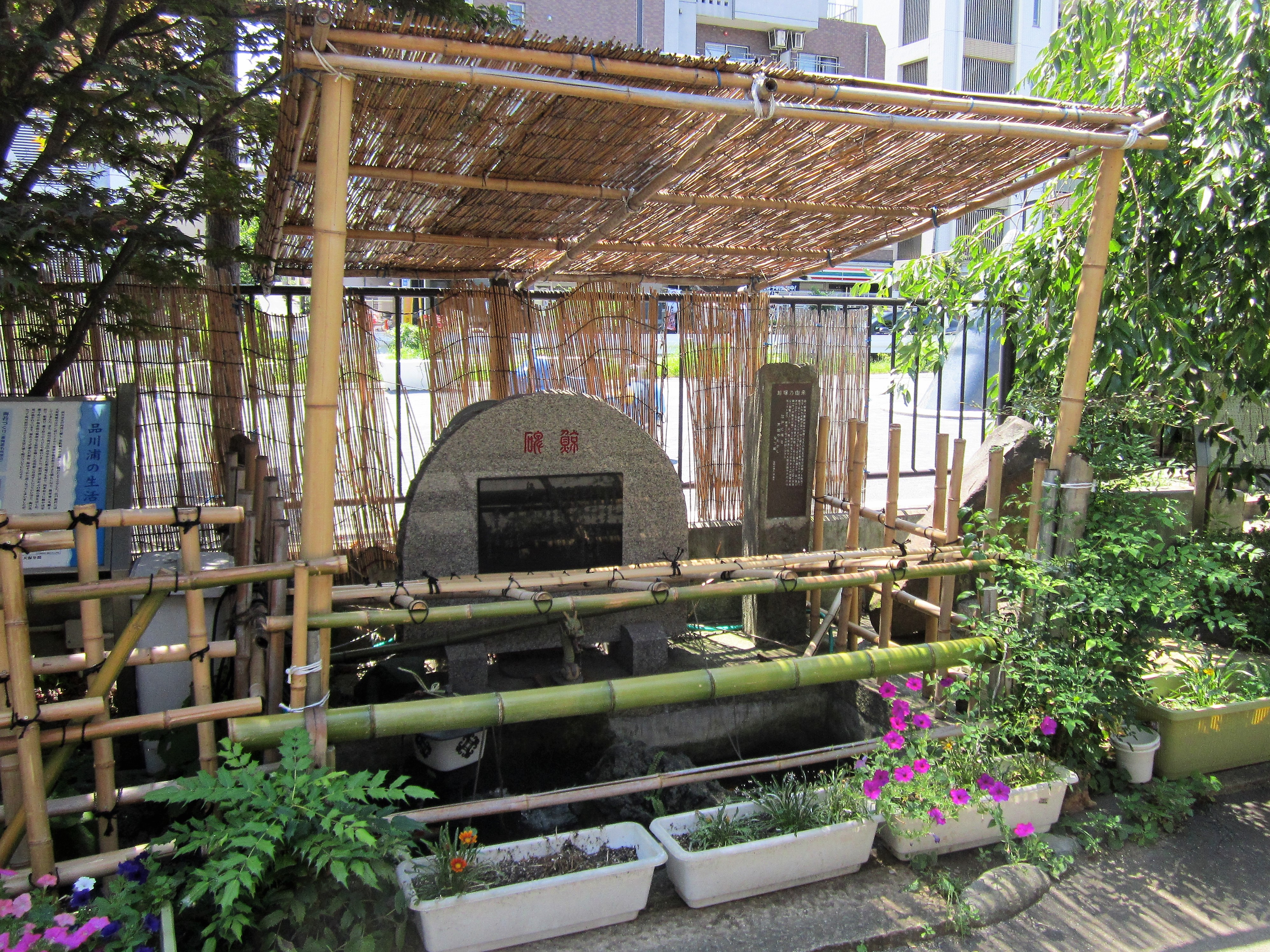
Whale mound at Toda Shrine, Shinagawa

Whale mounds (鯨塚, Kujira Tsuga) are mounds dedicated to whales that have been washed up on the shore, a custom unique to Japan.

== Overview ==
Mounds are created to remember Cetacean stranding, a type of whale that was hunted for food and resources, and to show appreciation for the area being saved and enriched. Whales were considered gods and some were called Ebisu, so they were enshrined to prevent them from becoming angry gods after they died on the shore or were hunted. These mounds can be found at Toda Shrine in Shinagawa, Tokyo and Whale Shrine in Miyake-jima, Tokyo.

After the establishment of organized whaling after the Edo period, there are also mounds built as memorials and thanksgivings in areas where Whaling was a livelihood, such as the Ryujima area near Ukishima Shrine in Chiba Prefecture and Taiji.

Because the arrival of whales coincides with the arrival of fish, whales were thought to have spiritual power and were used as fishing guides. For this reason, the whale, in the form of Ebisu, was enshrined as a god of fishing to bring good fortune to fishermen and as a sea god to pray for safety at sea.

In the same way, whale graves and monuments exist in areas where whaling has been a livelihood since ancient times, as well as passive and accidental whaling, and when combined with whale mounds, there are about 100 of them in Japan.

== Examples ==
They are found throughout the coastal areas of Japan. They vary in form, some are Stone Monuments, Towers, Shrines (wooden or stone), and some are just mounds of rocks placed on top of the bones of some of the remains, heaped with earth.

=== Tohoku ===
The following is an example from Miyagi Prefecture, Kesennuma and Karakuwa.

It is said that one day during a storm, two white whales carried a sinking ship to shore, supporting it from both sides. Since then, the people of Karakuwa have not eaten whale for generations.
In the precincts of Misaki Shrine in Karakuwa, there are several stone monuments of "whale mounds" where whales were sacrificed. This is not the origin of the aforementioned tradition, but a remnant of the time when whale fishing was practiced. It is thought that the aforementioned folklore was born as an interpretation of the whale mounds after whale fishing ceased.

=== Kanto ===
There are several whale mounds in the southern part of the Bōsō Peninsula in Chiba Prefecture.

- In Kyonan-cho, Chiba Prefecture, whaling was practiced from the Edo period to the Meiji period by the Daigo family and others, and one stone shrine was built per year at Bensaiten in Itaigaya.
- Whaling was also practiced in Otohama, Shirahama-cho, Minamibōsō-shi, Chiba Prefecture, from the Edo period to the Meiji period, and a whale mound was built around 1871 for fishermen to pray for safety before going fishing.
- A whale mound for mourning the whales caught in 1896 remains at Choshoji Temple in Senda, Chikura-cho, Minamiboso City, Chiba Prefecture
- A whale mound was built around 1871 to pray for the safety of fishermen before their departure.
- There is a whale mound in Nagano Prefecture Saku City. In the past, whales came up to the Chikuma River in now Saku City, Nagano. In places where there was little water, the whale would block the river by lying on its side, and when water accumulated, it would rise at once. It is said that the whale was stopped by the inhabitants of the lower prefecture and its head was enshrined as Goshintai. For some reason, there are many legends of whales in the Saku area, which is far from the sea.
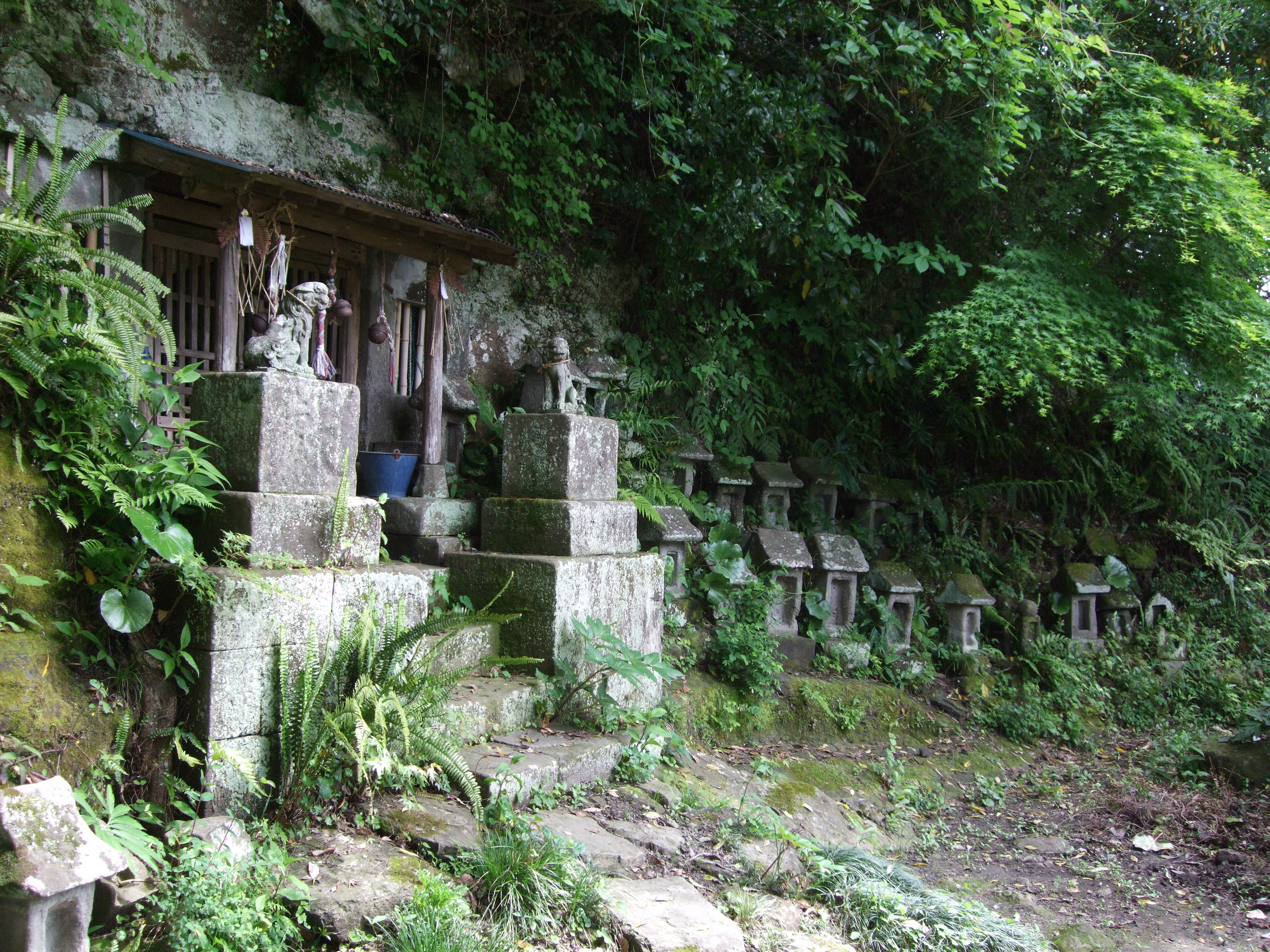
Itaigaya Benten (god of wealth, music, eloquence and water)

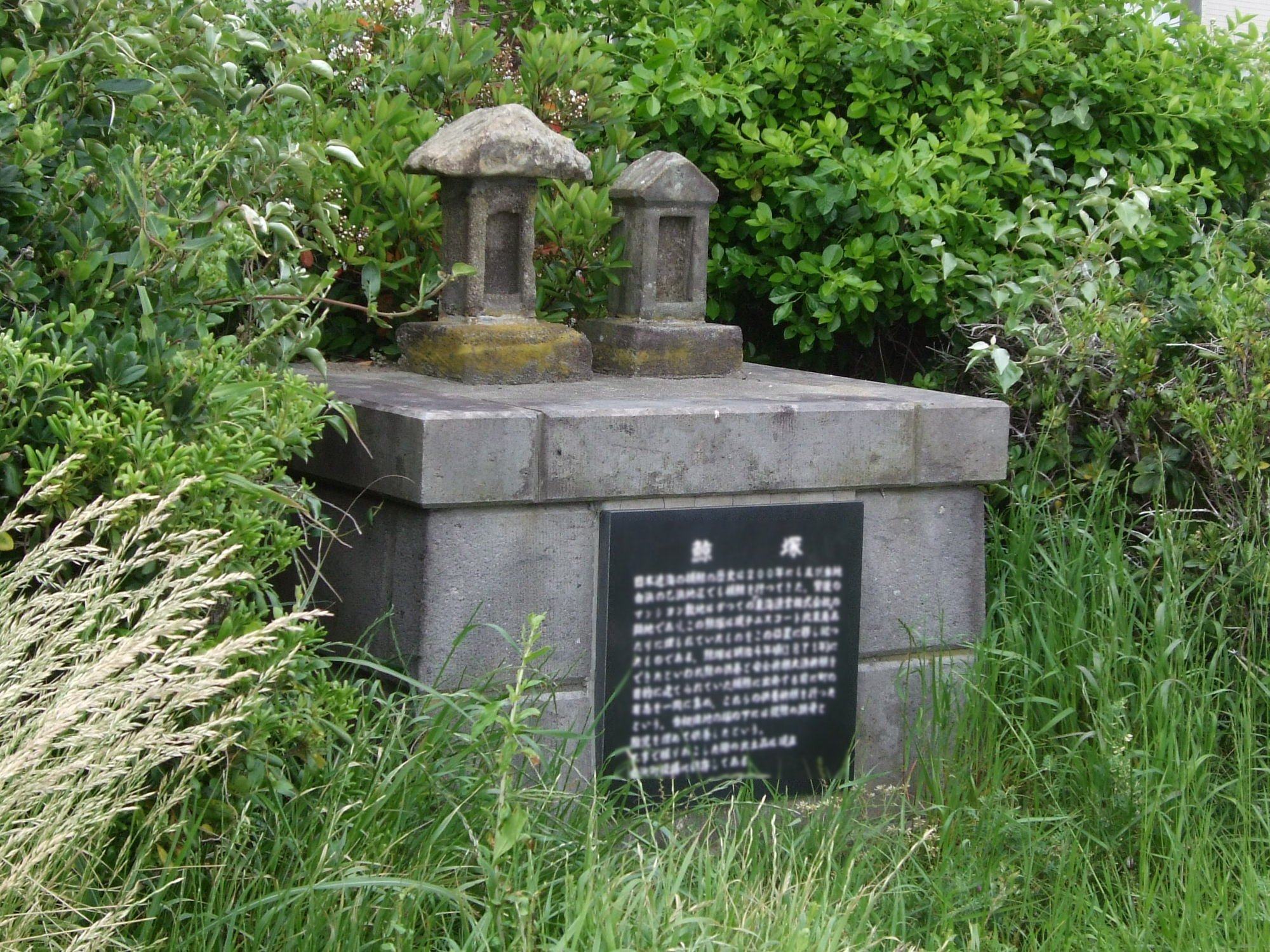
Whale Mound at Otohama

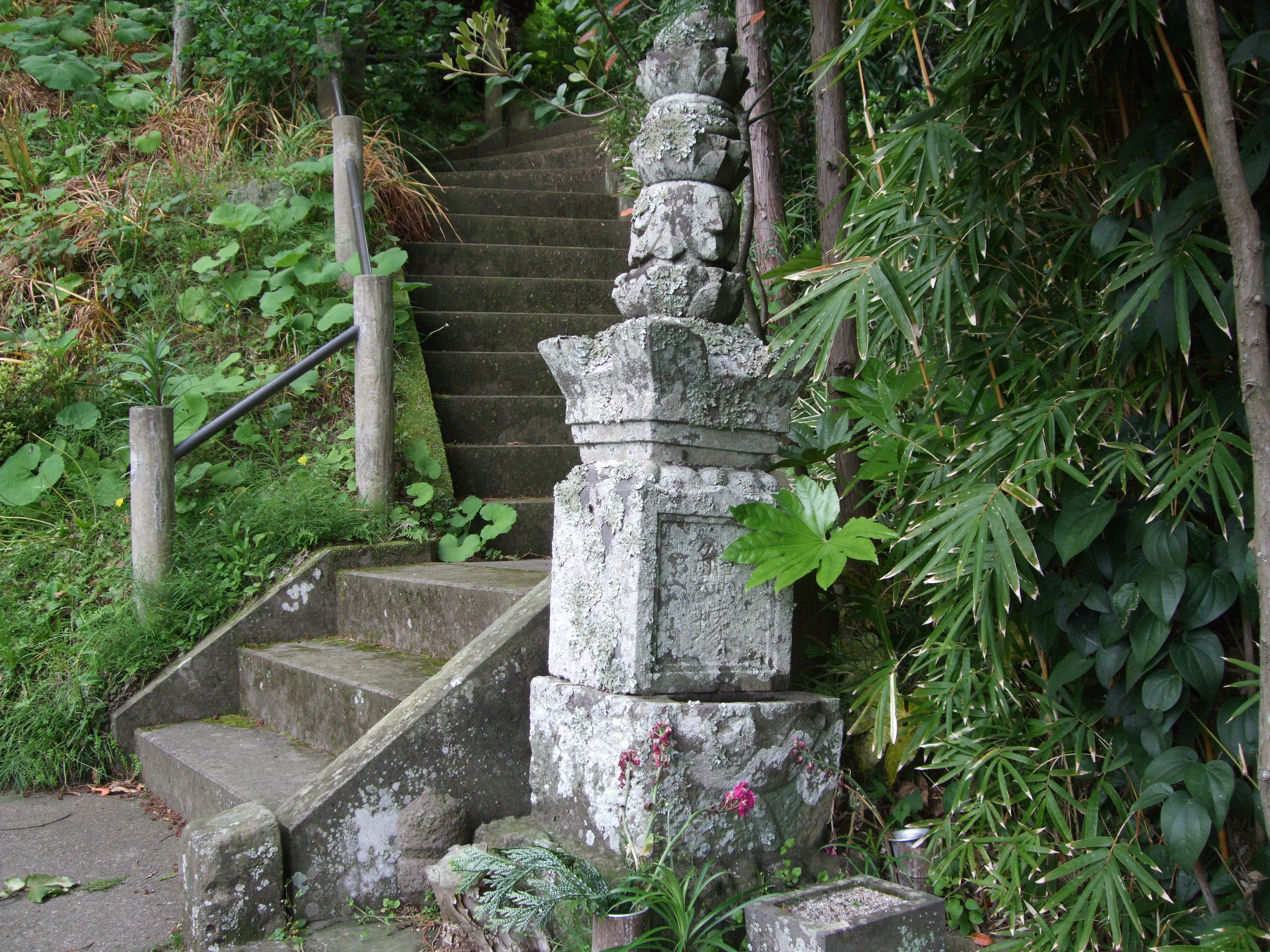
Whale Mound at Chojoji Temple

== Whale Shrines ==
Whale shrines are secular names for shrines that are closely related to whaling, such as shrines where mounds are built in gratitude or remembrance of whales, or where the remains of whales are enshrined as Goshintai, or where the act of whaling itself is regarded as a ritual and Belief.

=== Suwa Shrine ===
In Nagasaki Prefecture, Suwa Shrine is located in Nagasaki City, and is dedicated to the Nagasaki Kunchi, an event that imitates whaling. For details, see Nagasaki Kunchi.

=== Hachiojigu ===
Kōchi Prefecture, Kami, Kōchi, Tosayamada, Kōchi. It was originally built in 1469 (the first year of Bunmei) in the former Meiji village of Hachioji, with the spirit of a branch of the Hachioji Palace in Omi. The shrine was moved to its present location in 1640 (Kan'ei17), where it became the Ujigami of the Ukitsu clan, a whaling group that has continued since the Edo period. Although it is a shrine, a whale rank is dedicated to it.

=== Whale Shrine ===
Tokyo Miyake Village, Akorasagahama. It has no official name, and is called only Whale Shrine. During the Tenpo era, Miyakejima was suffering from Famine and was on the verge of a crisis when in 1832 (the third year of the Tenpo era), a "stray whale" arrived and after an inspection by the authorities, the whale was sold and divided among five villages. The whale was divided among the five villages and they were saved from starvation. In gratitude, the bones of the whale were buried and a shrine was built.

=== Whale Palace ===
Nagano Prefecture Minamisaku-gun Sakuho Town has a whale shrine in Shimohata. Once upon a time, a whale came up the Chikuma River, and the residents of Shimohata stopped it, saying, "It's rare for a whale to come up to this place. Legend has it that they built a shrine to worship it. For some reason, there are many whale legends in this area far from the sea.

== Whalebone Torii ==
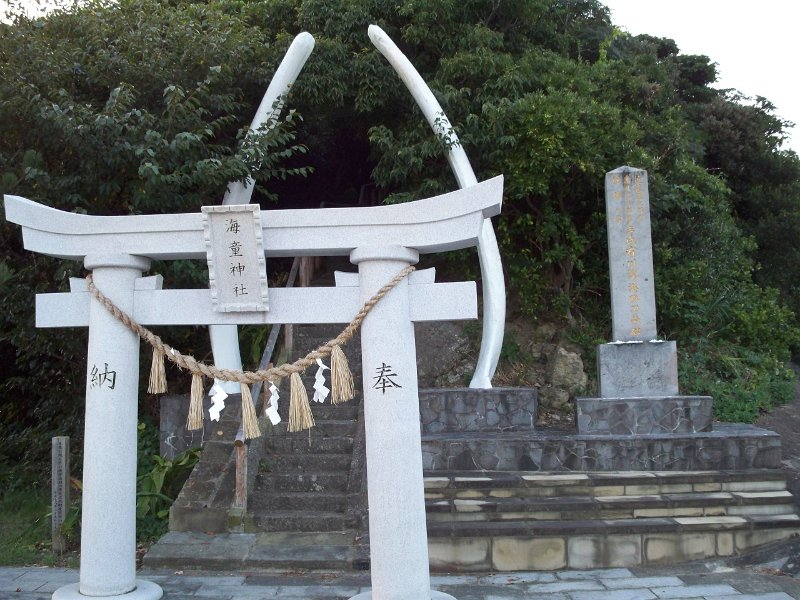
Whalebone Torii gate behind a traditional Torii gate

A whalebone torii is a torii in which the torii of the shrine is made of whale bones (mainly ribs).

The oldest one in Japan is the torii of the Ebisu Shrine (Note: Separate from Ebisu Shrine (Taiji Town)) in Taiji Town, Wakayama Prefecture. This is mentioned in Ihara Saikaku's "Nihon Eitaigura" published in 1688 (Jōkyō5): "In the village of Taiji, Ominato, Kiiro, the wife and children sing. This place is prosperous and Wakamatsu village is standing. According to records, the current torii is the third generation, and it is unknown what it was made of before that. According to records, the current torii is the third generation, and it is not known what it was made of before that. These are all the whale torii gates that exist in Japan today, but there is also a Cape Eluanbi Shrine in Eluanbi, the southernmost point of Taiwan under Japanese rule at the time. There were also whale torii gates at three other shrines: Fudato Ebisu Shrine in Sakhalin, and Shikotan Shrine on Shikotan Island in the Northern Territories. Each of these five locations is either directly or indirectly related to whaling (such as whaling bases).

== See also ==
- Whale
  - Ebisu (mythology)
- Whaling
  - Whale conservation
- Mound
