= Matsurokoku =

Country mentioned in ancient Chinese histories

map illustrating the path from the Daifeng commandery to Yamatai, and its distances in the Wajinden.

Matsurokoku (末盧國, Matsurokoku / Matsurakoku) is one of the countries described in Wajinden, Liangshu and History of the Northern Dynasties, and is the first place where Wei, the first place in Wa where emissaries from Tsushima and Iki landed on the mainland.

Matsurokoku (末盧國) is one of the countries described in Wajinden, Liangshu and History of the Northern Dynasties, and is the first Japanese land where the envoys of Wei landed on the mainland via Tsushima and Iki. The prevailing theory is that it is a phonetic transcription of Matsura-gun (anciently "Matsura," Matsura no Kuni no Miyatsuko).

== Outline ==
Suerokoku is located in the former Hizen Province Saga Karatsu City in the Matsuura region near the sound Nabatake Site, in the watersheds of the Matsuura River, Handa River and Uki River, and in Matsurokoku and Ukikunden Site in the watersheds of the Handa and Uki Rivers, most researchers assume that these sites were included in the central region. From Yobuko on the northern tip of the Kitamatsuura Peninsula, it is about 28 km to Iki, 73 km between Iki and Tsushima, about 75 km between Tsushima and Geoje Island in Korea (about 93 km between Tsushima and Busan), and Wajinden, each of which is 1,000 ri. Therefore, to be consistent with the distance from Iki, the current names of Sasebo City in Nagasaki Prefecture, Fukuoka City, Munakata City, and Onga-gun.

The size of the area is about that of a commandery or several counties under the Ritsuryo system, indicating that a political power had been formed. Yobuko, located at the northern tip of the Kitamatsuura Peninsula, was the center of transportation to the continent under the Ritsuryo system, with a stone tomb, a jar coffin, a jar coffin tomb, a box-shaped sarcophagus, and a stone tomb. The site was once controversial for the discovery of Jomon traits, including extractions and Jomon traits.

Because it corresponds to "Suera prefecture (Matsura no Agata)" and "Matsuura prefecture (Matsuura no Agata)" in " Nihon Shoki ", it is compared to Karatsu city in Saga Prefecture

== Description in the Wajinden ==
In "Wajinden", it is written as follows. There are 4,000 houses, and the mountains and seas are all in the same place. The plants and trees are thick, and you can't see the people in front of you. The water is deep and shallow, and everyone sinks. （There are more than 4,000 houses, and they are located in the mountains and seas, and the plants and trees are so thick that they do not see anyone before them. (Oyi) The people went on through the reed beds so overgrown that they could not see the people ahead of them. The inhabitants caught fish and abalone as seafarers.

== The Ukikunden Site ==
The Ukikunden site is a settlement from the Late Jomon and Early to Middle Yayoi Periods, with shell middens, and from the Late Jomon to the Early Yayoi Period (Itatsuki-I earthenware), they built stone tombs on the mountain behind them, and from the Early Yayoi Period (Itatsuki-II earthenware) to the Middle Yayoi Period, they built jar coffins on the flat. 129 pieces have been investigated and 150 pieces have been excavated. A small number of child jar coffins are included in this number. In this jar coffin tomb, a multi-buttoned mirror, 9 fine bronze swords, 5 fine bronze contradistances, 2 fine bronze grenades, copper bracelets, grapeshi, glass tubes, and glass beads were found. Currently, the Kagami area has the largest amount of bronze artifacts imported from the continent found in Japan. (Note: 岡崎敬「多鈕細文鏡－唐津市宇木汲田遺跡」)。

== Sakura-baba Ruins ==
This site is located between Hirano-cho and Yamashita-cho in Karatsu City, in the southwest of the dune area north of the Karatsu city center. The jar coffin at this site is from the late Yayoi period, and surveys and excavations of this site were conducted by Okazaki Takashi in 1945 and 1946, and by Sugihara Shosuke in 1955. 1944 (1944) A jar coffin with a jointed mouth was excavated during the construction of an air-raid shelter. Two square rectangular mirrors, a bronze bracelet with hooks, an iron sword, a small glass bead, and a bronze spear were found in the coffin. Human bones were also apparently excavated, but they have been buried back. These artifacts are now in the collection of the Saga Prefectural Museum. In 1955, a jar coffin with a stone lid and three types of earthenware were excavated.

== See also ==
- Nakoku
- Itokoku
- Ukikunden
