= Saikai National Park =

National Park in Kyūshū, Japan

- 西海国立公園
- IUCN category II (national park)
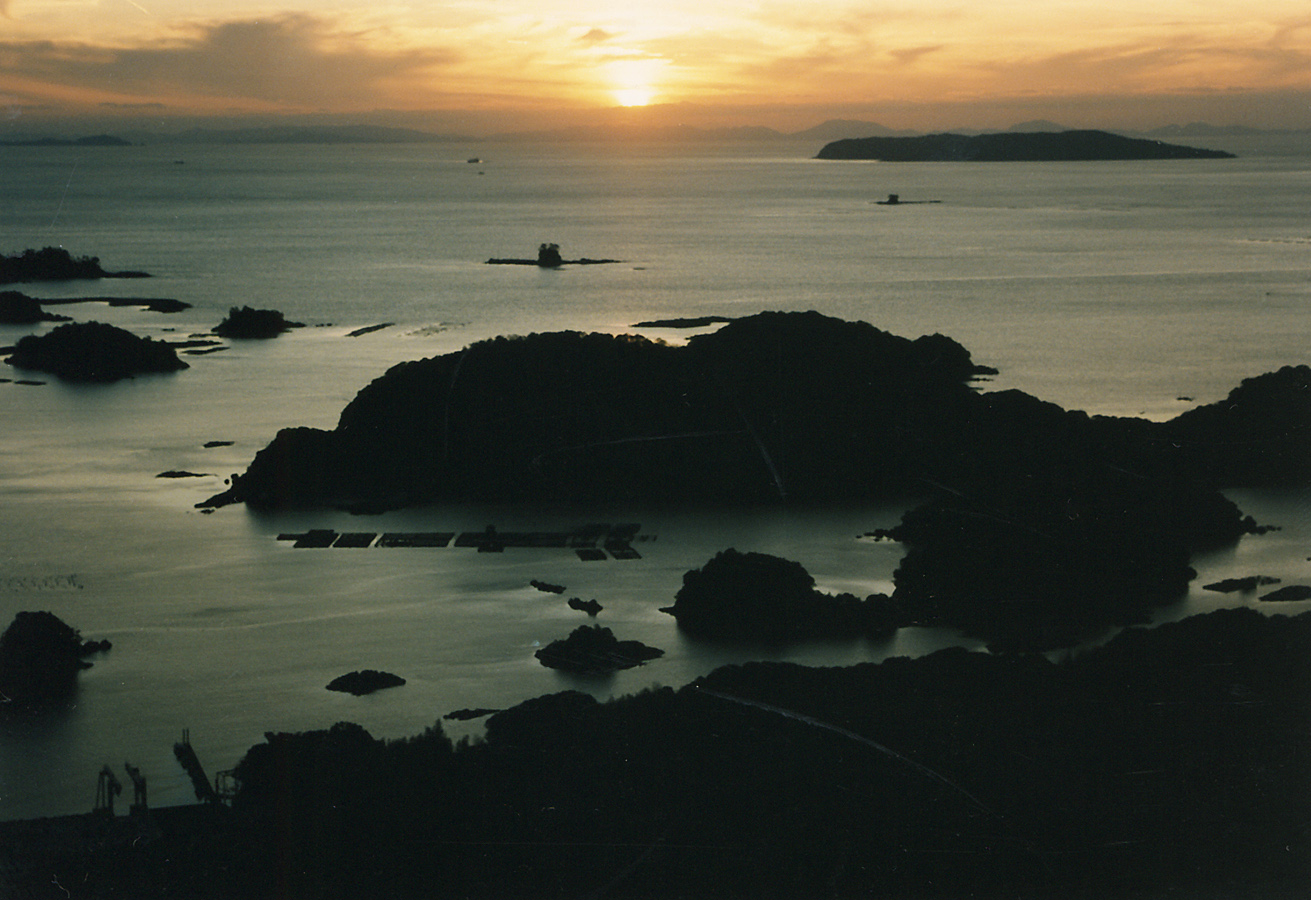
- Kujūku Islands

- Location within Nagasaki Prefecture Location within Japan
- Location: Nagasaki prefecture, Japan
- Nearest city: Sasebo, Hirado, Fukue
- Coordinates: 32°40′11″N 128°37′38″E
- Area: 246.46 km^{2} (95.16 sq mi)
- Established: March 16, 1955
- Governing body: Ministry of the Environment (Japan)

Saikai National Park (西海国立公園, Saikai Kokuritsu Kōen) is a marine national park located in Nagasaki prefecture of northwest Kyūshū, Japan. It consists of the coastal regions of Matsuura Peninsula, extending northward from the port city of Sasebo and encompasses the Kujūku Islands, with over 200 islands to the west, Hirado Peninsula further west, and the coastlines of the Gotō Islands to the far west.

== History ==
Efforts to create Saikai National Park began in 1949, at the initiative of then-Sasebo mayor Masasuke Nagata. The area encompassing the present park mostly fell within the territory of the former Sasebo Naval District of the Imperial Japanese Navy, and was regarded as a strategic zone in which photography was strictly prohibited, and visitation by outsiders was discouraged. After the surrender of Japan and dissolution of the Japanese military, Mayor Nagata saw the possibilities of tourism to boost the local economy, and petitioned the Diet of Japan, aided by studies made by Tokyo University, Kyoto University, Nagasaki University and a promotional campaign made by Mainichi Shimbun newspaper.

The campaign was ultimately successful, and Sakai National Park was established on March 16, 1955. It was the 18th national park to be created in Japan.

== Geography and geology ==
This park consists of more than 400 islands, large and small, including Hirado, the Kujukushima Islands, and the Gotō Islands. Hirado retains the historic sites of its erstwhile port for foreign trade. The Gotō Islands have interesting inlets and high cliffs as well as rare volcanic formations.

== Wildlife and ecology ==
The park is valued for its scenery and as an ecological support for the fishing grounds in the area. The mild climate and warm currents result in semi-tropical vegetation, including tree ferns.

== See also ==
- List of national parks of Japan
- Kitamatsuura Peninsula
- Mount Yasumandake
