= Itazuke Site =

- 板付遺跡 (Japanese)
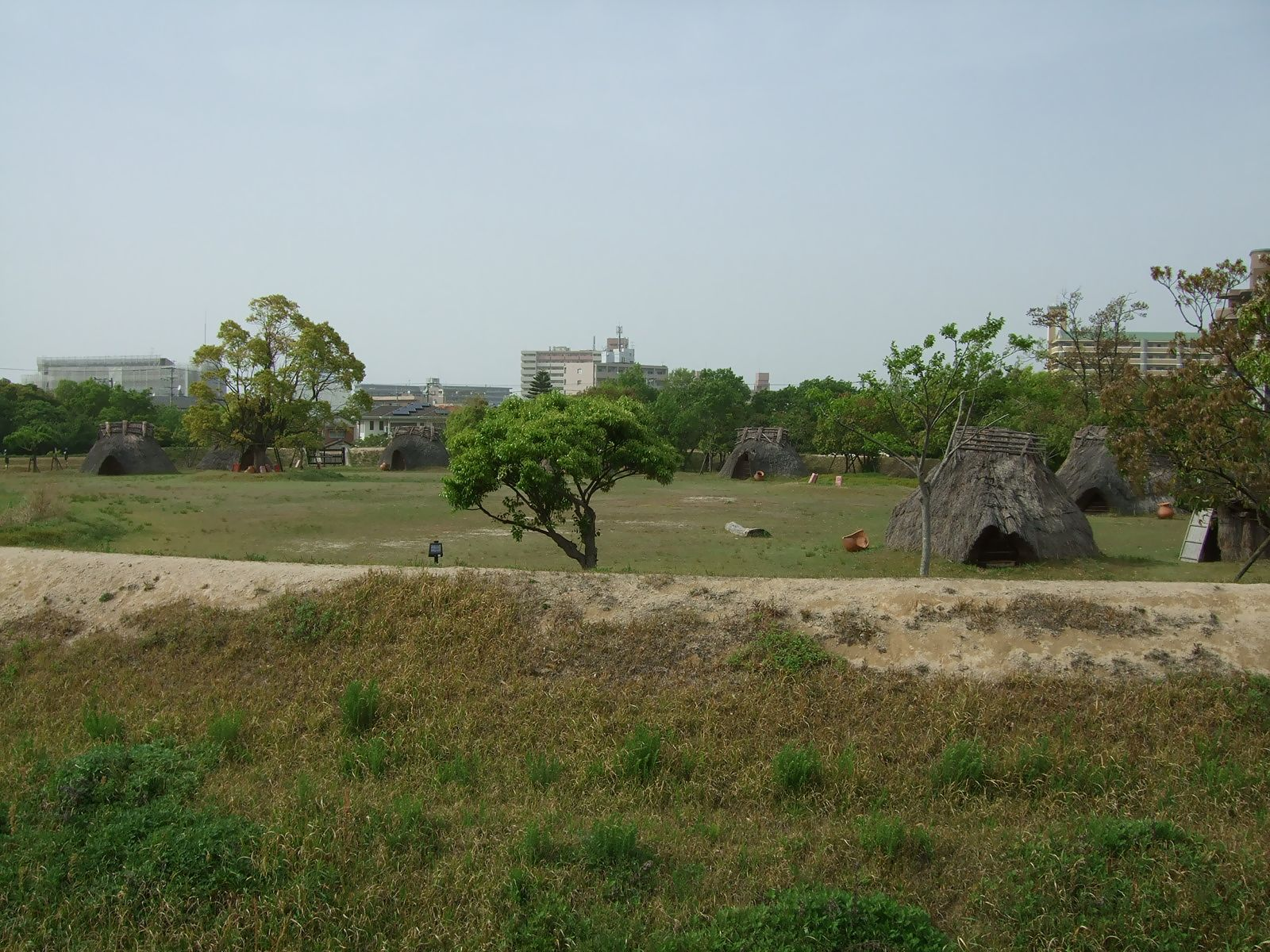
- Itazuke Site with faux pit dwellings

- Itazuke Site Itazuke Site (Japan)
- Interactive map of Itazuke Site
- 33°33′55.7″N 130°27′10.1″E
- Type: settlement
- Periods: Yayoi period
- Location: Hakata-ku, Fukuoka, Japan
- Region: Kyushu

Site notes
- Public access: Yes (park, museum)
- Website: Official website

Itazuke Site (板付遺跡, Itazuke iseki) is an archaeological site with a late Jōmon period to late Yayoi period settlement located in Hakata-ku, Fukuoka, Japan. Along with the Nabatake Site in Karatsu, Saga, it is the oldest known rice-growing village site in Japan, and is also the oldest known moated settlement. It was designated as a National Historic Site in 1976, with the area under protection expanded in several times.

== Overview ==
The Itazuke Site consists of the remains of a moated village located almost in the center of the Fukuoka plain on a plateau at an elevation of 7 to 9 meters on the west bank of the Mikasa River. The site was discovered in 1916, when several tombs from the end of the early to middle Yayoi period containing three bronze swords and three bronze halberds were discovered. Archaeological excavations have been carried out at the site almost continuously since 1951.

The traces of rice paddies and a cemetery spread over the surrounding alluvial land. The village ruins, which have an egg-shaped moat with a long diameter of 110 meters and width of up to five meters, include pit dwellings, storage holes, and wells. Remains of paddy fields from the late Jōmon period have been discovered, challenging the prevailing theory that wet rice cultivation was introduced into Japan only from the Yayoi period. Irrigation facilities such as a weir built in an irrigation canal were also found. Based on the spacing between the ridges, each section of rice field is about 400 meters, and based on the chronology of excavated Yayoi pottery, it dates from the very beginning of the Yayoi culture. In addition, bronze spears and swords were unearthed from a tomb at the site mark the first time that Yayoi pottery was accompanied by metal utensils. A bronze spear mold were also unearthed, although almost all bronze weapons which appear as grave goods from this period were believed to have been imported from the Korean Peninsula. The site also yielded pre-Yayoi pottery, human footprints, carbonized rice, stone knives, and wooden tools.

The site has been preserved as an archaeological park with re-creations of pit-style dwellings and rice fields and a museum. The site is approximately 2.1 kilometers east of Takeshita Station on the JR Kyushu Kagoshima Main Line.

== See also ==
- List of Historic Sites of Japan (Fukuoka)
