= Kujūku Islands =

Island group in Nagasaki, Japan

Coordinates: 33°10′N 129°36′E

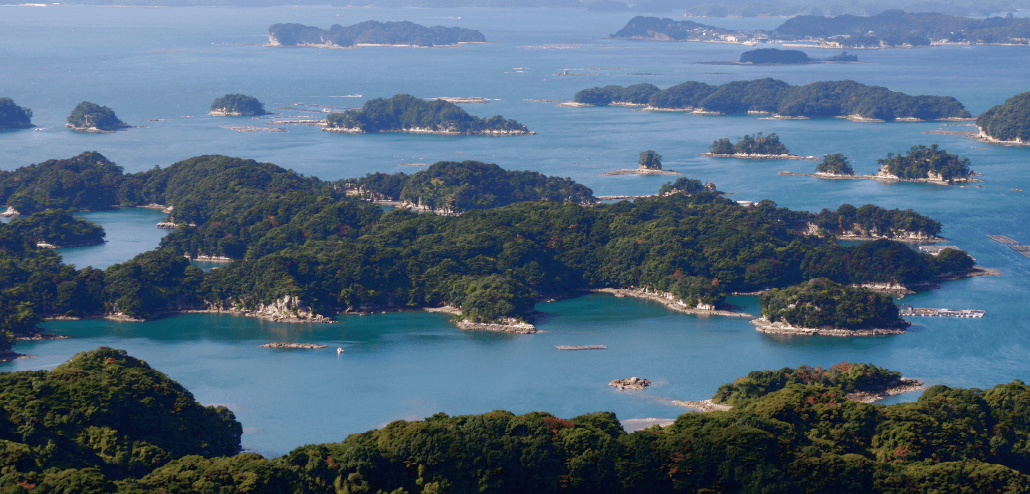
Kujūku Islands view, 2021

Kujūku Islands (九十九島, Kujūku-shima) is a group of islands ranging in the west coast of Kitamatsuura Peninsula, Nagasaki Prefecture, Japan.

The name Kujūku-shima translates to "ninety-nine islands", though the total number of the islands is formally considered to be two hundred and eight. The whole area is designated as part of Saikai National Park.

The islands are shared between the city of Sasebo and the city of Hirado, as they dot the 25 kilometres (16 mi) long saw-toothed coastline stretching between the two cities. The two biggest islands, Kuro-shima and Taka-shima, are easily accessible by ferry from the harbour of Ainoura in the north of Sasebo three times a day.

== Kuro-shima ==
Kuro-shima ("Black Island"), the biggest island covering 5.3 km^{2}, has about 650 inhabitants who are mostly the descendants of Catholics who hid here to escape persecution after the Shimabara Rebellion of 1637. The island church, Kuroshima Tenshudō, was built in 1902. It is one of the rare brick churches in Japan. It was declared an "Important National Heritage" in 1998. There are some well-preserved old houses on the island showing the traditional architecture.

Most of the island is covered by dense forest. There are a few paddy fields on Kuro-shima as well, some of them are terraces which are very rare in Japan. In the middle of the island, there is a school, an administration building and a shop. The small harbour of Kuro-shima is in the north of the island.

== Taka-shima ==
Taka-shima ("High Island"), the second largest island covering 2.6 km^{2}, has about 250 inhabitants. Its tallest mountain is 138 m.

== Gallery ==
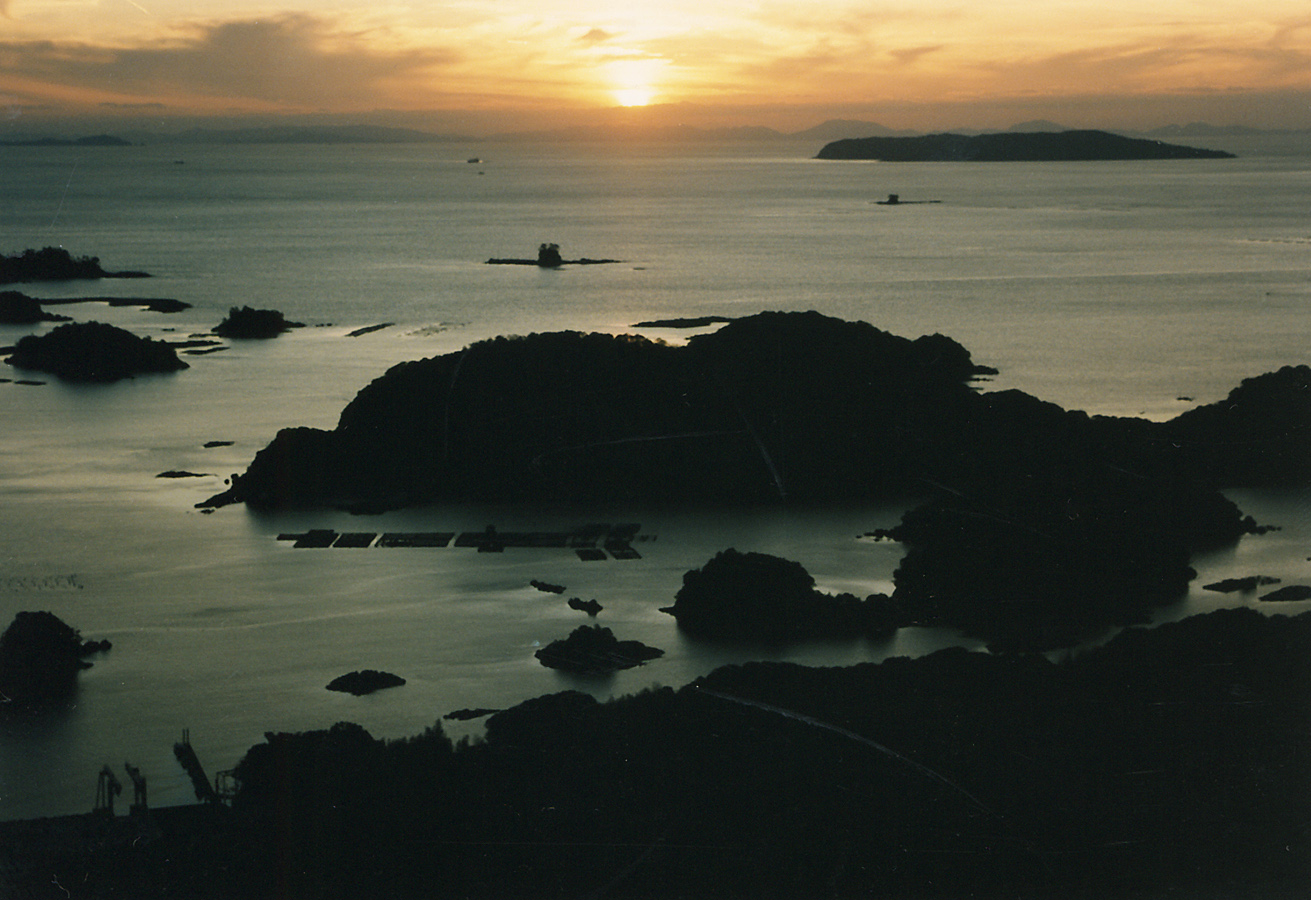
Kujūku Islands

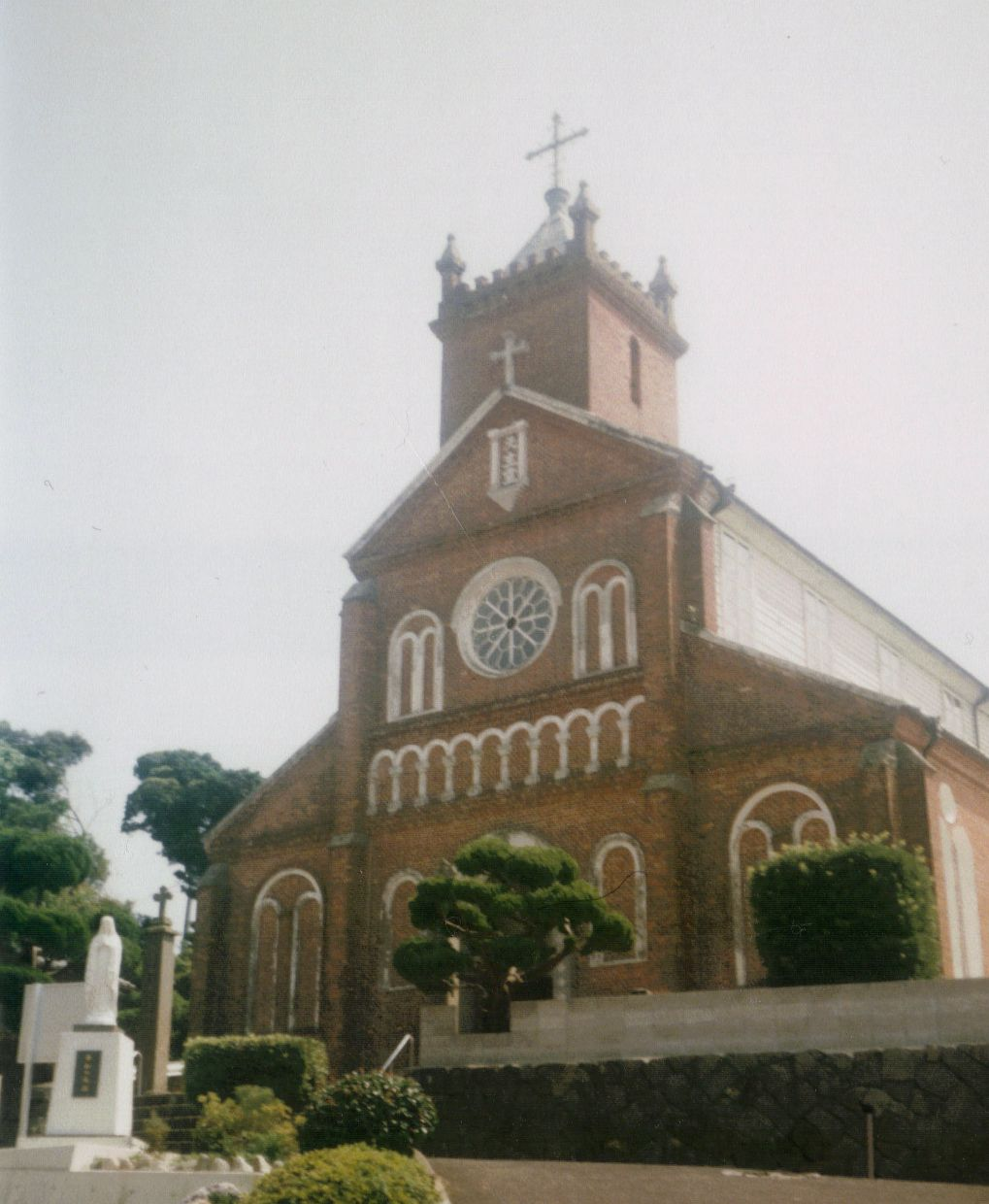
Catholic church on Kuro-shima

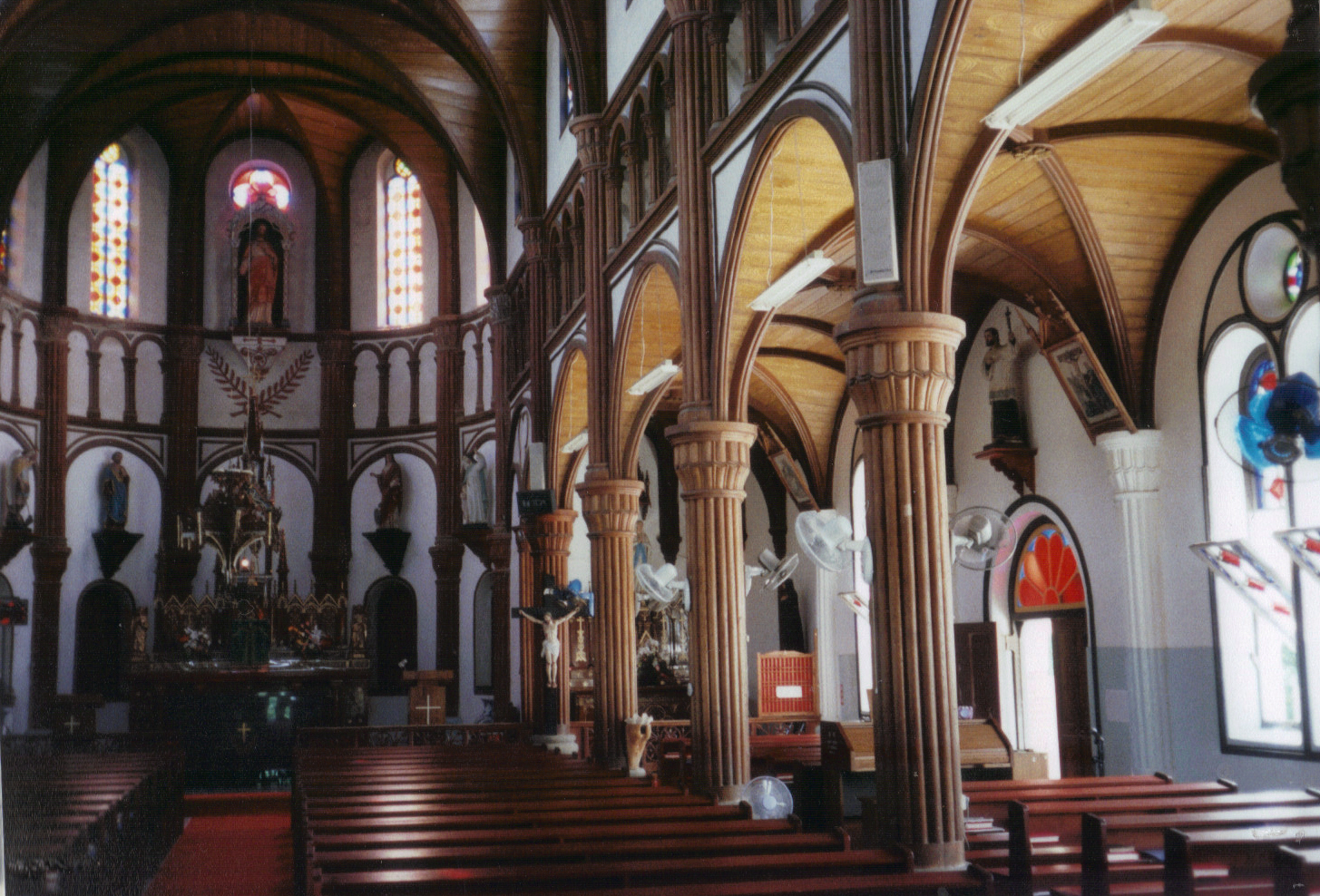
Catholic church on Kuro-shima

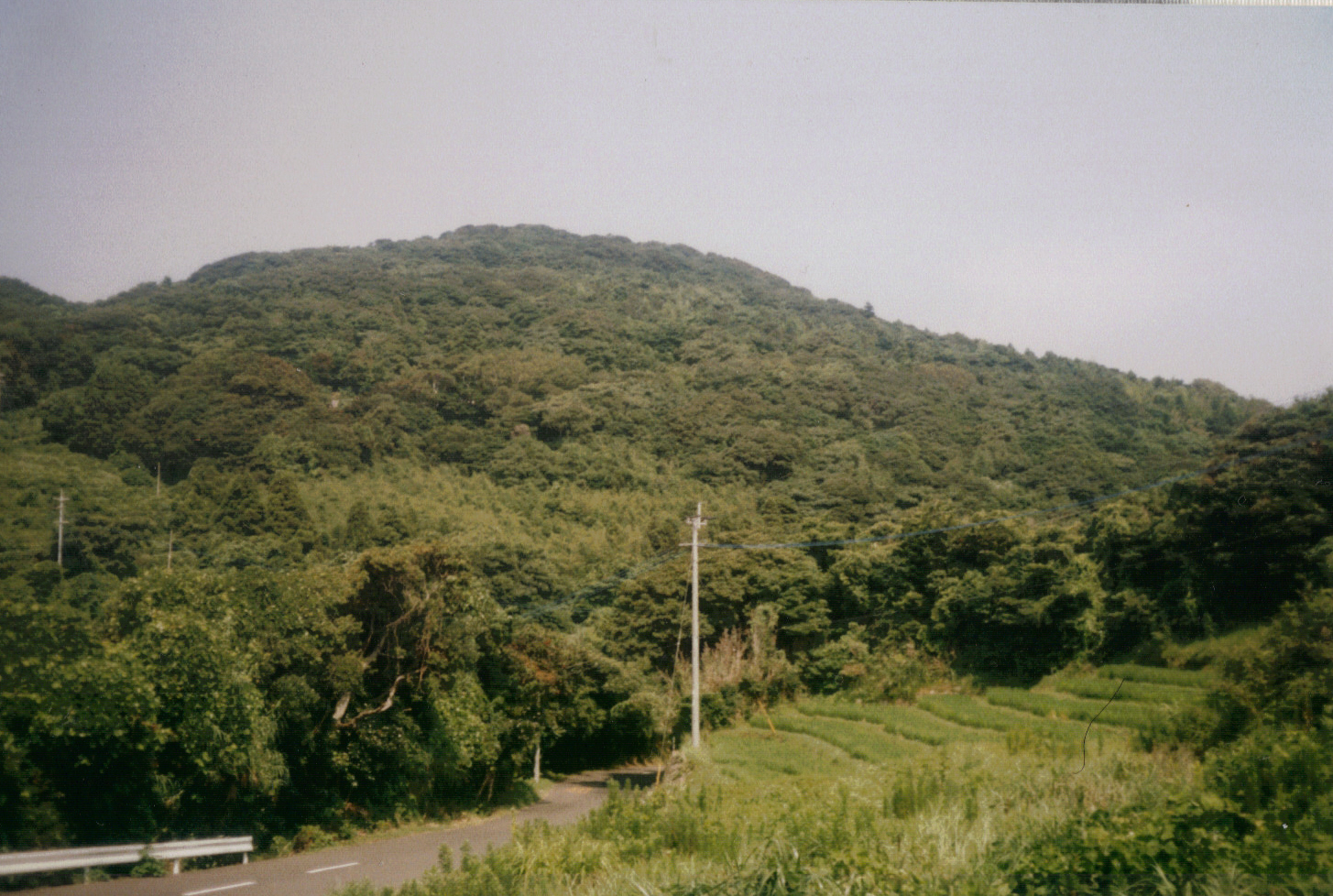
Landscape on Kuro-shima

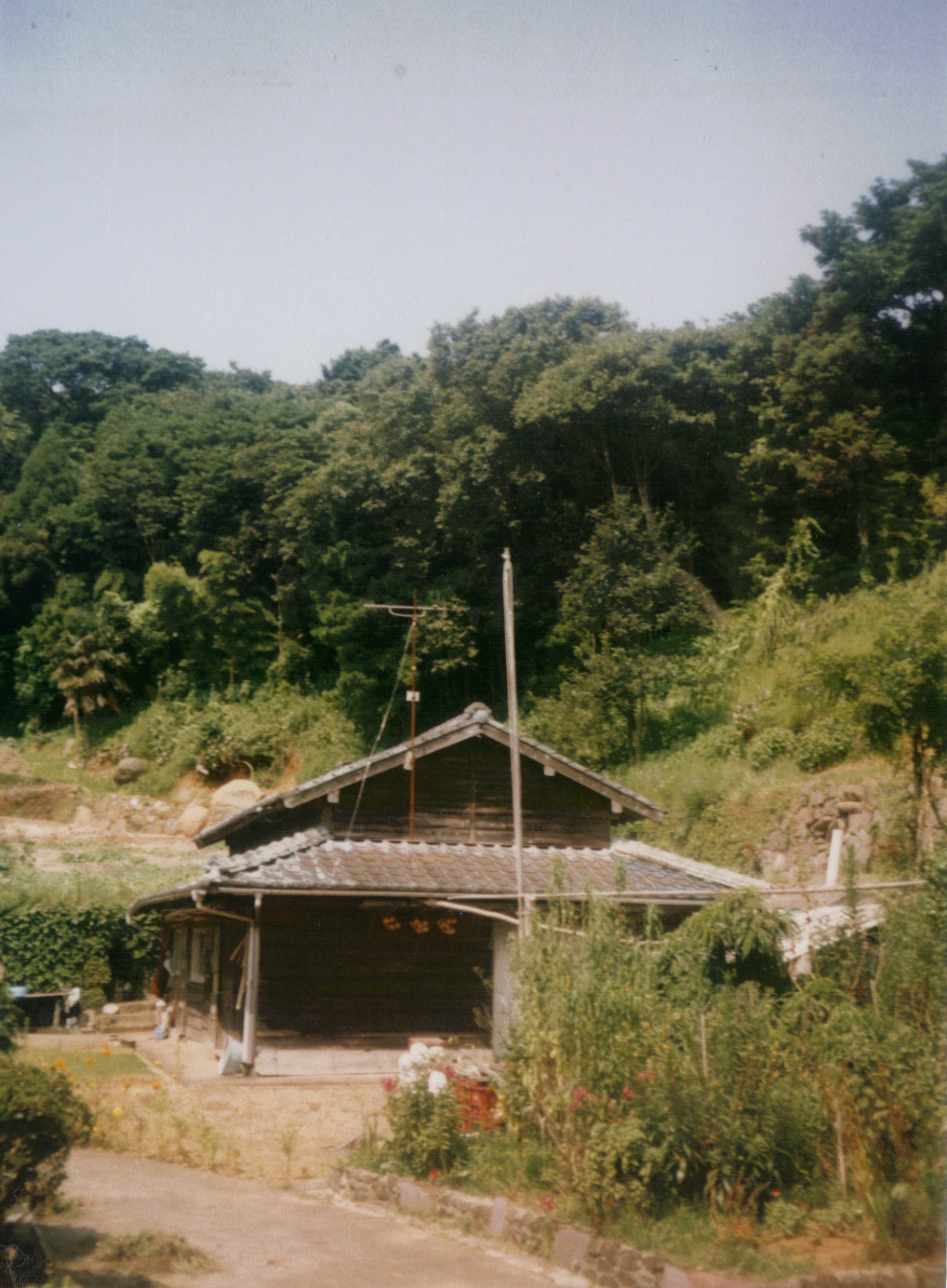
Traditional architecture on Kuro-shima

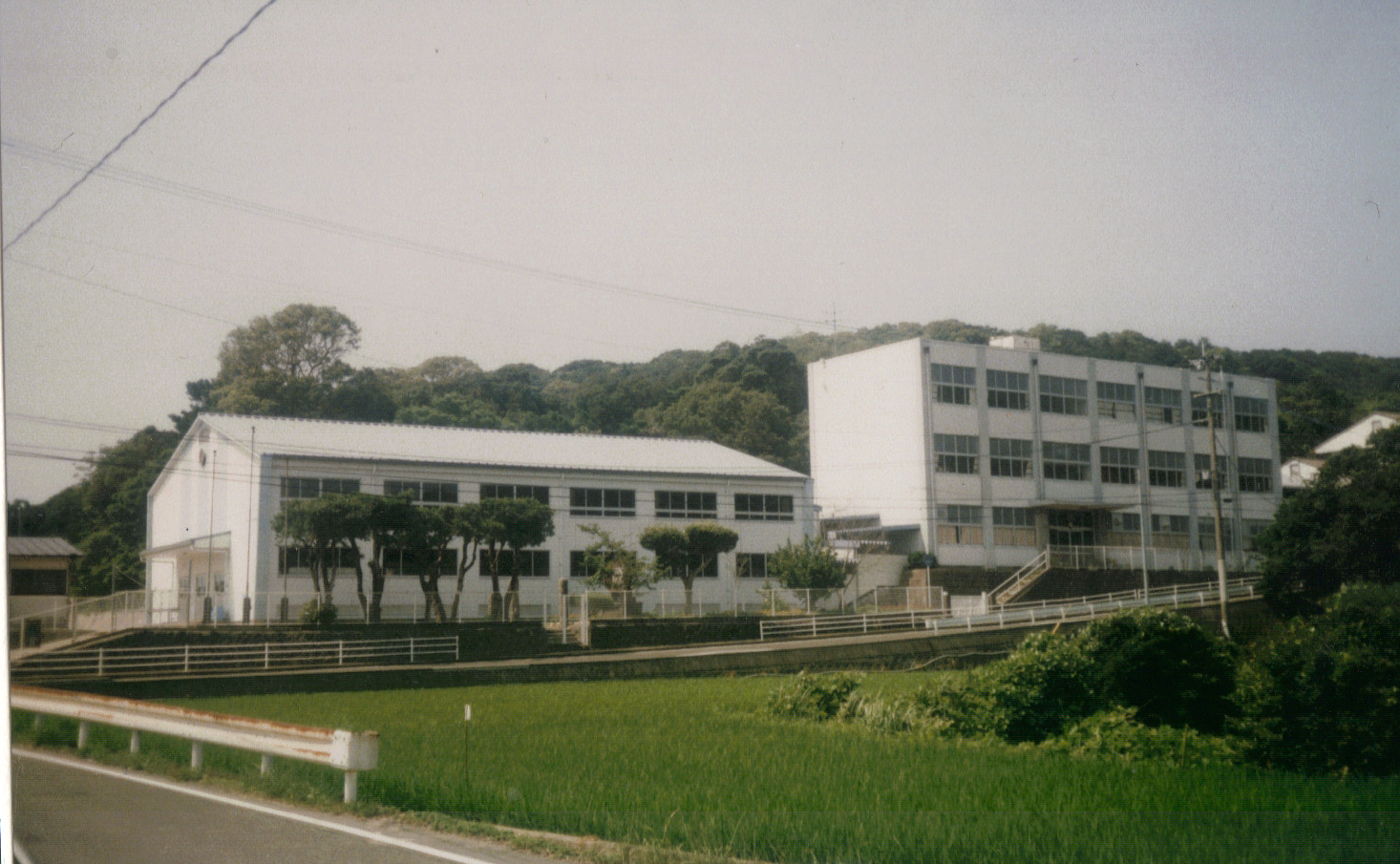
School and administration building on Kuro-shima
