= Matsuura River =

River in Japan

Coordinates: 33°27′13″N 129°58′51″E

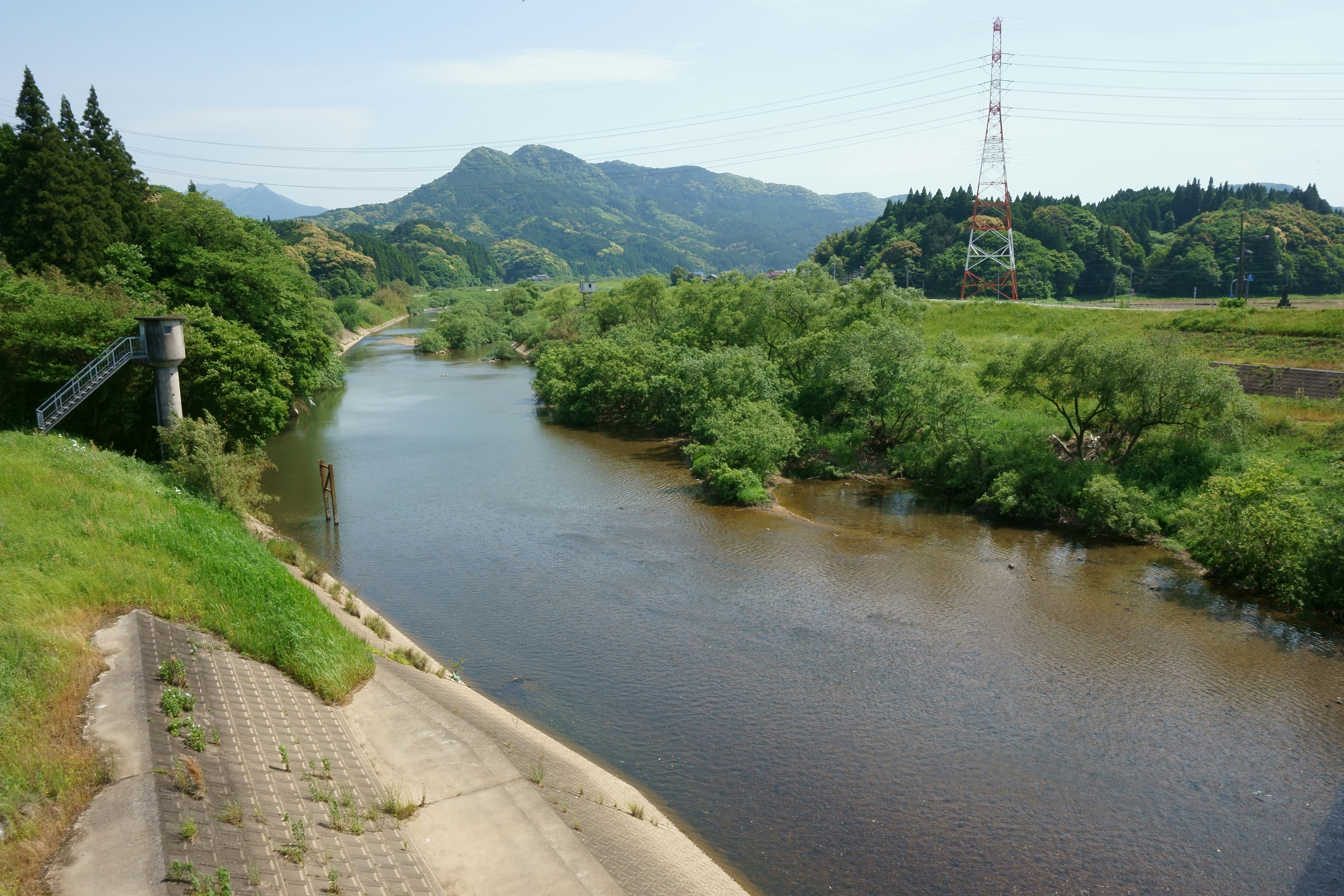

The Matsuura River is a Class A river in Japan. The river flows through the cities of Karatsu, Imari, and Takeo in Saga Prefecture in the northern part of Kyushu. It has historically had a lot of flooding risks.

== See also ==
- Matsurokoku
- Matsura-gun
