= Hokushō Prefectural Natural Park =

Park in Japan

- 北松県立自然公園
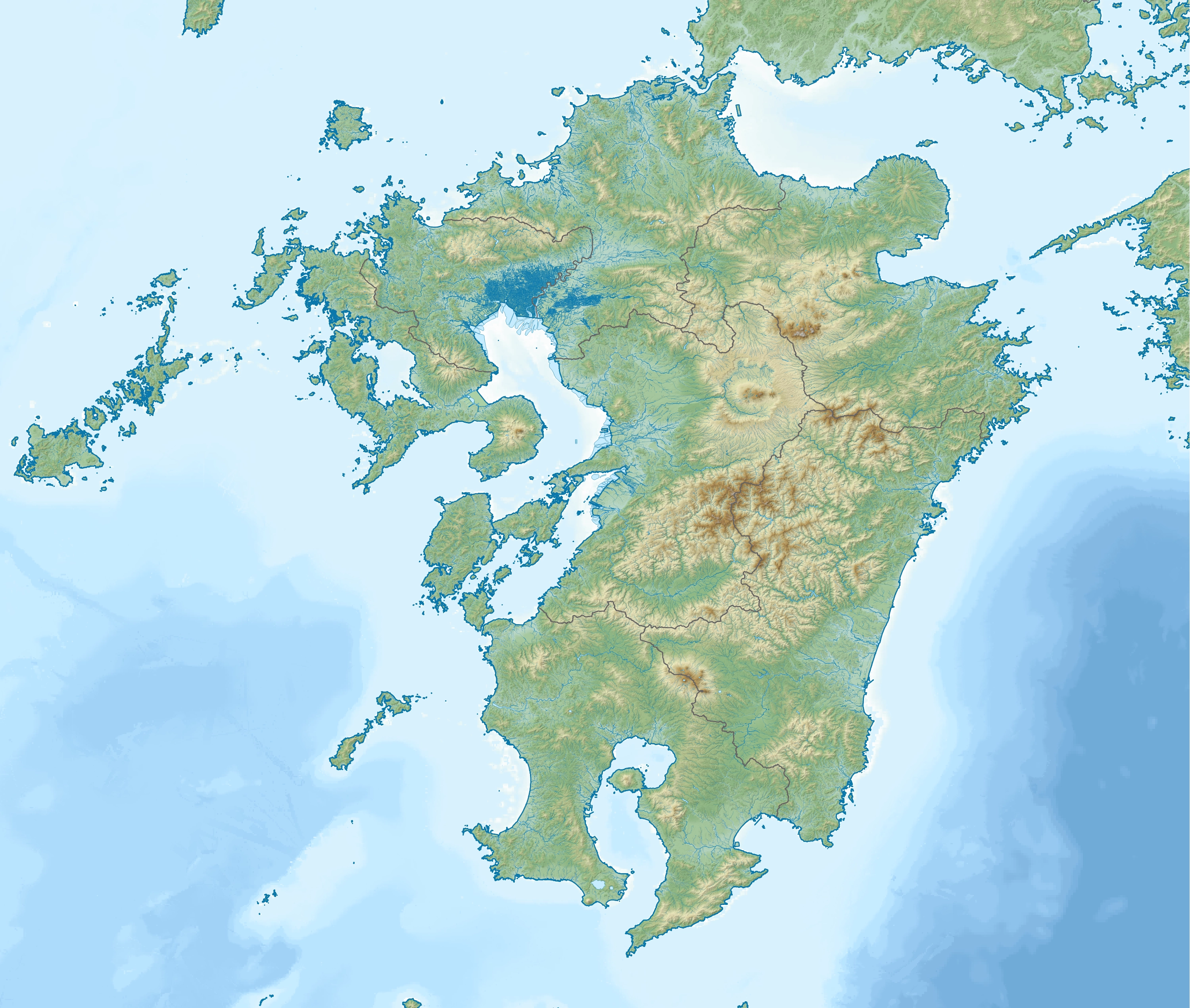
- Location within Nagasaki Prefecture Location within Kyushu Location within Japan
- Location: Nagasaki Prefecture, Japan
- Coordinates: 33.3°N 129.68°E
- Area: 35.14 km^{2} (13.57 sq mi)
- Established: 10 January 1962

Hokushō Prefectural Natural Park (北松県立自然公園, Hokushō kenritsu shizen kōen) is a Prefectural Natural Park in Nagasaki Prefecture, Japan. The park was established in 1962 and derives its name from the Kitamatsuura Peninsula.

== See also ==
- National Parks of Japan
