= Nabatake Site =

Archaeological site in Karatsu, Saga, Japan

- 菜畑遺跡 (Japanese)
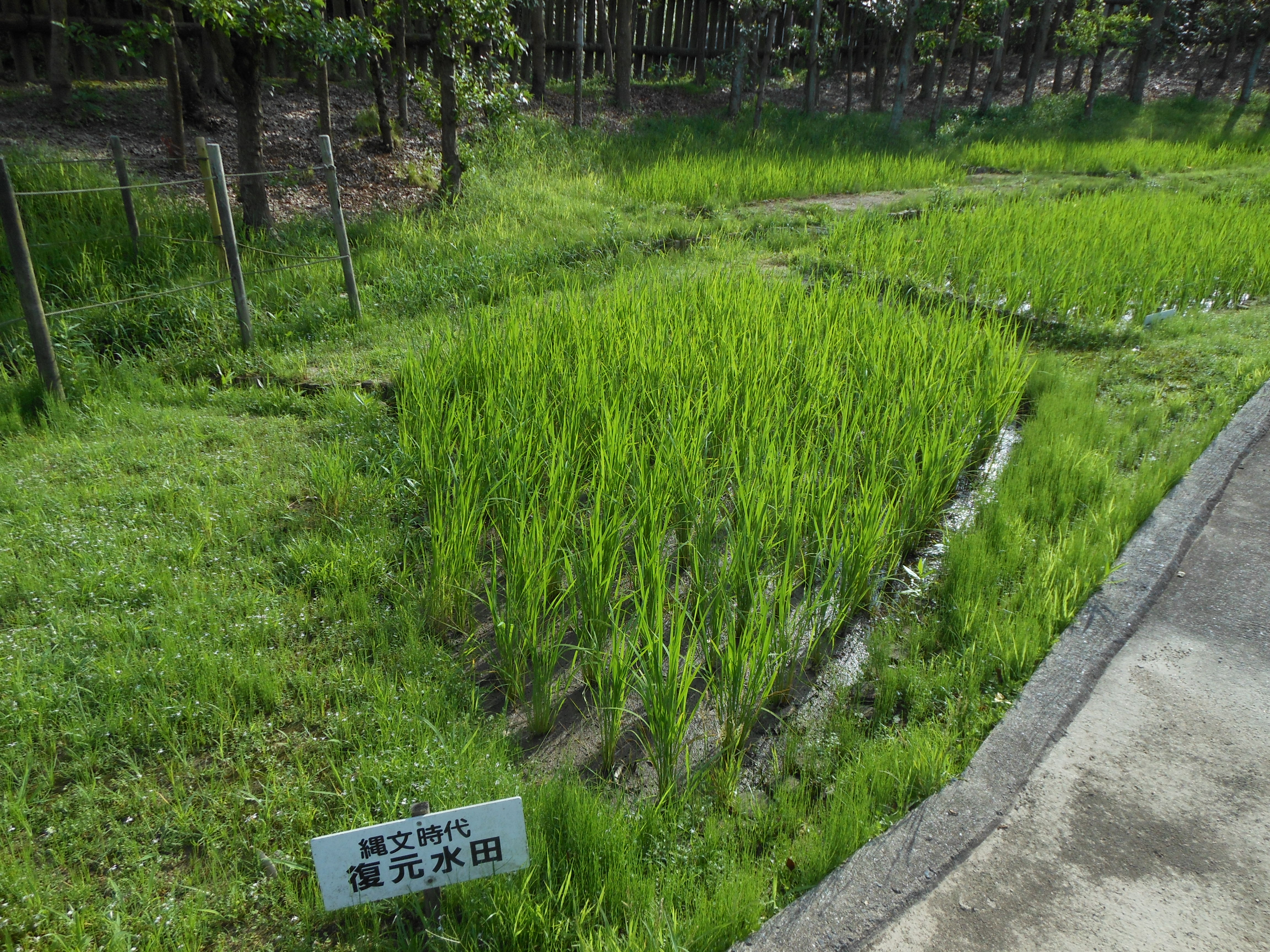
- Nabatake Site rice field

- Nabatake Site Nabatake Site (Japan)
- Interactive map of Nabatake Site
- 33°26′55.1″N 129°57′27.9″E
- Type: settlement
- Periods: Jōmon-Yayoi Period
- Location: Karatsu, Saga, Japan
- Region: Kyushu

Site notes
- Public access: Yes (park, museum)

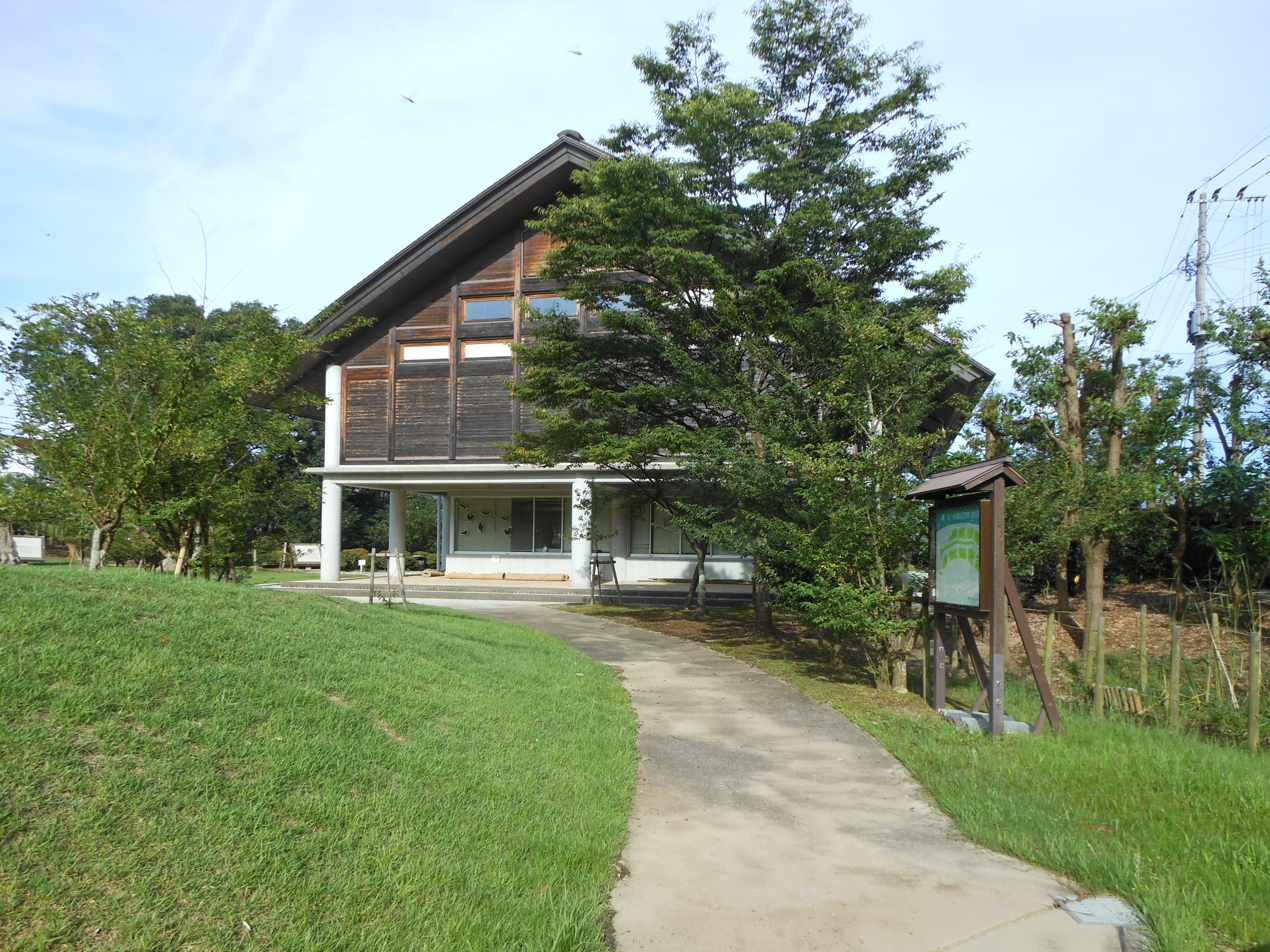
Matsuro-kan Museum

Nabatake Site (菜畑遺跡, Nabatake iseki) is an archaeological site with a late Jōmon period to late Yayoi period settlement located in the city of Karatsu, Saga Prefecture, Japan. Along with the Itazuke Site in Hakata-ku, Fukuoka, it is the oldest known rice-growing village site in Japan. It was designated as a National Historic Site in 1983.

== Overview ==
The Nabatake Site is located at the tip of a gentle hill facing a plain at an elevation of about 10 meters, in the southwestern part of downtown Karatsu, about 2 kilometers west of Karatsu Station. The site was discovered in 1979, and archaeological excavations were carried out from December 1980. The site has clear stratification consisting of 16 layers. The remains of paddy fields were confirmed in the 12th layer, which corresponds to the latter half of the Late Jōmon period. The remains of rice paddies dating back to the middle Yayoi period were also found in the upper layers. During the latter half of the Late Jōmon period, the valley plain was covered with marshes, and evergreen broad-leaved forests grew on the hills behind it. Pollen analysis indicates that in the latter half of the Late Jōmon period, rice cultivation began in upland areas and by the end of the Late Jōmon period, had mostly displaced the marsh plants in the valley.

The remains of the Jōmon portion are four small rice paddies of about 18 square meters each. A wide variety of artifacts were excavated, including wooden hoes, stone knives, stone axes, and Jōmon pottery. The pottery found was Yamanodera-type pottery, which is slightly older than the Yuusu-type pottery found at the Itazuke Site, which was previously considered the oldest. About 250 grains of carbonized rice were also excavated, and more than 100 grains were identified as of them were found to be Japonica rice. These grains were carbon dated to around 930 BC. Excavations have uncovered waterways, dams, drainage outlets, and ridge dividers made of wooden stakes and sheet piles, proving that large-scale rice paddies were operated in the early Yayoi period.

Currently, the Matsurokan (末盧館) Museum, named after Matsurokoku, which is one of the countries described in Wajinden, Book of Liang and History of the Northern Dynasties, and is the first place where Cao Wei emissaries landed on the mainland, displays carbonized rice excavated from the ruins as well as other materials related to the site. The site is now open to the public as an archaeological park, with recreations of pit dwellings and rice paddy remains. It is about a five-minute drive from Karatsu Station on the JR Kyushu Karatsu Line.

== See also ==
- List of Historic Sites of Japan (Saga)
