= Kitamatsuura Peninsula =

Peninsula in Japan

Relief map of Higashimatsuura Peninsula in Nagasaki prefecture and Saga prefecture, Japan

The Kitamatsuura Peninsula (北松浦半島, Kitamatsuura Hantō) is a peninsula located in northwest Kyūshū, projecting northwest from an imaginary line drawn between Imari in Saga Prefecture and Sasebo in Nagasaki Prefecture, Japan. The peninsula is bounded by the Sea of Japan on the west, southwest and the north. Most of the peninsula is within the boundaries of the city of Hirado and Nagasaki Prefecture. The general area of and near the peninsula is commonly called the Hokushō Region (北松地方, Hokushō Chihō).

== Geography ==
Kitamatsuura Peninsula has many bays, inlets, and other coastal features along its shores. Imari Bay is located on the north, the Hirado Strait is located to the west between Hirado Island and the peninsula, and Sasebo Bay is found on the southwest. The peninsula is mainly basalt which forms a gently-sloping tableland and pediment, though it features many small hills and uneven terrain as well. The borders of the tableland are very steep.

There is abundant evidence of ancient landslide activity throughout the peninsula. Much of the land is covered in rice fields, irrigated largely by abundant reservoirs.

Within the stratum laid down during the Tertiary period, abundant coal deposits are found. These resources were developed following World War II, creating rapid economic growth in the Hokushō Region. However, alternative energy activism has led to the closure of many of the mines in the area.

The coastline of Kitamatsuura Peninsula is constantly changing due to erosion from the wind, rain, and ocean waves. The western area of the peninsula is a very wide and flat drowned river valley filled with many small islands including the Kujūku Islands. Much of the area is part of Saikai National Park. The coastal area between Tabira and Matsuura is designated the Hokushō Prefectural Natural Park (北松県立自然公園, Hokushō Kenritsu Shizen Kōen). Saikai National Park (西海国立公園, Saikai Kokutei Kōen) and Genkai Quasi-National Park (玄海国定公園, Genkai Kokutei Kōen) are located on the north side of the peninsula.

Due to the rugged coastline, the fishing industry is very active on Kitamatsuura Peninsula. Tsukinokawa Port in Matsuura hosts a fish market and handles the largest volume in Japan of Japanese jack mackerel and related fish.

== Municipalities ==
The area of the Kitamatsuura Peninsula includes part or all of several municipalities, including Imari in Saga Prefecture, as well as Sasebo (formerly Shikamachi and Kosaza), Hirado (formerly Tabira), Matsuura, and Saza in Nagasaki Prefecture.

== Transportation ==
The main rail transportation on the Kitamatsuura Peninsula is handled by the Nishi-Kyūshū Line, a rail line operated by Matsuura Railway. National Route 204, which carries traffic between Karatsu in Saga Prefecture and Sasebo in Nagasaki Prefecture, and National Route 498, carrying traffic between Kashima in Saga Prefecture and Imari. The Hirado Bridge (平戸大橋, Hirado Ōhashi), part of National Route 383, operates a bridge connecting the peninsula to Hirado Island.
