= List of historic sites of Japan (Nagasaki) =

Nagasaki Prefecture contains the following historic sites of Japan.

== National Historic Sites ==
As of 27 January 2025, thirty-four Sites have been designated as being of national significance (including three *Special Historic Sites).

Site	Municipality	Comments	Image	Coordinates	Type	Ref.
*Kaneda Castle ruins 金田城跡 Kaneda-jō ato	Tsushima	Asuka period fortification	Kaneda Castle ruins	34°17′48″N 129°16′22″E	2	2782
*Harunotsuji Site 原の辻遺跡 Harunotsuji iseki	Iki	Yayoi period settlement trace	Harunotsuji ruins	33°45′32″N 129°45′07″E	1	2791
*Fukui Caves 福井洞窟 Fukui dōkutsu	Sasebo	Japanese Paleolithic site, elevated in 2024 to a Special National Historic Site	Fukui Caves	33°17′31″N 129°41′49″E	1	2778
Siebold Residence Site シーボルト宅跡 Shīboruto taku ato	Nagasaki	former residence of Philipp Franz von Siebold in Nagasaki, now part of the Siebold Memorial Museum	Siebold Residence Site	32°45′20″N 129°53′32″E	9	2740
Hogetto Stone Vessel Production Site ホゲット石鍋製作遺跡 Hogetto ishinabe seisaku iseki	Saikai	Kamakura period stone bowl production site		32°57′03″N 129°41′29″E	6	2781
Iki Kofun Cluster 壱岐古墳群 Iki kofun-gun	Iki	Kofun period tumuli cluster	Iki Kofun Cluster	33°48′09″N 129°42′02″E	1	00003625
Kirishitan Tombstones 吉利支丹墓碑 Kirishitan bohi	Minamishimabara	Edo Period	Kirishitan Tombstones	32°39′10″N 130°17′48″E	7	2763
Shimabara Domain Physic Garden Site 旧島原藩薬園跡 kyū-Shimabara-han yakuen ato	Shimabara	Edo Period medicinal plant garden		32°47′07″N 130°21′07″E	5	2752
Magarizaki Kofun Cluster 曲崎古墳群 Magarizaki kofun-gun	Nagasaki	Kofun period tumuli cluster		32°45′06″N 129°59′18″E	1	2779
Kaneishi Castle 金石城跡 Kaneishi-jō ato	Tsushima	Edo Period castle	Kaneishi Castle	34°12′17″N 129°17′03″E	2	2790
Harayama Dolmen Cluster 原山支石墓群 Harayama shisekibo-gun	Minamishimabara	Jōmon Period cemetery		32°40′46″N 130°12′26″E	1	2771
Hara Castle ruins 原城跡 Hara-jō ato	Minamishimabara	Edo Period castle ruins; inscribed on the UNESCO World Heritage List as one of the Hidden Christian Sites in the Nagasaki Region	Hara Castle ruins	32°37′47″N 130°15′13″E	8	2754
Takashima Shūhan residence 高島秋帆旧宅 Takashima Shūhan kyū-taku	Nagasaki	Bakumatsu period military theorist and patriot		32°44′22″N 129°52′56″E	8	2737
Takashima Coal Mine Sites 高島炭鉱跡 Takashima tankō ato	Nagasaki	Meiji period industrial site, designation includes the sites of Takashima Hokkei Well Shaft (高島北渓井坑跡), Nakanoshima Mine (中ノ島炭坑跡), and Hashima Mine (端島炭坑跡); inscribed on the UNESCO World Heritage List as among the Sites of Japan’s Meiji Industrial Revolution: Iron and Steel, Shipbuilding and Coal Mining	Takashima Coal Mines	32°45′01″N 129°52′40″E	6	00003864
Neso Kofun Cluster 根曽古墳群 Neso Kofun-gun	Tsushima	Kofun period tumuli cluster	Neso Kofun Cluster	34°15′43″N 129°19′26″E	1	2773
Dejima Dutch Trading Post 出島和蘭商館跡 Dejima Oranda shōkan ato	Nagasaki	Edo Period Netherlands East India Company trading settlement	Dejima Dutch Trading Post	32°44′36″N 129°52′23″E	9	2739
Katsumoto Castle ruins 勝本城跡 Katsumoto-jō ato	Iki	Sengoku period castle ruins	Katsumoto Castle ruins	33°50′57″N 129°41′28″E	2	3334
Kosuge Slip Dock 小菅修船場跡 Kosuge shūsen-ba ato	Nagasaki	Meiji period industrial site; inscribed on the UNESCO World Heritage List as among the Sites of Japan’s Meiji Industrial Revolution: Iron and Steel, Shipbuilding and Coal Mining	Kosuge Slip Dock	32°43′38″N 129°51′41″E	6	2768
Shimizuyama Castle ruins 清水山城跡 Shimizuyama-jō ato	Tsushima	Sengoku period castle ruins	Shimizuyama Castle ruins	34°12′28″N 129°17′08″E	2	2784
Senpukuji Cave 泉福寺洞窟 Senpukuji dōkutsu	Sasebo	Japanese Paleolithic site	Senpukuji Cave	33°12′16″N 129°43′49″E	1	2788
Tsushima Domain Sō clan cemetery 対馬藩主宗家墓所 Tsushima-han-shu Sō-ke bosho	Tsushima	Edo Period daimyo cemetery	Tsushima Han Sō Clan Graves	34°12′16″N 129°17′02″E	7	2785
Ōura Church Precinct 大浦天主堂境内 Ōura tenshudō keidai	Nagasaki	Bakumatsu period cathedral; National Treasure, inscribed on the UNESCO World Heritage List as one of the Hidden Christian Sites in the Nagasaki Region	Ōura Church Precinct	32°45′01″N 129°52′40″E	3, 9	3763
Ōmura Domain Ōmura clan cemetery 大村藩主大村家墓所 Ōmura-han-shu Ōmura-ke bosho	Ōmura	Edo Period daimyo cemetery		32°55′02″N 129°57′15″E	7	3408
Ōnodai Dolmen Cluster 大野台支石墓群 Ōnodai shisekibo-gun	Sasebo	Jōmon Period cemetery	Ōnodai Dolmen Cluster	33°17′55″N 129°37′08″E	1	2786
Takashima Kōzaki Site 鷹島神崎遺跡 Takashima Kōzaki iseki	Matsuura	Underwater site with traces from the Kamakura period Mongol Invasions of Japan	Takashima Kōzaki Site	33°20′28″N 129°42′33″E	2	00003771
Nagasaki Atomic Bomb Sites 長崎原爆遺跡 Nagasaki genbaku iseki	Nagasaki	Designation includes "Ground Zero", the former Shiroyama National School Building, old Bell Tower of Urakami Cathedral, gatepost of the Former Nagasaki Medical College & second torii gate of Sanno Shrine	Nagasaki Atomic Bomb Sites	32°45′01″N 129°52′40″E	2	00003956
Nagasaki Battery sites 長崎台場跡 Nagasaki daiba ato	Nagasaki	Bakumatsu period fortifications; designation includes the sites of the Uomidake Battery (魚見岳台場跡) and Shirōgashima Battery (四郎ヶ島台場跡)		32°43′05″N 129°51′09″E	2	2787
Tōnokubi Site 塔の首遺跡 Tōnokubi iseki	Tsushima	Yayoi period graves		34°39′36″N 129°28′13″E	1	2777
Hinoe Castle ruins 日野江城跡 Hinoe-jō ato	Minamishimabara	Sengoku period castle ruins, one of the sites of the early Edo Period Shimabara rebellion	Hinoe Castle ruins	32°39′35″N 130°15′11″E	2	2783
Hizen Hasami Pottery Kiln Sites 肥前波佐見陶磁器窯跡 Hizen Hasami tōjiki kama ato	Hasami	Edo Period pottery kiln ruins	Hizen Hasami Pottery Kiln Sites	33°08′57″N 129°52′11″E	6	3265
Hirado Dutch Trading Post 平戸和蘭商館跡 Hirado Oranda shōkan ato	Hirado	Edo Period Netherlands East Indies trading settlement	Hirado Dutch Trading Post	33°22′22″N 129°33′25″E	9	2738
Yatateyama Kofun Cluster 矢立山古墳群 Yatateyama kofun-gun	Tsushima	Kofun period tumuli cluster		34°13′55″N 129°12′08″E	1	2775
Shimabara Castle Site 島原城跡; Shimabara-jō ato	Shimabara			32°47′24″N 130°22′01″E		
Koshitaka Site 越高遺跡; Koshitaka iseki	Tsushima			34°33′02″N 129°19′24″E		

== Prefectural Historic Sites ==
As of 1 May 2024, ninety-five Sites have been designated as being of prefectural importance.

Site	Municipality	Comments	Image	Coordinates	Type	Ref.
Uku-matsubara Site 宇久松原遺跡; Uku-matsubara iseki	Sasebo			33°15′49″N 129°07′49″E		
Iki Kokubun-ji Site 壱岐国分寺跡; Iki Kokubunji ato	Iki	provincial temple of Iki Province		33°48′00″N 129°42′56″E		
Sainoyama Kofun サイノヤマ古墳; Sainoyama kofun	Tsushima			34°15′41″N 129°18′46″E		
Iki Province Ankoku-ji Site 壱岐国安国寺跡; Iki-no-kuni Ankokuji ato	Iki			33°46′09″N 129°44′55″E		
Ōtsukayama Kofun 大塚山古墳; Ōtsukayama kofun	Iki			33°46′12″N 129°45′00″E		
Tsushima Entsū-ji Sōke Grave Site 対馬円通寺宗家墓地; Tsushima Entsūji sōke bochi	Tsushima			34°27′29″N 129°22′16″E		
Tsushima Domain Shipyard Site 対馬藩お船江跡; Tsushima-han ofunae ato	Tsushima			34°11′15″N 129°17′05″E		
Kamenoo Castle Site 亀丘城跡; Kamenoo-jō ato	Iki			33°45′00″N 129°41′40″E		
Battle of Kōan Setoura Historic Battlefield 弘安の役瀬戸浦古戦場; Kōan-no-eki Setoura kosenjō	Iki			33°48′44″N 129°45′47″E		
Deizuka Kofun 出居塚古墳; Deizuka kofun	Iki			34°15′53″N 129°18′55″E		
Battle of Bun'ei Shinjō Historic Battlefield 文永の役新城古戦場; Bunei-no-eki Shinjō kosenjō	Iki			33°50′02″N 129°43′14″E		
Ishida Castle Site 石田城跡; Ishita-jō ato	Gotō			32°41′34″N 128°50′47″E		
Shirahama Shell Mound 白浜貝塚; Shirahama kaizuka	Gotō			32°39′27″N 128°53′02″E		
Yamasaki Stone Fortress 富江町・山崎の石塁; Tomie-chō Yamasaki no sekirui	Gotō			32°35′14″N 128°45′56″E		
Hinoshima Stone Pagodas 日島の石塔群; Hinoshima sekitō-gun	Shin-Kamigotō			32°54′54″N 128°57′25″E		
Yorigami Shell Mound 寄神貝塚; Yorigami kaizuka	Gotō			32°45′50″N 128°45′33″E		
Gotō Hexagonal Well 六角井 rokkaku ido	Gotō			32°41′49″N 128°50′36″E		
Kawatana Kirishitan Tombstone 川棚町のキリシタン墓碑; Kawatana-chō no kirishitan bohi	Kawatana			33°04′22″N 129°51′33″E		
Sonogi Kofun 彼杵の古墳; Sonogi no kofun	Higashisonogi			33°02′09″N 129°55′55″E		
Chieji-Nobori Kiln Site 智惠治登窯跡; Chieji-Nobori gama ato	Hasami			33°07′52″N 129°56′29″E		
Hasami Kirishitan Tombstone 波佐見町のキリシタン墓碑群; Hasami-chō no kirishitan bohi	Hasami			33°09′22″N 129°56′14″E		
Ichinose Kiln Site 市ノ瀬窯跡; Ichinose kama ato	Saza			33°15′06″N 129°39′26″E		
Kasamatsu Tenjinsha Kofun 笠松天神社古墳; Kasamatsu Tenjinsha kofun	Hirado			33°21′21″N 129°35′32″E		
Kaminosaki Site 神ノ崎遺跡; Kaminosaki iseki	Ojika			33°10′57″N 129°03′25″E		
Masutomi Whaling Family Residence 鯨組主益冨家居宅跡; Kujira-gumi-nushi Masutomi-ke kyotaku ato	Hirado			33°23′40″N 129°26′07″E		
Cocks Sweet Potato Field Site コックスの甘藷畑跡; Kokkusu no kansho hata ato	Hirado			33°20′47″N 129°32′20″E		
Saza Tanukiyama Dolmen Cluster 佐々町狸山支石墓群; Saza-chō Tanukiyama shiseki bogun	Saza			33°15′46″N 129°39′58″E		
Satotabaru Site 里田原遺跡; Satotabaru iseki	Hirado			33°21′34″N 129°35′31″E		
Shijiki Jinja Site 式内社志々伎神社跡; Shikinai-sha Shijiki Jinja ato	Hirado			33°14′20″N 129°27′19″E		
Sekitokudō Site 積徳堂跡; Sekitokudō ato	Hirado			33°21′43″N 129°33′28″E		
Takezaki Kofun 岳崎古墳; Takezaki kofun	Hirado			33°22′25″N 129°35′59″E		
Koxinga Residence 鄭成功居宅跡; Teiseikō kyotaku ato	Hirado			33°19′50″N 129°31′13″E		
Nakano Kiln Site 中野窯跡; Nakano kama ato	Hirado			33°19′44″N 129°29′00″E		
Hirado Hexagonal Well 平戸の六角井戸; Hirado no rokkaku ido	Hirado			33°22′22″N 129°33′12″E		
1592/3 Invasion of Korea Matsura Family Memorial Tō 文禄の役松浦家供養塔; Bunroku no eki Matsura-ke kuyōtō	Matsuura			33°21′02″N 129°46′18″E		
Kajiya Castle Site 松浦党梶谷城跡; Matsuratō Kajiya-jō ato	Matsuura			33°21′06″N 129°47′14″E		
Arie Onoue Kirishitan Tombstone 有家町尾上のキリシタン墓碑; Arie-chō Onoue no kirishitan bohi	Minamishimabara			32°40′39″N 130°18′02″E		
Arie Kogawa Kirishitan Tombstone 有家町小川のキリシタン墓碑; Arie-chō Kogawa no kirishitan bohi	Minamishimabara			32°39′29″N 130°18′19″E		
Arie Nakasukawa Kirishitan Tombstones 有家町中須川のキリシタン墓碑（２基） Arie-chō Nakasukawa no kirishitan bohi	Minamishimabara	2 graves		32°39′40″N 130°18′09″E		
Arie Rikino Kirishitan Tombstones 有家町力野のキリシタン墓碑（２基） Arie-chō Rikino no kirishitan bohi	Minamishimabara	2 graves		32°40′14″N 130°18′06″E		
Entsū-ji Gate Cornerstones 円通寺門礎石; Entsūji mon soseki	Minamishimabara			32°37′43″N 130°10′07″E		
Oni-no-Iwaya 鬼の岩屋; Oni-no-iwaya	Unzen			32°51′28″N 130°18′22″E		
Obama Shīyama Kirishitan Tombstone 小浜町椎山のキリシタン墓碑; Obama-chō Shīyama no kirishitan bohi	Unzen			32°41′52″N 130°10′13″E		
Obama Shigemuta Kirishitan Tombstone 小浜町茂無田のキリシタン墓碑; Obama-chō Shigemuta no kirishitan bohi	Unzen			32°42′22″N 130°12′10″E		
Obama Dotenomoto Kirishitan Tombstones 小浜町土手之元のキリシタン墓碑（４基） Obama-chō Dotenomoto no kirishitan bohi	Unzen	4 graves		32°42′00″N 130°10′31″E		
Kazusa Suzaki Kirishitan Tombstones 加津佐町須崎のキリシタン墓碑（３基） Kazusa-chō Suzaki no kirishitan bohi	Minamishimabara	3 graves		32°37′39″N 130°09′46″E		
Kazusa Sahara Kirishitan Tombstones 加津佐町砂原のキリシタン墓碑（２基） Kazusa-chō Sahara no kirishitan bohi	Minamishimabara	2 graves		32°37′50″N 130°09′07″E		
Kitaarima Saishō-ji Kirishitan Tombstones 北有馬町西正寺のキリシタン墓碑（３基） Kitaarima-chō Saishōji no kirishitan bohi	Minamishimabara	3 graves		32°40′21″N 130°13′34″E		
Kitaarima Tanigawa Kirishitan Tombstone 北有馬町谷川のキリシタン墓碑; Kitaarima-chō Tanigawa no kirishitan bohi	Minamishimabara			32°39′57″N 130°15′08″E		
Daichi Zenji Tō 勤皇大智禅師大梅の塔; Kinnō Daichi zenji ōme no tō	Minamishimabara			32°37′43″N 130°10′05″E		
Kuchinotsu Shirahama Kirishitan Tombstone 口之津町白浜のキリシタン墓碑; Kuchinotsu-chō Shirahama no kirishitan bohi	Minamishimabara			32°36′30″N 130°10′32″E		
Namban Ships Landing Point 南蛮船来航の地; Nanban sen raikō no chi	Minamishimabara	between the arrival of Irmão Luís de Almeida in 1563 and 1582, seven Portuguese ships docked in Kuchinotsu harbour (口之津港), including those of Tristão Vaz de Veiga in 1567 and Alessandro Valignano in 1579		32°37′07″N 130°11′01″E		
Nishiarie Satobō Kirishitan Tombstone 西有家町里坊のキリシタン墓碑; Nishiarie-chō Satobō no kirishitan bohi	Minamishimabara			32°39′58″N 130°17′35″E		
Emukae Honjin Site 江迎本陣跡; Emukae honjin ato	Sasebo			33°18′38″N 129°37′36″E		
Kusumoto Tanzan Residence and Kusumoto Family Graves 楠本端山旧宅と楠本家墓地土墳群７基; Kusumoto Tanzan kyūtaku to Kusumoto-ke bochi dofungun 7-ki	Sasebo	7 graves		33°04′43″N 129°45′10″E		
Sasebo City Iwashita Cave 佐世保市岩下洞穴; Sasebo-shi Iwashita dōketsu	Sasebo			33°12′54″N 129°43′52″E		
Mount Shimomoto Rock Shelters 下本山岩陰遺跡; Shimomoto-yama Iwakage iseki	Sasebo			33°12′22″N 129°40′35″E		
Naoya Castle Site 直谷城跡; Naoya-jō ato	Sasebo			33°16′59″N 129°41′42″E		
Yoshinomoto Kiln Site 葭之本窯跡; Yoshinomoto kama ato	Sasebo			33°10′29″N 129°51′11″E		
Futsu Kirishitan Tombstones 布津町キリシタン墓碑群; Futsu kirishitan bohi	Minamishimabara			32°41′29″N 130°21′05″E		
Kirishitan Tombstone Inscribed "Madeleina" まだれいな銘キリシタン墓碑; Madereina-mei kirishitan bohi	Shimabara			32°48′26″N 130°20′44″E		
Minamiarima Yoshikawa Kirishitan Tombstone 南有馬町吉川のキリシタン墓碑; Minamiarima-chō Yoshikawa no kirishitan bohi	Minamishimabara			32°37′04″N 130°13′53″E		
Minamikushiyama Kirishitan Tombstones 南串山町のキリシタン墓碑（３基） Minamikushiyama kirishitan bohi	Unzen	3 graves		32°41′06″N 130°10′05″E		
Ututsugawa Ware Pottery Kiln Site, Tanaka Sōetsu Grave, Kiln Kannon 現川焼陶窯跡 田中宗悦の墓石1基・窯観音1基（堂を含む） Utsutsugawa-yaki kama ato Tanaka Muneyoshi no boseki 1-ki kama kannon 1-ki (dō o fukumu)	Nagasaki			32°47′40″N 129°55′43″E		
Ōga Family Gishien Brothers Tomb 鉅鹿家魏之琰兄弟の墓; Ōga-ke Gishien kyōdai no haka	Nagasaki			32°45′28″N 129°53′07″E		
Kagetsu 花月; Kagetsu	Nagasaki			32°44′25″N 129°52′48″E		
Kaempfer-Thunberg Monument ケンペル，ツュンベリー記念碑; Kenperu, Tsūnberī kinenhi	Nagasaki			32°44′35″N 129°52′25″E		
Kōfuku-ji Temple Area 興福寺寺域; Kōfukuji ji iki	Nagasaki			32°44′52″N 129°53′02″E		
International Telegraph Cable Relay Station 国際海底電線小ヶ倉陸揚庫 kokusai kaiteidensen kogakura rikuageko	Nagasaki	in 1871 The Great Northern Telegraph Company laid cables from Nagasaki to Shanghai and Vladivostok		32°42′16″N 129°50′52″E		
Isahaya Family Graves 諫早家墓所; Isahaya-ke bosho	Isahaya			32°50′36″N 130°02′51″E		
Ōmura Imadomi Kirishitan Tombstones 大村市今富のキリシタン墓碑; Ōmura-shi Imadomi no kirishitan bohi	Ōmura			32°57′20″N 129°57′24″E		
Seihi Kirishitan Tombstones 西彼町のキリシタン墓碑（２基） Seihi-chō no kirishitan bohi	Saikai	2 graves		32°57′58″N 129°46′08″E		
Ōmura Domain Boathouse Site 大村藩お船蔵跡; Ōmura-han ofunagura ato	Ōmura			32°54′00″N 129°57′40″E		
Sōfuku-ji Masodō 崇福寺媽姐堂; Sōfukuji Masodō	Nagasaki			32°44′32″N 129°53′01″E		
Taira Kosaza Tomb 多以良の小佐々氏墓所; Taira no Kosaza-shi bosho	Saikai			32°58′09″N 129°38′45″E		
Kōgashira Site 川頭遺跡; Kōgashira iseki	Isahaya			32°54′35″N 130°02′01″E		
Mount Kotoo Beacon Site 琴尾山烽火台跡; Kotoo-yama hōkadai ato	Isahaya			32°52′04″N 129°54′29″E		
Gokōkan Onarimon 五教館御成門; Gokōkan Onarimon	Ōmura			32°53′56″N 129°57′39″E		
Daiō-ji Five Hundred Arhats 大雄寺の五百羅漢; Daiōji no gohyaku rakan	Isahaya	magaibutsu (磨崖仏)		32°55′43″N 130°02′19″E		
Todos os Santos Seminary and College Site トードス・オス・サントス跡（セミナリヨ コレジヨを含む） Tōdosu osu Santosu ato (seminariyo korejiyo o fukumu)	Nagasaki			32°45′17″N 129°53′22″E		
Nagato Onizuka Kofun 長戸鬼塚古墳; Nagato Onizuka kofun	Isahaya			32°55′04″N 130°11′05″E		
Tomachi Guardhouse Site Pillars 4, 5, 6, 7 戸町番所跡四・五・六・七番石標柱; Tomachi bansho ato yon go roku nana-ban sekihyōchū	Nagasaki			32°43′33″N 129°51′30″E		
Father Marc Marie de Rotz Sites ド・ロ神父遺跡（救助院跡・いわし網工場跡） Do Ro shinpu iseki (kyūjo-in ato iwashi-mō kōjō ato)	Nagasaki	aid centre and sardine processing facility		32°50′38″N 129°42′03″E		
Nakaura Julian Birthplace 中浦ジュリアン出生の地; Nagasaki Jinzaemon no haka	Saikai			33°00′49″N 129°39′11″E		
Nagasaki Transit of Venus Observation Monument 長崎金星観測碑・観測台; Nagasaki Kinsei kansoku-hi・kansoku-dai	Nagasaki			32°45′15″N 129°53′03″E		
Nagasaki Jinzaemon Tomb 長崎甚左衛門の墓; Nagasaki Jinzaemon no haka	Togitsu			32°49′53″N 129°51′28″E		
Nagayo Temple Residence Site Gorintō 長与の寺屋敷跡五輪塔群; Nagayo no tera yashiki ato gorintō gun	Nagayo			32°49′01″N 129°51′12″E		
Namban Ships Landing Point 南蛮船来航の地; Nanban sen raikō no chi	Saikai	invited by Ōmura Sumitada, Irmão Luís de Almeida arrived at Yokoseura in 1562 and built a church, in which Sumitada was baptised the following June; two further Portuguese ships landed before Yokoseura was attacked and razed by Gotō Takakira (後藤貴明) in November		33°05′08″N 129°42′08″E		
Twenty-Six Martyrs Site 日本二十六聖人殉教地; Nihon nijūroku seijin junkyō-chi	Nagasaki			32°45′17″N 129°52′18″E		
Mount Hōka Watch Tower Site 烽火山かま跡; Hōkazan kama ato	Nagasaki			32°45′25″N 129°53′34″E		
Matsushima Coal Mine Pit 4 Site 松島炭鉱第４坑跡; Matsushima tankō dai-yonkō ato	Saikai			32°55′19″N 129°36′12″E		
Hasami Boundary Marker 三方境傍示石（三領石） Sanpō Zakai bōjiseki (sanryōseki)	Hasami			33°09′52″N 129°52′24″E		
Shimabara Castle Site 島原城跡; Shimabara-jō ato	Shimabara			32°47′24″N 130°22′01″E		
Koshitaka Site 越高遺跡; Shimabara-jō ato	Tsushima			34°33′02″N 129°19′24″E		

== Municipal Historic Sites ==
As of 1 May 2024, a further three hundred and twenty-three Sites have been designated as being of municipal importance.

== See also ==
- Cultural Properties of Japan
- Hizen Province
- Tsushima Province
- Iki Province
- List of Places of Scenic Beauty of Japan (Nagasaki)
- List of Cultural Properties of Japan - paintings (Nagasaki)
- Nagasaki Museum of History and Culture
