= Shōni Suketoki =

Shōni Suketoki (少弐 資時; 1263 – 18 July 1281) was a mid-Kamakura period samurai, the third son of Shōni Tsunesuke. He served as shugodai of Iki Province and was one of the Japanese commanders during the Mongol invasions of Japan. On 18 July, during the second invasion, the Japanese forces were routed in Iki and Suketoki was killed in battle.

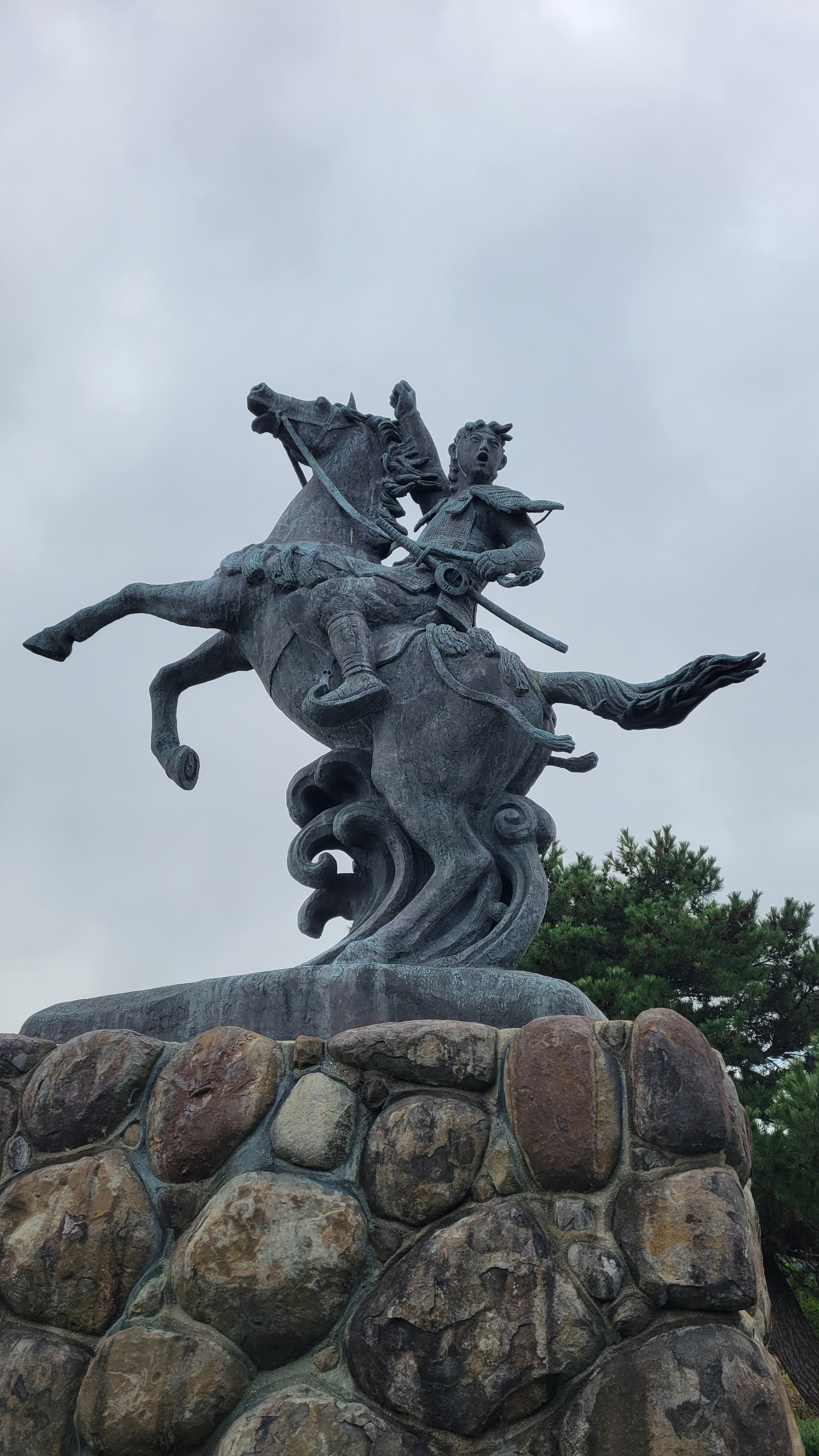
Statue of Shōni Suketoki in Iki, Nagasaki
