= Katsumoto Castle =

Castle ruins in Iki, Nagasaki, Japan

- 勝本城
- Iki, Nagasaki Japan
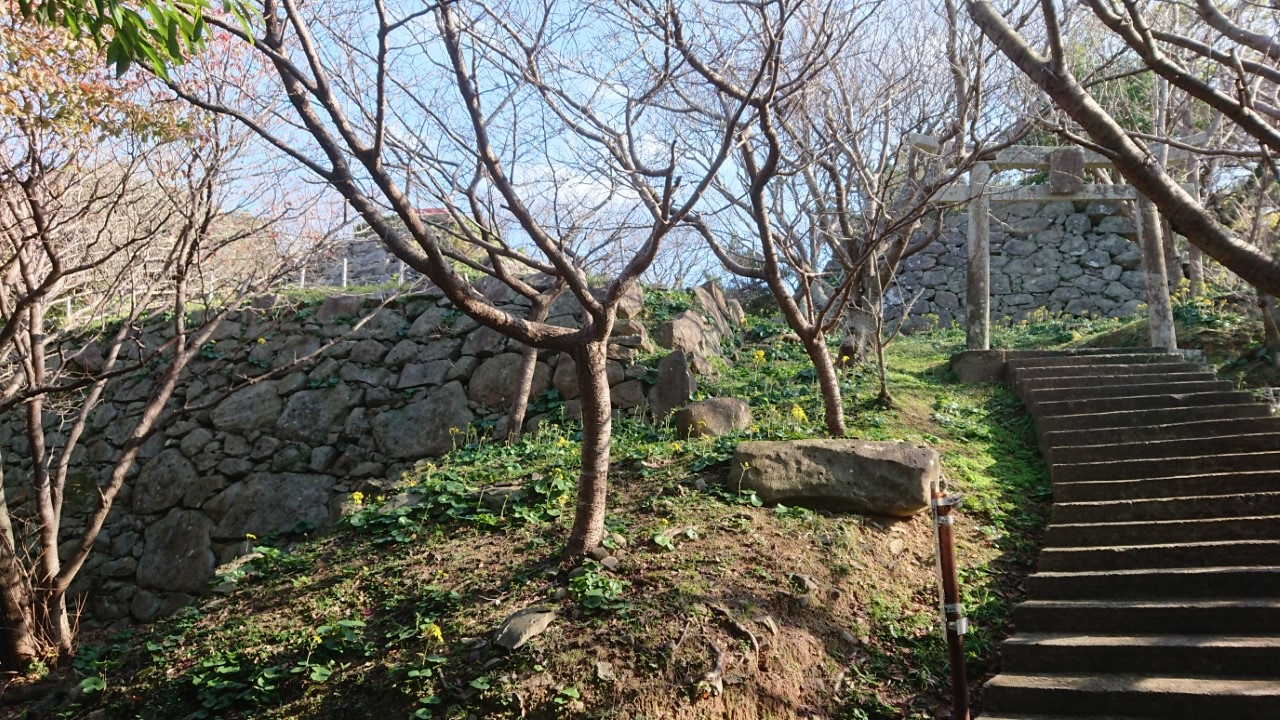
- Site of Katsumoto Castle

Site information
- Type: yamajiro-style Japanese castle
- Controlled by: Matsura clan
- Open to the public: yes
- Condition: Archaeological and designated national historical site; castle ruins

Location
- Coordinates: 33°50′57.5″N 129°41′27.8″E

Site history
- Built: 1591-1597
- Built by: Matsura Shigenobu
- In use: Sengoku period
- National Historic Site of Japan

Katsumoto Castle (勝本城, Katsumoto-jō) was an Sengoku period yamajiro-style Japanese castle located in the Katsumoto neighborhood of the city of Iki, Nagasaki Prefecture, Japan. Its ruins have been protected as a National Historic Site since 2002. It was also known as Azamoto Castle (別称風本) or Amasekane Castle (武末城・雨瀬包).

== Overview ==
Katsumoto Castle was located on the summit of a 78.9 meter hill overlooking Katsumoto Port on the island of Iki, with a distant view of Tsushima Island. When Toyotomi Hideyoshi launched his Invasion of Korea, he established his base at Nagoya Castle in Hizen Province on the mainland of Kyushu, and built outposts at Katsumoto Castle in Iki and Shimizuyama Castle in Tsushima, which were located en route to the Korean Peninsula. In 1591, he ordered Matsura Shigenobu, the lord of Hirado Castle, to construct a stronghold on Iki to serve as a supply base and outlying fortification on the main route to Busan-ura in Korea. Matsura completed it in about four months. The wooden buildings were demolished when Japanese forces withdrew from Korea in 1598. At present, fragments of the stone walls, the "masugata" compound between the first and second gates and some fragments of dry moats remain.

Currently, the surrounding area has been developed as Shiroyama Park. The castle site is about a 25-minute drive from Gonoura Port.

== See also ==
- List of Historic Sites of Japan (Nagasaki)

== Literature ==
- De Lange, William (2021). An Encyclopedia of Japanese Castles. Groningen: Toyo Press. pp. 600 pages. ISBN 978-9492722300.
