= Tsushima Domain Sō clan cemetery =

Historic cemetery in Nagasaki Prefecture, Japan

Tsushima-Fuchū Domain Sō clan cemetery
- 対馬藩主宗家墓所
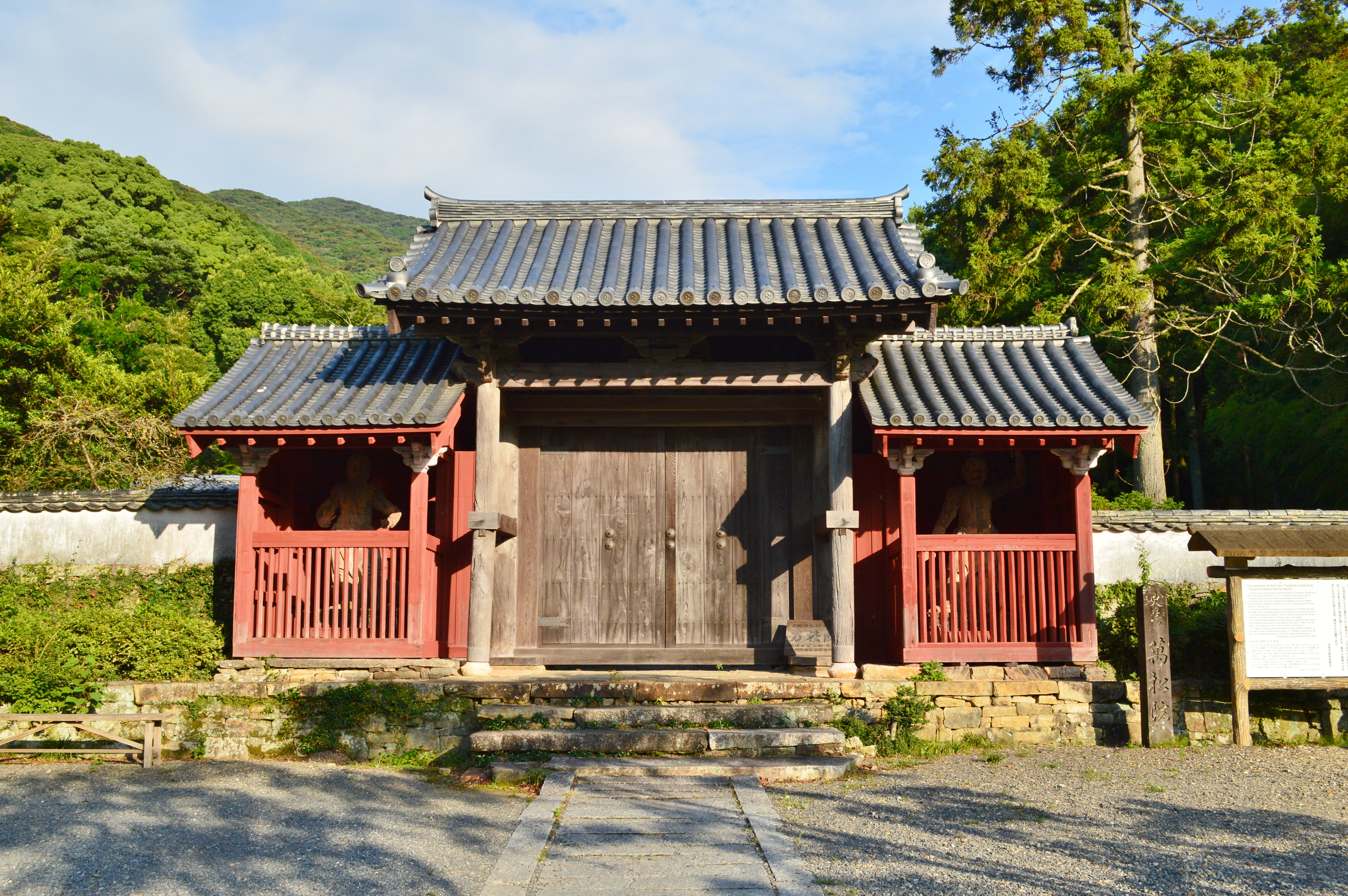
- Mansho-in Sanmon

- Location within Nagasaki Prefecture Location within Japan

Details
- Established: 1615
- Location: Tsushima, Nagasaki
- Country: Japan
- Coordinates: 34°12′15.5″N 129°17′2.9″E
- Type: daimyō cemetery
- Footnotes: National Historic Site of Japan

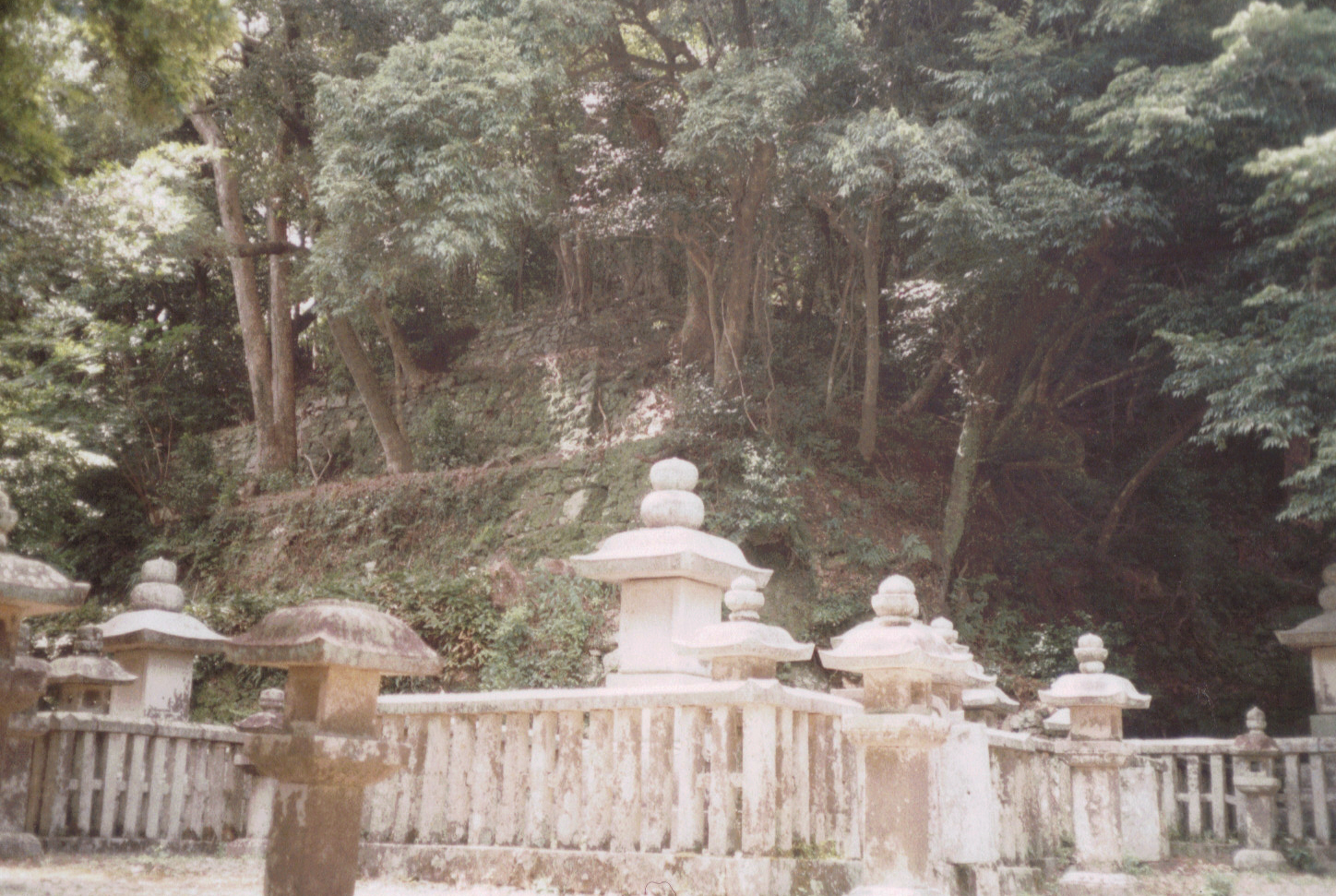
Sō clan cemetery

The Tsushima-Fuchū Domain Sō clan cemetery (対馬藩主宗家墓所, Tsushima-han-shu Sō-ke bosho) is the cemetery that was used by the successive Sō clan daimyō of the Tsushima-Fuchū Domain during Japan’s Edo period. It is located in what was once the Buddhist temple of Manshō-in (万松院) in the Izuhara neighborhood of the city of Tsushima (on Tsushima island) in Nagasaki Prefecture. It was designated a National Historic Site in 1985.

== Overview ==
The Sō clan (宗氏, Sō-shi) was a Japanese clan claiming descent from Taira no Tomomori. The clan governed Tsushima Island as shugo (governors) from the 13th through the late 19th centuries, from the Kamakura period until the end of the Edo period and the Meiji Restoration. Sō Yoshitoshi retained his position as daimyō under the Tokugawa shogunate. His descendants were ennobled as counts (hakushaku) under the kazoku peerage system.

=== Manshō-in ===
In 1615, Sō Yoshinari, the 20th chieftain of the Sō clan and second daimyō of Tsushima-Fuchū Domain, built a temple west of the Sō clan residence at Kinseki Castle, as a memorial temple for his father, the first daimyō, Sō Yoshitoshi. The temple served as the bodaiji of the clan through the end of the Edo Period.

Originally a Rinzai school Zen temple called Shōon-ji, it was renamed Banshō-in in 1622 after Sō Yoshitoshi's posthumous Buddhist name. In 1635, at the urging of the monk Jisei Daisojō, the temple converted from Rinzai to Tendai Buddhism.

In 1647, the temple was relocated to its current site after an area at the foot of the mountain was cleared. The temple was destroyed by a fire in 1691, and again in 1726. The current main hall was rebuilt in 1879.

Inside the hall are displayed three Buddhist altars gifted by the kings of Korea and the ihai memorial tablets of the Tokugawa shoguns.

The Azuchi-Momoyama-style Sanmon gate with its Niō statues is the oldest building on Tsushima.

=== Sō clan cemetery ===
The Sō clan cemetery is located on the hill behind the temple, and can be reached by climbing 132 large natural stone steps, known as Hyakuganki, next to the Sanmon gate. The steps are lined on either side by stone lanterns. The area is covered with large cedar trees hundreds of years old.

The upper level (Kami Otamaya) is the resting place of 14 generations of daimyō since Sō Yoshitoshi, as well as their wives.

The middle level (Naka Otamaya) has the grave of Sō Sadakuni (1468–1492), a Muromachi period clan chieftain famous for his active diplomacy with Korea, as well as those of his concubines and children.

The lower level (Shimo Otamaya) has the graves of the family and branch families of Sō Yoshinari. Tsushima Domain had a nominal kokudaka of 100,000 koku, but the cemetery was on a scale usually seen only in larger domains with a stipend of hundreds of thousands of koku.

== See also ==
- List of Historic Sites of Japan (Nagasaki)
