= Shimabara Domain Physic Garden =

Shimabara Domain physic gardens
- 旧島原藩薬園 (Japanese)
- Shimabara Domain Shimabara Domain Physic Garden (Japan)
- Interactive map of Shimabara Domain physic gardens
- 32°47′8″N 130°21′8″E
- Type: botanic garden
- Periods: Edo period
- Location: Shimabara, Nagasaki, Japan
- Region: Kyushu

Site notes
- Public access: Yes (occasionally)

The Shimabara Domain physic garden (旧島原藩薬園, Shimabara-han Yakuen) was an Edo period physic garden, located in the Oyama neighborhood of the city of Shimabara, Kagoshima Prefecture Japan. The site was designated a National Historic Site of Japan in 1929. Along with the Morino Botanical Garden in Nara and Sata physic gardens in Kagoshima it is regarded as one of the three major pre-modern botanical gardens in Japan.

== Overview ==
Matsudaira Tadanari, the daimyō of Shimabara Domain, invited Kaku Saichiro, a disciple of Philipp Franz von Siebold who popularized Western medicine in Nagasaki to work as a domain doctor in 1842 and to establish a school to teach western medicine. The following year he was ordered to establish a garden to cultivate medicinal herbs in the grounds of the Seishukan medical school. However, the conditions for cultivation were not good, and in 1846 vassal of the domain, Iijima Yoshizumi, was appointed as the garden director and the garden relocated the foot of Mount Mayu in Mount Unzen.The garden was expanded in 1853 to reach its current dimensions. In addition to medicinal research, the garden was intended to be a source of revenue for the domain; however, it was abolished in 1869 without ever fully functioning.

Archaeological excavation, restoration and maintenance of the garden remains began in 1974. The site measures approximately 90 meters north-to-south and 110 meters east-to-west and is surrounded on three sides by stone walls to the east, west, and north, with a dike to the south. The park is divided into north and south by a road and consists of terraced fields. The stone walls, remains of the residence buildings, storage sheds, water tanks, etc. have been restored to recreate the appearance of the time. There are also remains of the barracks and warehouses for the garden workers, and currently the garden cultivates approximately 400 types of medicinal herbs.

== See also ==
- List of Historic Sites of Japan (Nagasaki)
