= Neso Kofun Cluster =

Neso Kofun cluster
- 根曽古墳群 (Japanese)
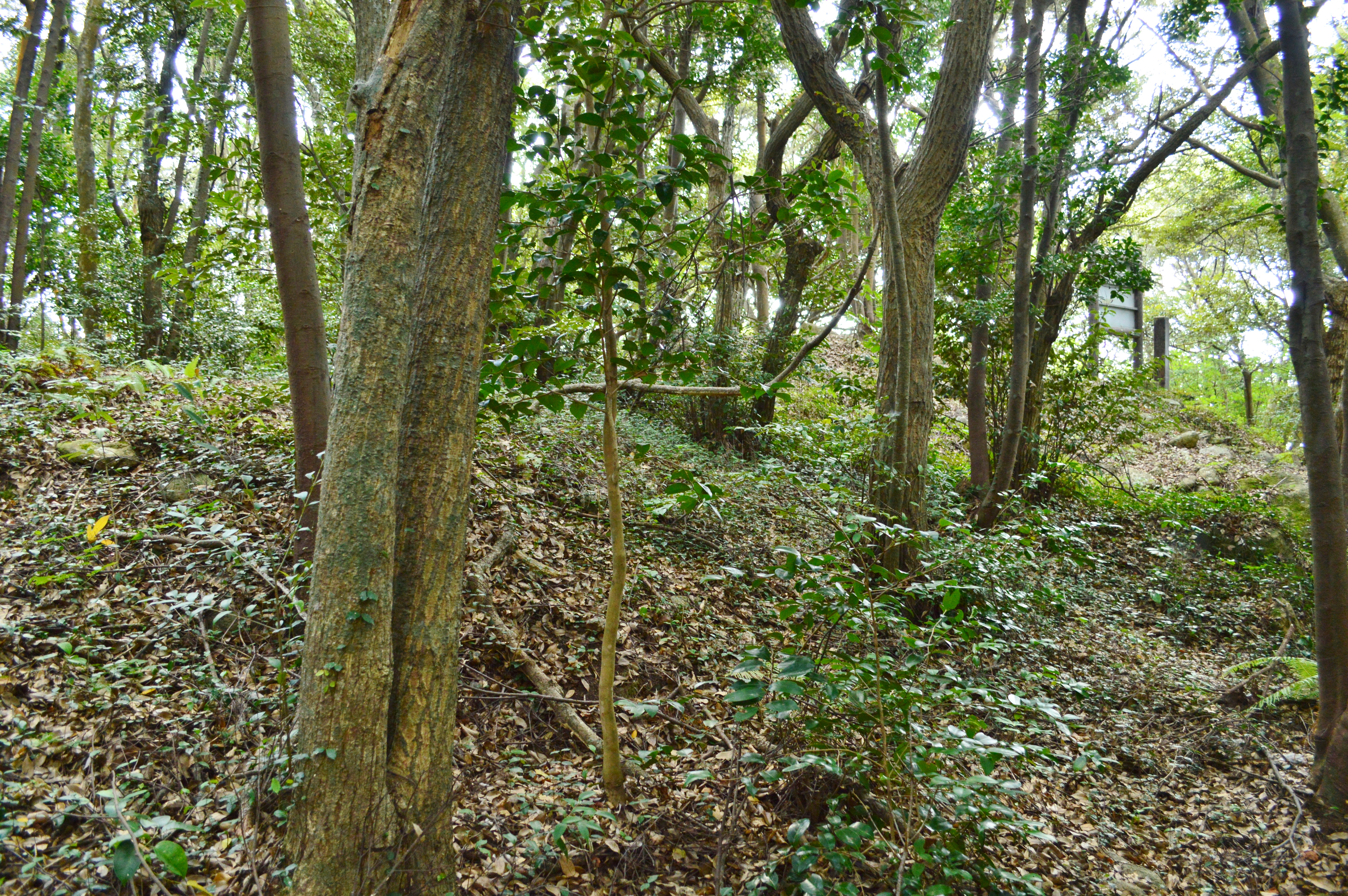
- Neso Kofun No.1

- Neso Kofun cluster Neso Kofun Cluster (Japan)
- Interactive map of Neso Kofun cluster
- 34°15′49.60″N 129°19′26.69″E
- Type: Kofun
- Periods: Kofun period
- Location: Tsushima, Nagasaki, Japan
- Region: Kyushu region

History
- Built: c.6th century

Site notes
- Public access: Yes (no facilities)

Neso Kofun cluster (根曽古墳群) is a group of late Kofun period burial mounds, located in the Neso, Mitsushima-cho neighborhood of the city of Tsushima, Nagasaki Prefecture in the Kyushu region of Japan. The tumuli were designated a National Historic Site of Japan in 1976.

== Overview ==
The Neso Kofun cluster is located on the eastern ridge of the cape that borders Kechiura on the eastern coast of central Tsushima. The group of tumuli consists of three zenpō-kōen-fun (前方後円墳), which is shaped like a keyhole, having one square end and one circular end, when viewed from above and two circular enpun (円墳)-style tumuli. Four tumuli were discovered in 1922, one more in 1948 and one more after that. The construction of the group of tumuli is estimated to be in the 6th century.

Neso Kofun No. 1 is a keyhole-shaped tomb located at the highest elevation on the ridge. It is made of piled stones and has a total length of about 30 meters. The front part is 12.3 meters long, 5.5 meters wide, and one meter high, and the rear circular part is 14.5 meters in diameter and 2.5 meters higher than the front part. In the rear circular part, there is a stone slab burial chamber parallel to the main axis of the tumulus. A willow-leaf-shaped iron arrowhead, an iron sword, and a tubular bead made of jasper have been discovered as grave goods within the burial chamber.

Neso Kofun No.2 is also a stone mound keyhole-shaped tumulus, 35.6 meters in length. The shape of the tomb has been well preserved, with a stone slab burial chamber in the center of the circular rear section and another stone slab burial chamber in the narrow front section.

Neso Kofun No.3 does not retain its shape, but is thought to be a circular tomb, with a stone slab horizontal-type burial chamber made of large materials and a unique structure with each wall made of a single stone.

Neso Kofun No.4 is also a stone mound keyhole-shaped tomb, but it has been severely destroyed.

Neso Kofun No.5 is a stone mound circular tomb with a box-shaped stone sarcophagus.

As these tombs and the Tsuru-no-yama Kofun on the opposite bank are the only other keyhole-shaped tombs on Tsushima, they are considered valuable ruins, and indicate the possibility of Yamato control of the Tsushima islands in the 6th century.

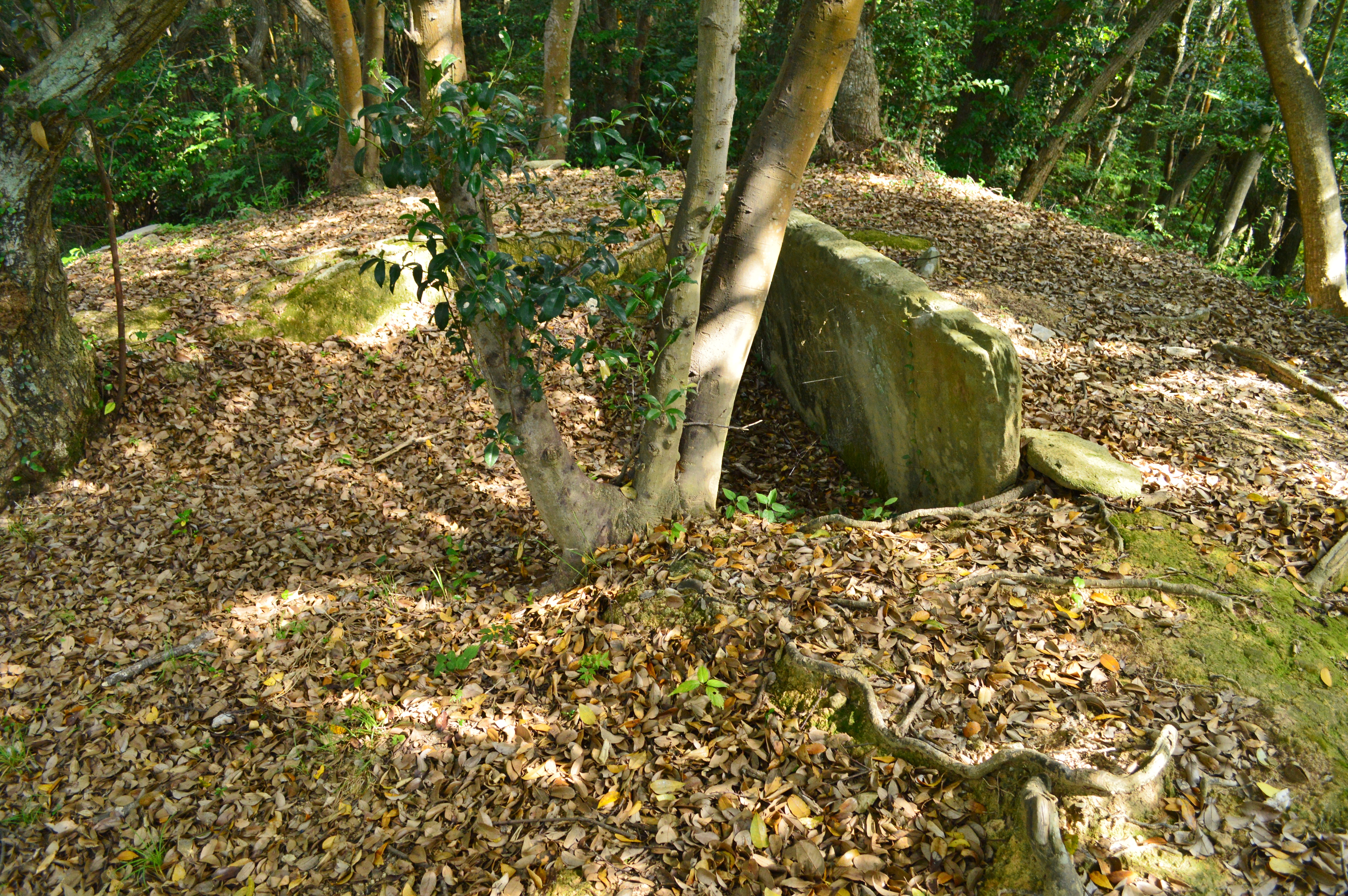
Neso Kofun No.1

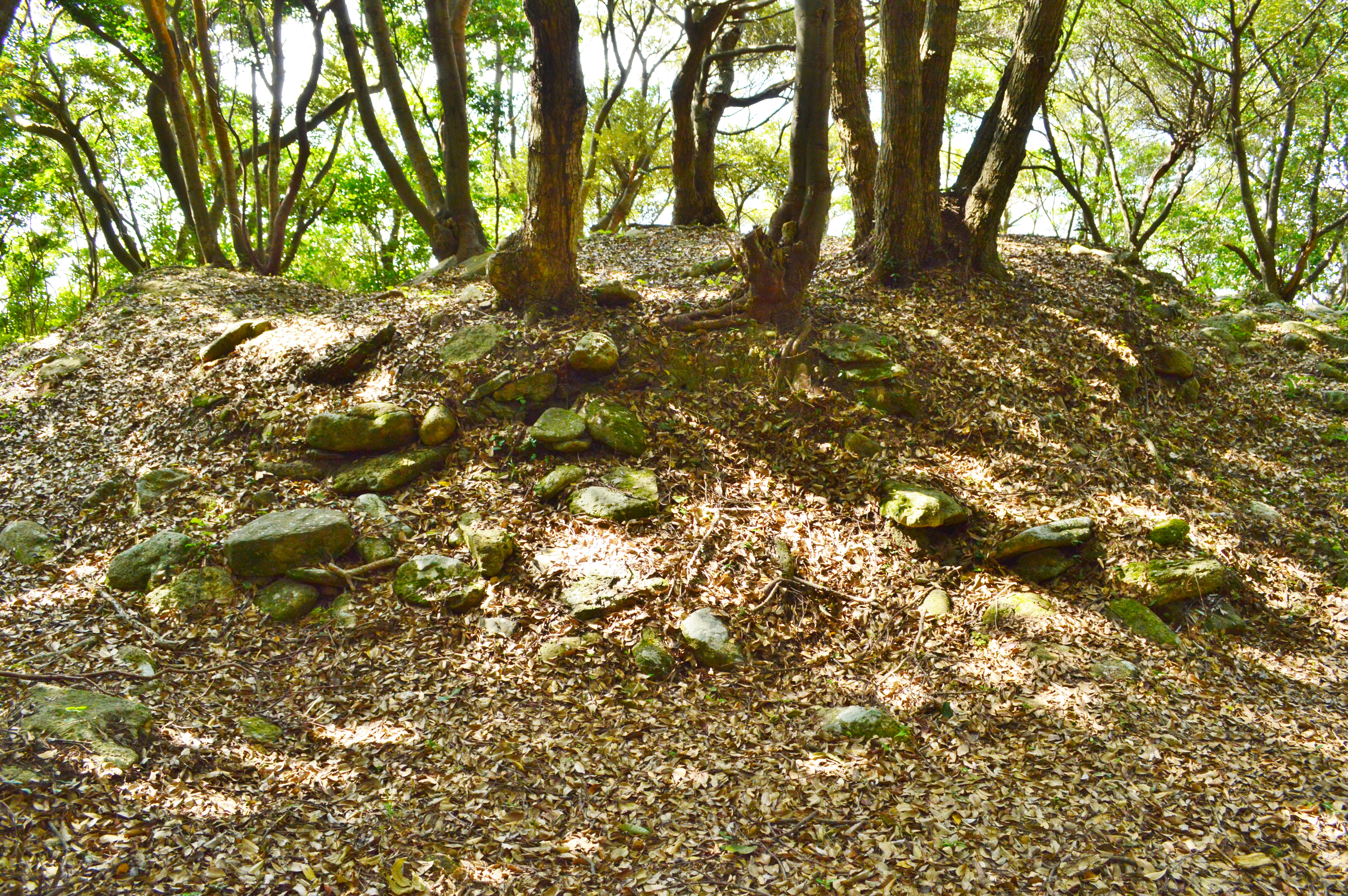
Neso Kofun No.2

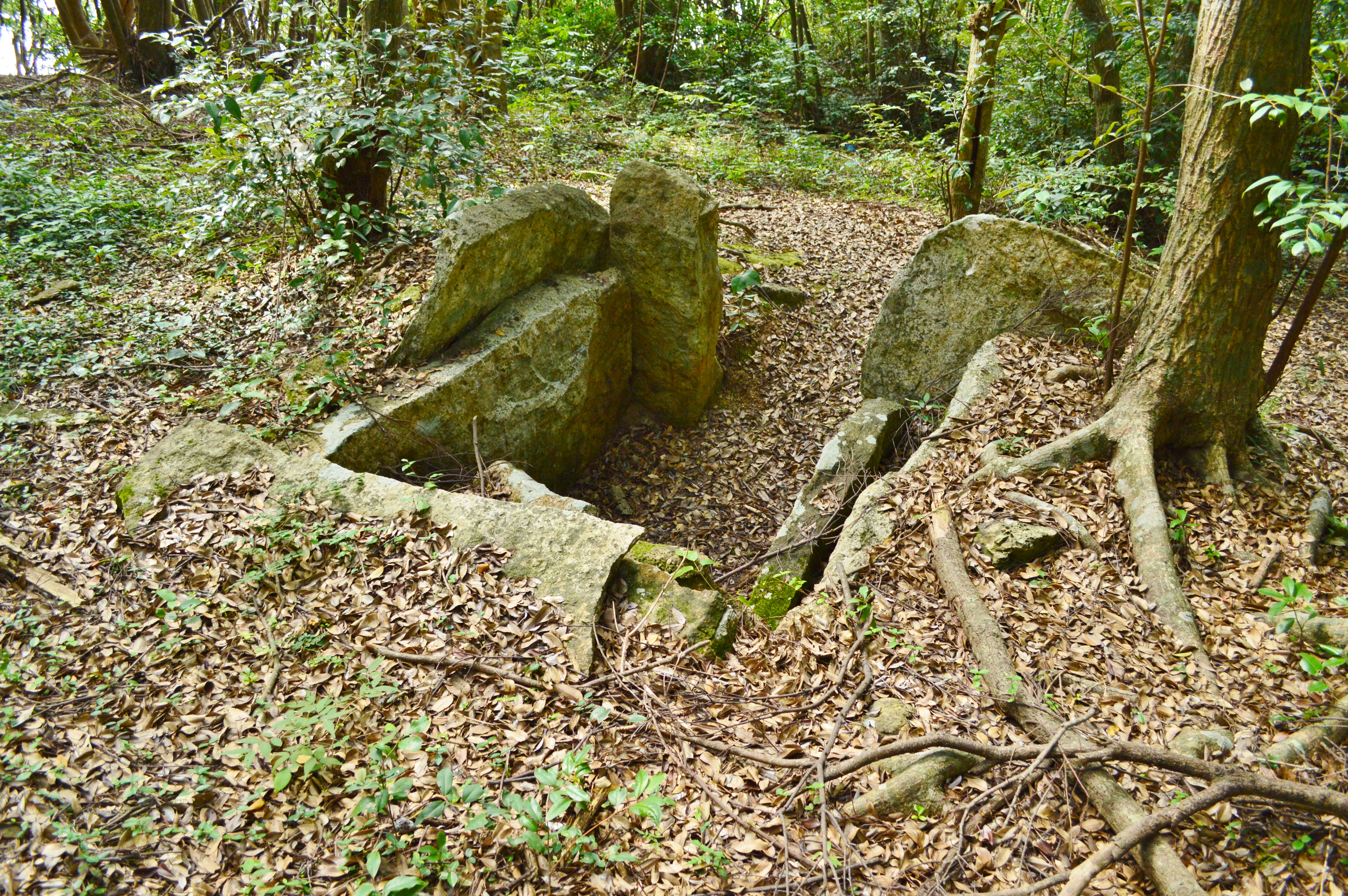
Neso Kofun No.3

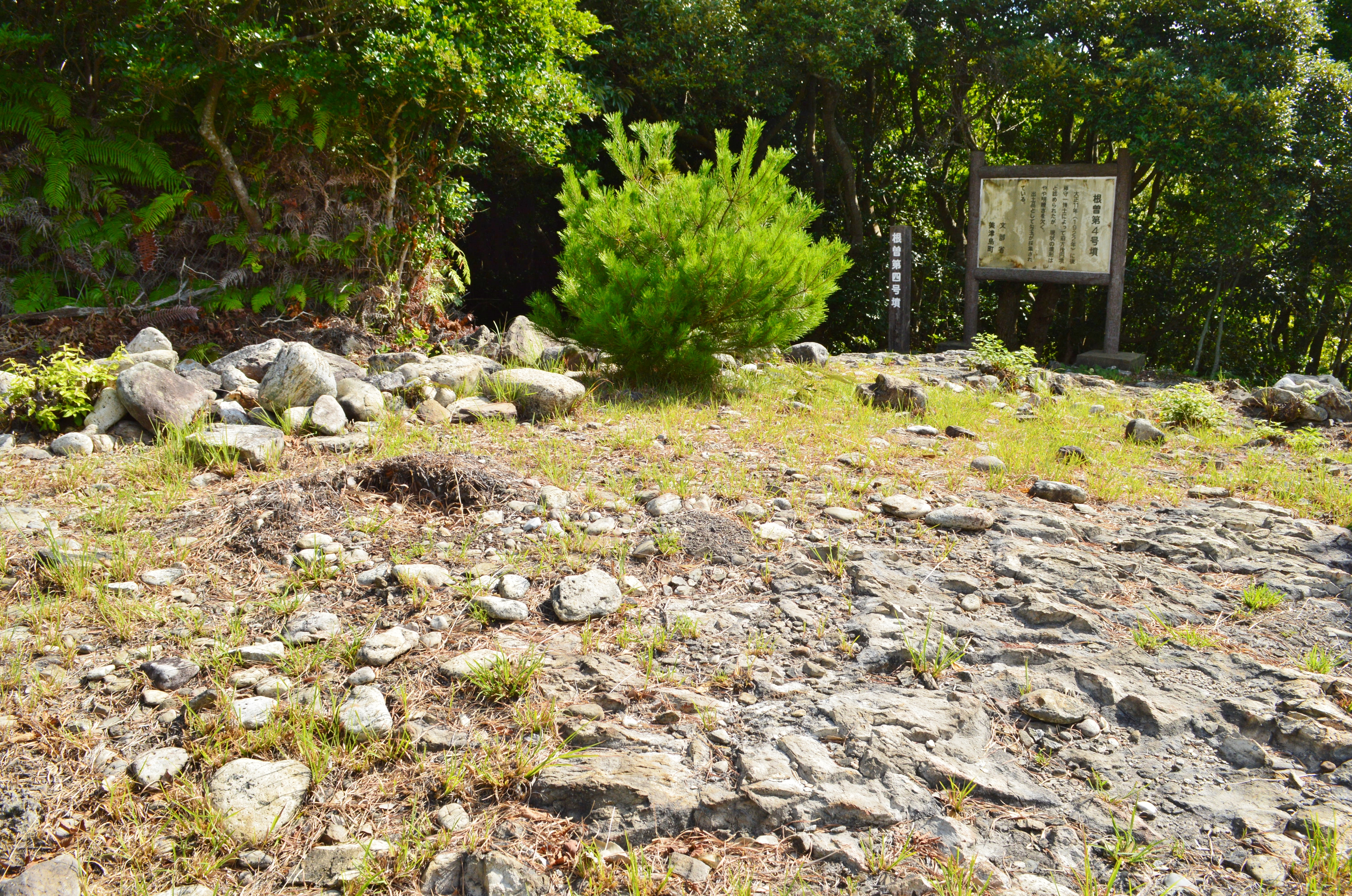
Neso Kofun No.4

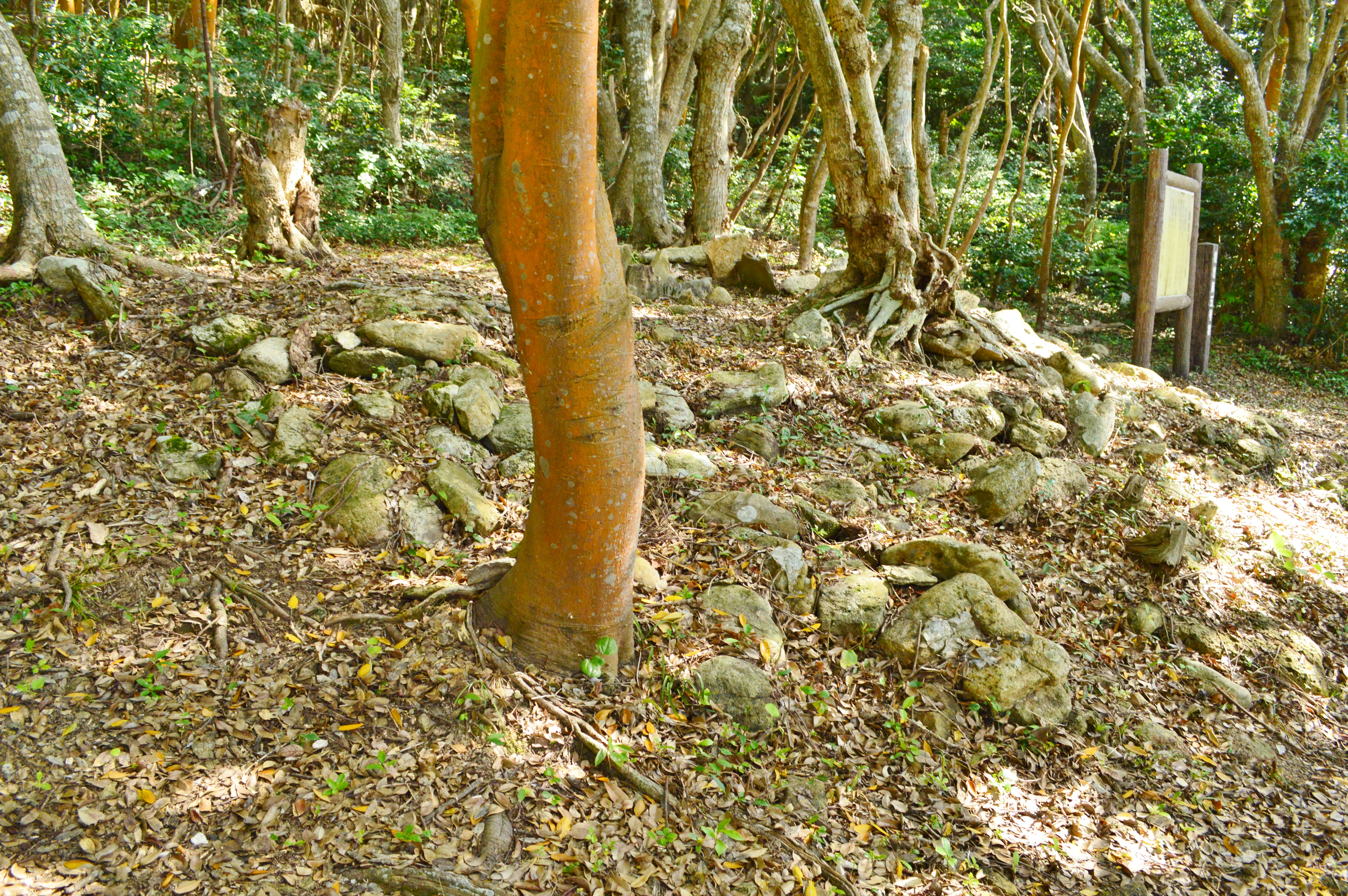
Neso Kofun No.5

== See also ==
- List of Historic Sites of Japan (Nagasaki)
