= Nagasaki Battery sites =

- 長崎台場跡 (Japanese)
- Location within Nagasaki Prefecture Location within Japan
- Interactive map of Nagasaki Battery sites
- 32°43′05″N 129°51′09″E
- Type: fortification
- Location: Nagasaki, Nagasaki, Japan

History
- Built: 1654, 1808, 1853
- Demolished: 1871
- National Historic Site of Japan

The Nagasaki Battery Sites (長崎台場跡, Nagasaki Daiba-ato) were a group of 23 coastal artillery batteries erected to protect the port of Nagasaki in what is now Nagasaki Prefecture on the island of Kyushu Japan during the Edo Period Tokugawa shogunate. The ruins one of these sites was designated a National Historic Site in 1986 with the additional sites added to the designation in 2014 and 2020.

== Overview ==
During the Edo period, numerous coastal defense batteries were built in and around Nagasaki in Hizen Province, which was tenryō territory under direct control of the Tokugawa shogunate, and the only place in Japan that was open to foreign trade during the period of Japan's national isolation policy. In 1641, the Nishidomari and Tomachi guardhouses were established at the entrance to the port. In 1654, seven gun batteries were built at the entrance to the port. As the number of incursions by foreign vessels increased in the early 19th century and Western powers were expanding their colonial empires in Asia and making more insistent demands that Japan allow trade, five more fortifications were constructed in 1808. However, that same year the HMS Phaeton (1782)#Nagasaki Harbour Incident occurred, in which a Royal Navy frigate, HMS Phaeton entered Nagasaki harbor under a false flag, attacked the Dutch trading post at Dejima, and demanded supplies (water, food and fuel) from the Japanese authorities on threat of destruction of the city. The cannons in the Japanese harbour defenses were old and most could not even fire. At the time, it was the Saga Domain's turn to protect Nagasaki, but they had economized by stationing only 100 troops there, instead of the 1,000 officially required. Consequently, the meager Japanese forces in Nagasaki were seriously out-gunned and unable to intervene. The incident led to the construction of four more gun batteries.

There are a total of 23 recorded Nagasaki gun batteries, of which the following three are designated as national historic sites:

The Uomidake Battery (魚見岳台場跡) was completed in 1810 by Fukuoka Domain and was armed with 22 cannon. It was located on the western slope of Uomidake, defending the entrance to Nagasaki Port opposite the Kanzaki Battery built at Kozakihana. The remains of the battery and the gunpowder magazine remain. The battery consists of the Sannomasu Battery, which is a deformed hexagon, followed by the nearly rectangular Ninomasu Battery and the L-shaped Ichinomasu Battery, with the first two separated by over 100 meters, and the second two separated by over 30 meters. Three plots are lined up one above the other, almost adjacent to the north of Sannomasu Battery and Ninomasu Battery, with the lower section containing tool sheds and living quarters, and the middle section being a square area of unknown use. The upper section is 24 meters above the middle section, where a stone storehouse (the gunpowder magazine) was built, but no other buildings remain. This stone storehouse is a single-story building with a tiled roof measuring 3.5 x 3.7 meters in plan, and is in good condition. It was designated a national historic site in 1986.

The Shirogashima Battery (四郎ヶ島台場跡) was built in 1853 by Saga Domain, and reflects the introduction of Western military technology, such as breastworks. It is the last of the 23 to be completed. The battery was located on a small island measuring approximately 220 meters east-to-west and 120 meters north-to-south, located on the edge of the outer edge of Nagasaki Port, approximately 200 meters southwest of the Kaminoshima area. Saga Domain recognized the need for defense outside Nagasaki Port proper in order to strengthen security. The interior of Shirogashima was excavated and the surrounding area was reinforced with breastworks made of stones and banks, forming an upper and lower enclosure. Western-style castle construction techniques were used in the construction, and arc-shaped and bastion-shaped breastworks were adopted, along with earthworks and the introduction of Western-style cannons, including two 150-pounder cannons. The Nagasaki City Board of Education conducted excavation surveys of the interior of the old battery site and surveyed the outer stone wall facing the coast on the northern edge in 2009 and 2010. The outer stone wall has a total length of approximately 96 meters at the top, a total length of approximately 112 meters at the base, and a height of 4 to 11 meters, and continues in a slightly folding screen shape. It is made of sandstone. Although there has been some collapse at the base, overall it remains in the same condition as when it was first built. The remains of an ammunition storehouse from that time was also discovered. It was added to the National Historic Site designation in 2014.

The Megami Battery (女神台場跡) was one of the original fortifications completed in 1654, but was extensively expanded and rebuilt in 1808. No remains of the battery itself have survived, as the location of the battery itself is now under Japan National Route 499, but a stone storehouse related to the new battery survives, and was additionally designated part of the National Historic Site in 2020.

== See also ==
- List of Historic Sites of Japan (Nagasaki)
