= Hogetto Stone Vessel Production Site =

- ホゲット石鍋製作遺跡 (Japanese)
- Hogetto Stone Vessel Production Site Hogetto Stone Vessel Production Site (Japan)
- Interactive map of Hogetto Stone Vessel Production Site
- 32°57′03″N 129°41′29″E
- Type: Industrial site
- Periods: late Heian - Kamakura period
- Location: Saikai, Nagasaki, Japan
- Region: Kyushu region

Site notes
- Public access: Yes (no facilities)

Hogetto Stone Vessel Production Site (ホゲット石鍋製作遺跡) is a late Heian to Kamakura period manufacturing site for stone pots, located in the Ōseto neighborhood of the city of Saikai, Nagasaki Prefecture in the Kyushu region of Japan. The site was designated a National Historic Site of Japan in 1981.

== Overview ==
Stone pots used for simmering that were widespread in Japan during the from the end of the Heian period to the Muromachi period, when it was still difficult to mass-produce iron pots. Although stone pot manufacturing sites have been confirmed in Fukuoka Prefecture and Yamaguchi Prefecture, the stone pot manufacturing sites on the Nishisonogi Peninsula in Nagasaki are the largest in the country in terms of both size and number, and stone pots from these sites were exported as far north as Aomori Prefecture and as far south as the Ryukyu Islands. The pots made at the more than 50 known sites with 11 manufacturing plants on the Nishisonogi Peninsula used a form of talc. The National Historic Site designation covers Site No.6 which is the best preserved, and has traces of stone pot production remaining in situ on a cliff face six meters high and 60 meters long. To make stone pots, the talc rock wall is divided into 30-40-centimeter squares, which were then carved into the shape of an abacus bead, and then carved off the rock wall and shaped. As there are very few documents relating to the production of stone pots, this a valuable site for understanding the production techniques.

Excavated items are on display at the Ōseto History and Folklore Museum in Saikai City. The site is about an hour and 10 minute by car from Haiki Station on the JR Kyushu Sasebo Line.

== See also ==
- List of Historic Sites of Japan (Nagasaki)
