= Harunotsuji Site =

Archaeological site in Iki, Japan

Haranotsuji Site
- 原の辻遺跡 (Japanese)
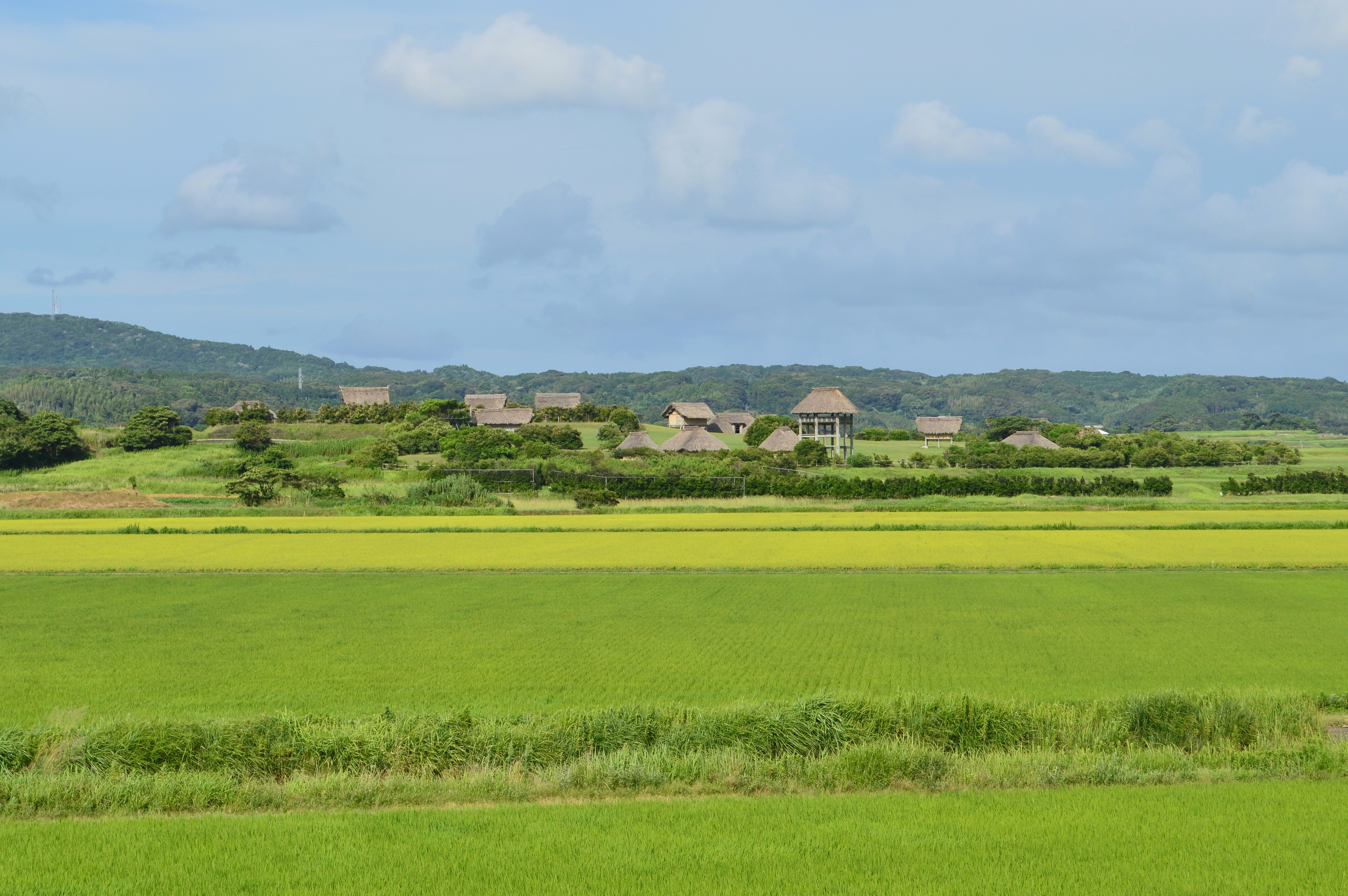
- Haranotsuji Site

- Haranotsuji Site Harunotsuji Site (Japan)
- Interactive map of Haranotsuji Site
- 33°45′34.0″N 129°45′11.6″E
- Periods: Yayoi period
- Location: Iki, Nagasaki, Japan
- Region: Kyushu region

Site notes
- Public access: Yes (Muduem, park)

The Haranotsuji Site (原の辻遺跡, Hara-no-tsuji ato) is an archaeological site with the remains of a large Yayoi period settlement located in the Ashibe-machi and Ishida-machi neighborhoods of the city of Iki, Nagasaki Prefecture, Japan. The site was designated as a National Historic Site in 1997 with the area under protection expanded and promoted to a Special Historic Site in 2000. The area under protection was further expanded in 2005 and 2009.

== Overview ==
The Haranotsuji Site is located on lower reaches of the Hatahoko River and spreads from the plateau to the plains in the southeastern part of Iki Island. The ruins have been attracting attention since the Taisho era, and after prewar and postwar archaeological excavations have revealed that the settlement dates from early Yayoi period to the early Kofun period. The settlement area surrounded by three moats is 24 hectares in size, about 350 meters east-to-west and about 750 meters north-to-south. It is thought that on the east side of this area were the houses and offices of officials. Cemeteries have been found to the north, east, and southeast of the moat. The total size of the settlement, including the remains of the surrounding area, it is approximately 100 hectares.

Inside the moat, the foundations of the ritual site with remains of post-hole buildings and a residential area consisting of numerous remains of pit dwellings were confirmed, and inside and outside the moat, a burial area was confirmed, and the remains of a wharf were also discovered. Charcoaled rice and wheat have also been excavated from the remains of pit dwellings from the middle of the Yayoi period. Paddy fields spread across the lowlands of the island's river basins, and wet-rice farming was practiced. Compared to Tsushima Island, wet-rice farming was more widespread. Relics found not only include Yayoi pottery and stone tools, but also bronze, iron, wooden, bone and horn tools, etc., which were excavated in large quantities in good condition. In particular, many pottery, bronze and iron tools were found that support interactions with groups from the Asian continent, as well as Chinese coins and a stone face. As the site corresponded to the central settlement of "Ikikoku", a Japanese kingdom mentioned in the he Chinese Wèizhì Wōrén chuán (Japanese 魏志倭人伝, Gishi Wajinden), part of the Records of the Three Kingdoms dating from the third century AD, it is considered important in shedding light on foreign relations during the Yayoi period.

The surrounding area has been developed as Harunotsuji Ikikoku Royal Capital Reconstruction Park, and excavated items are on display at the Iki City Ikikoku Museum. It is about a 10-minute drive from Ashibe Port.

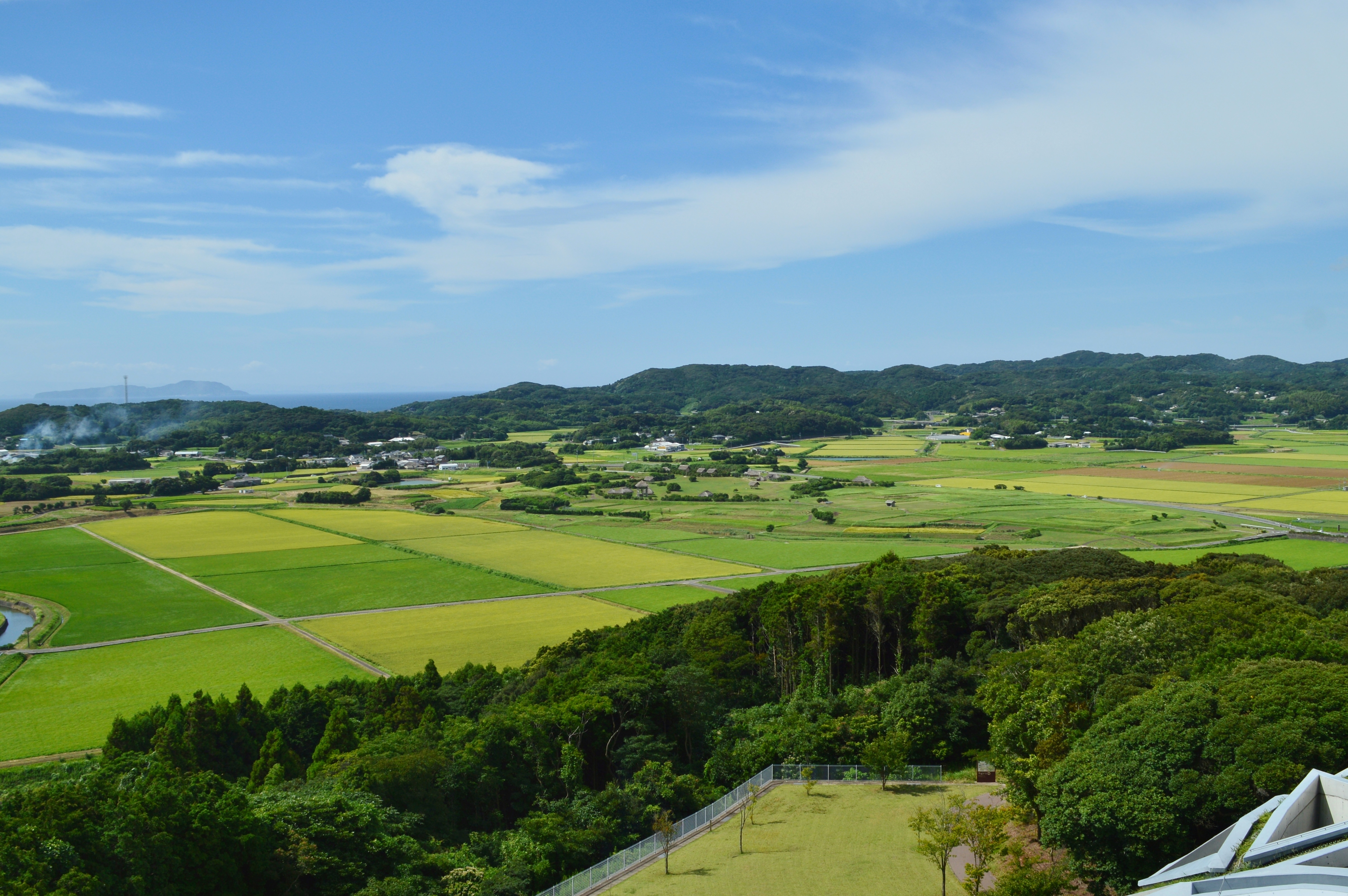
Fukaetahara Plain where the Harunotsuji Ruins (central part) are located

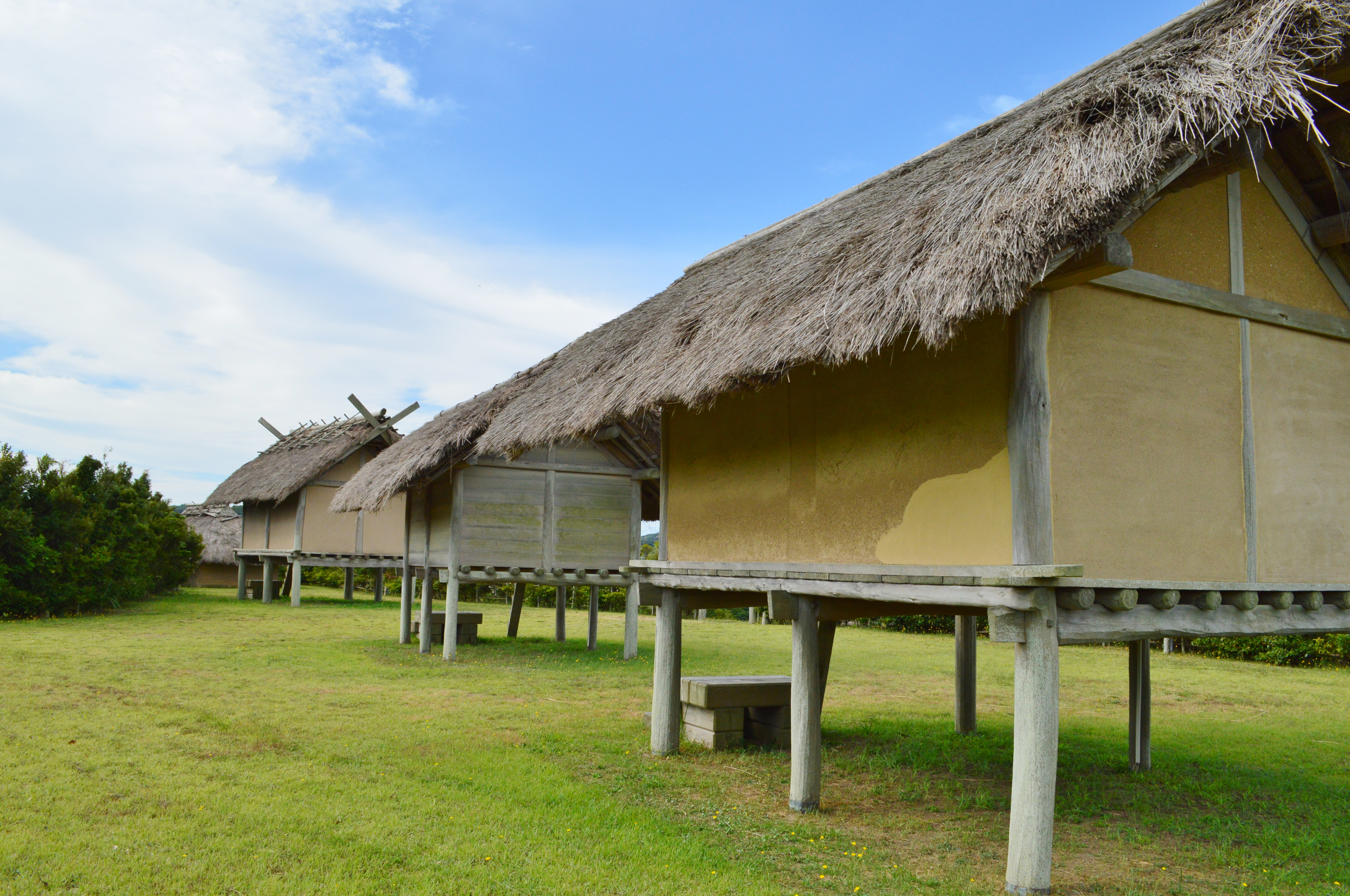
Ritual buildings

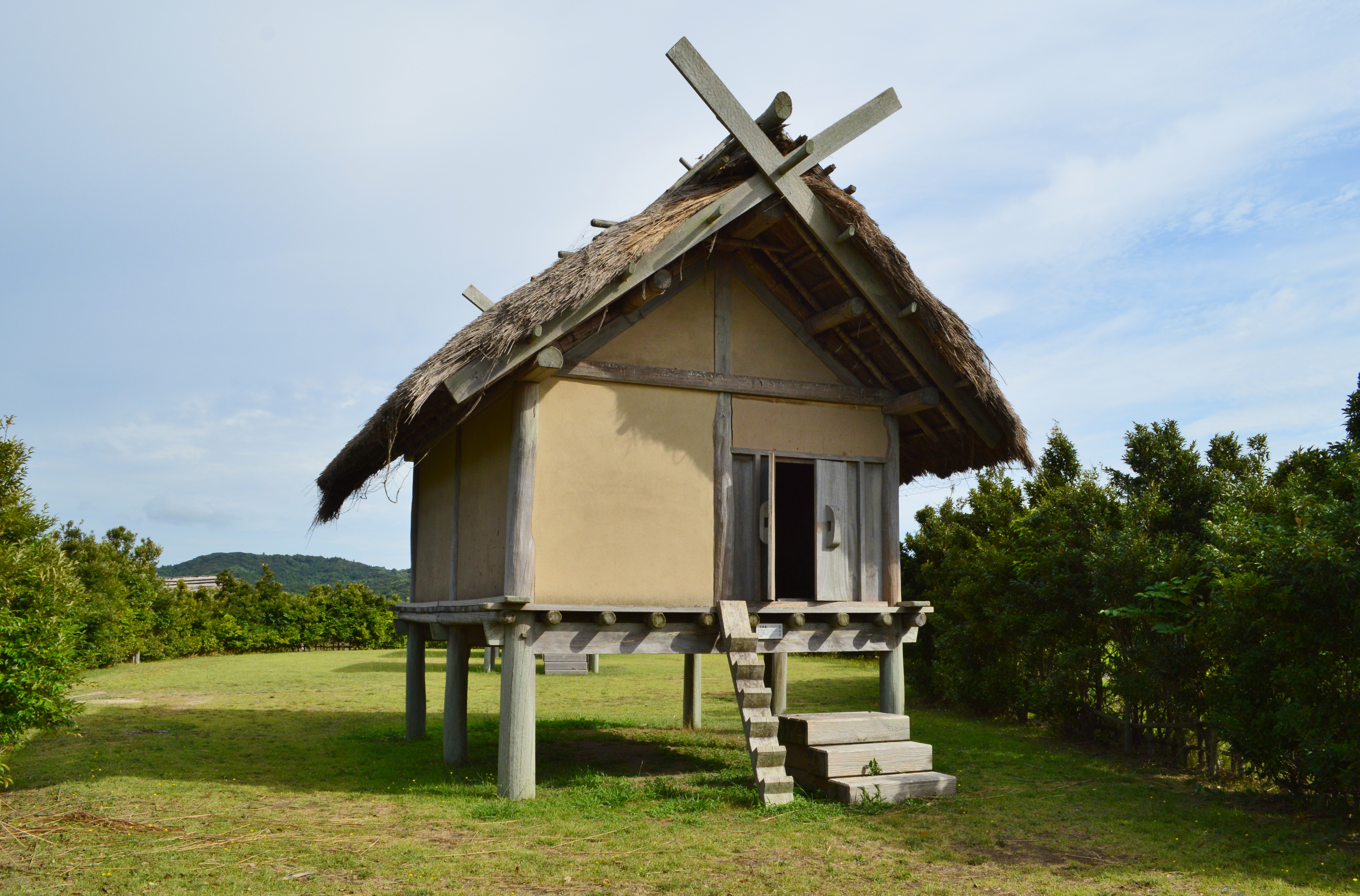
Main shrine

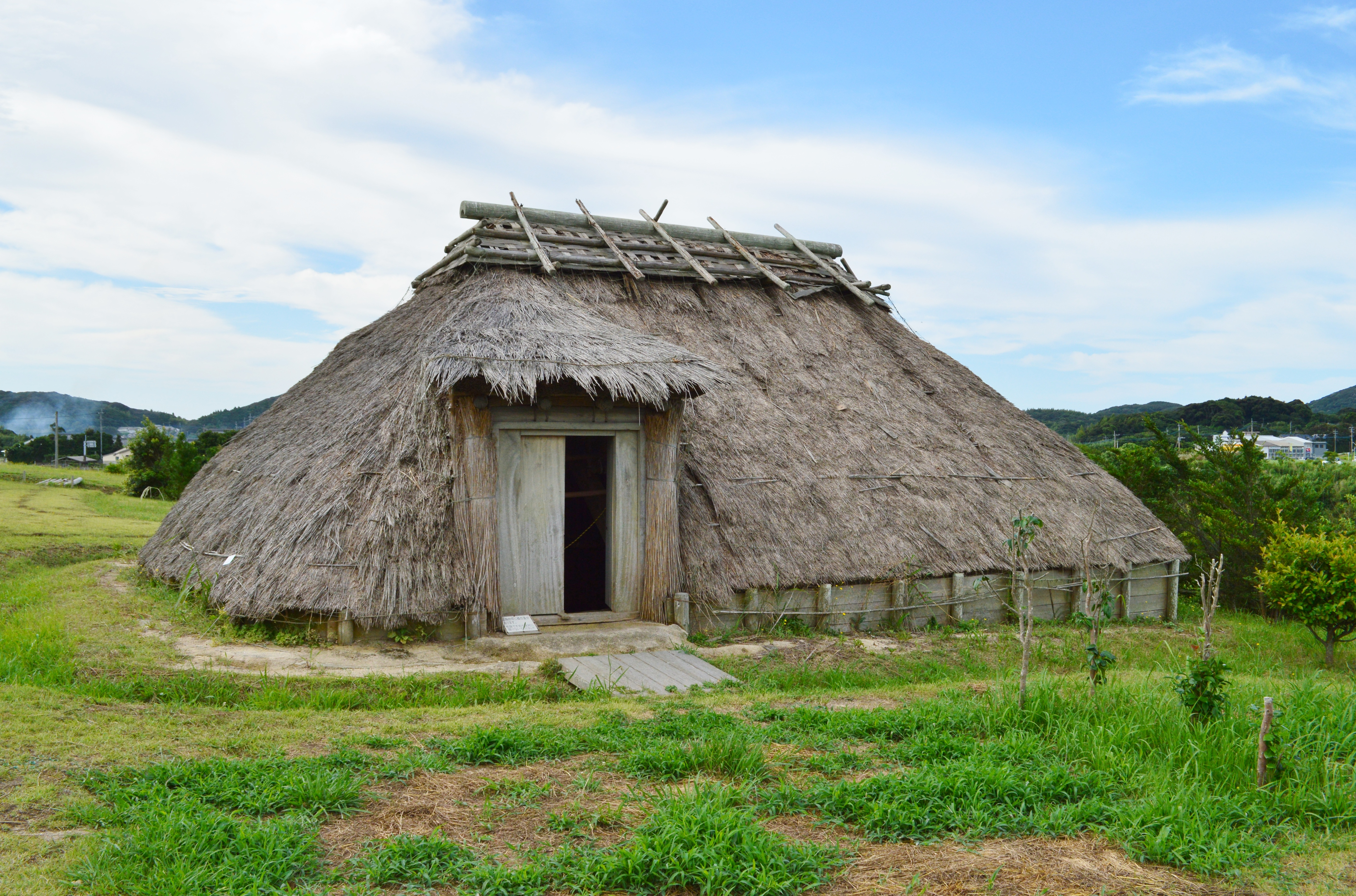
Royal residence

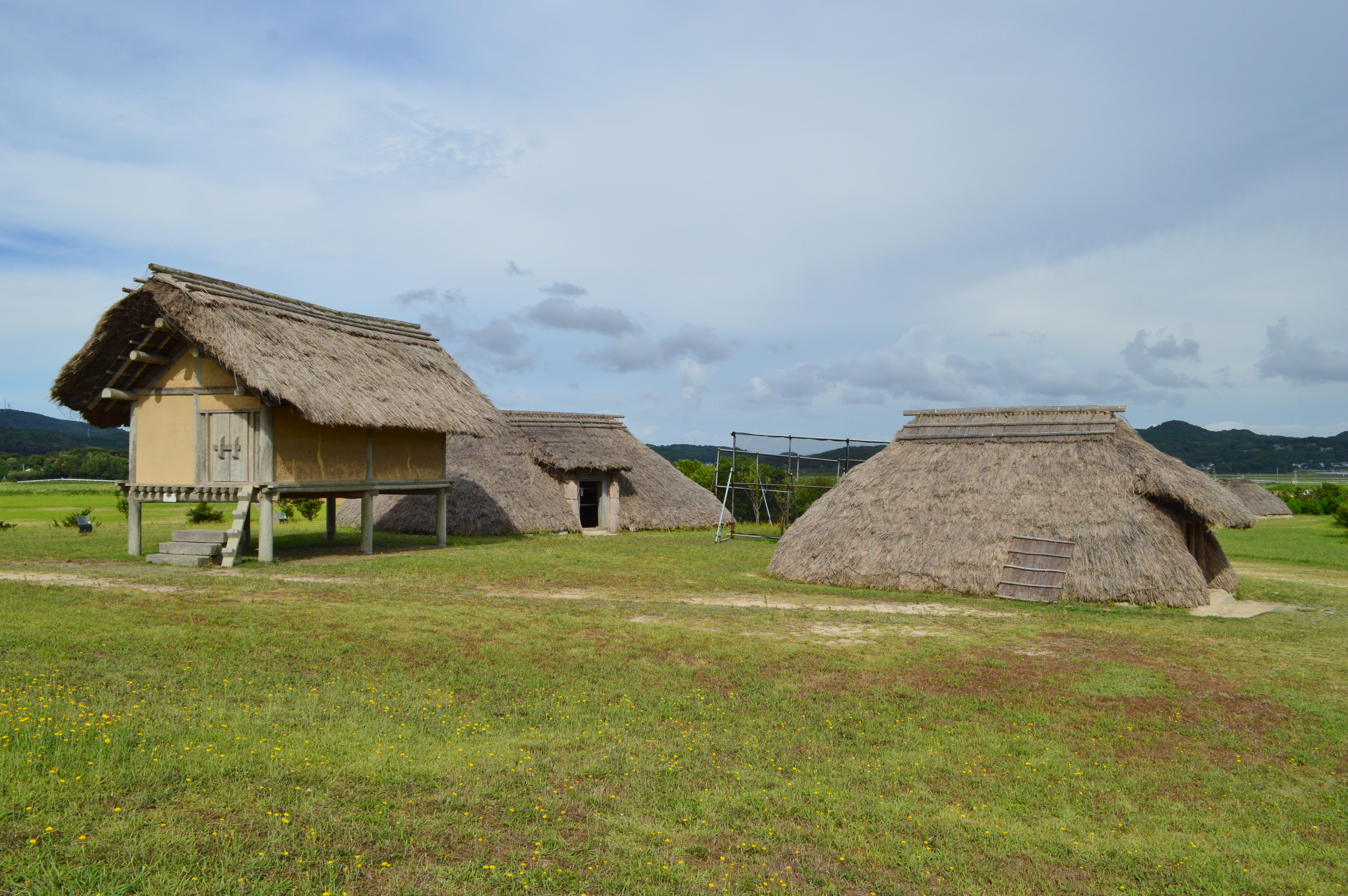
Guesthouse

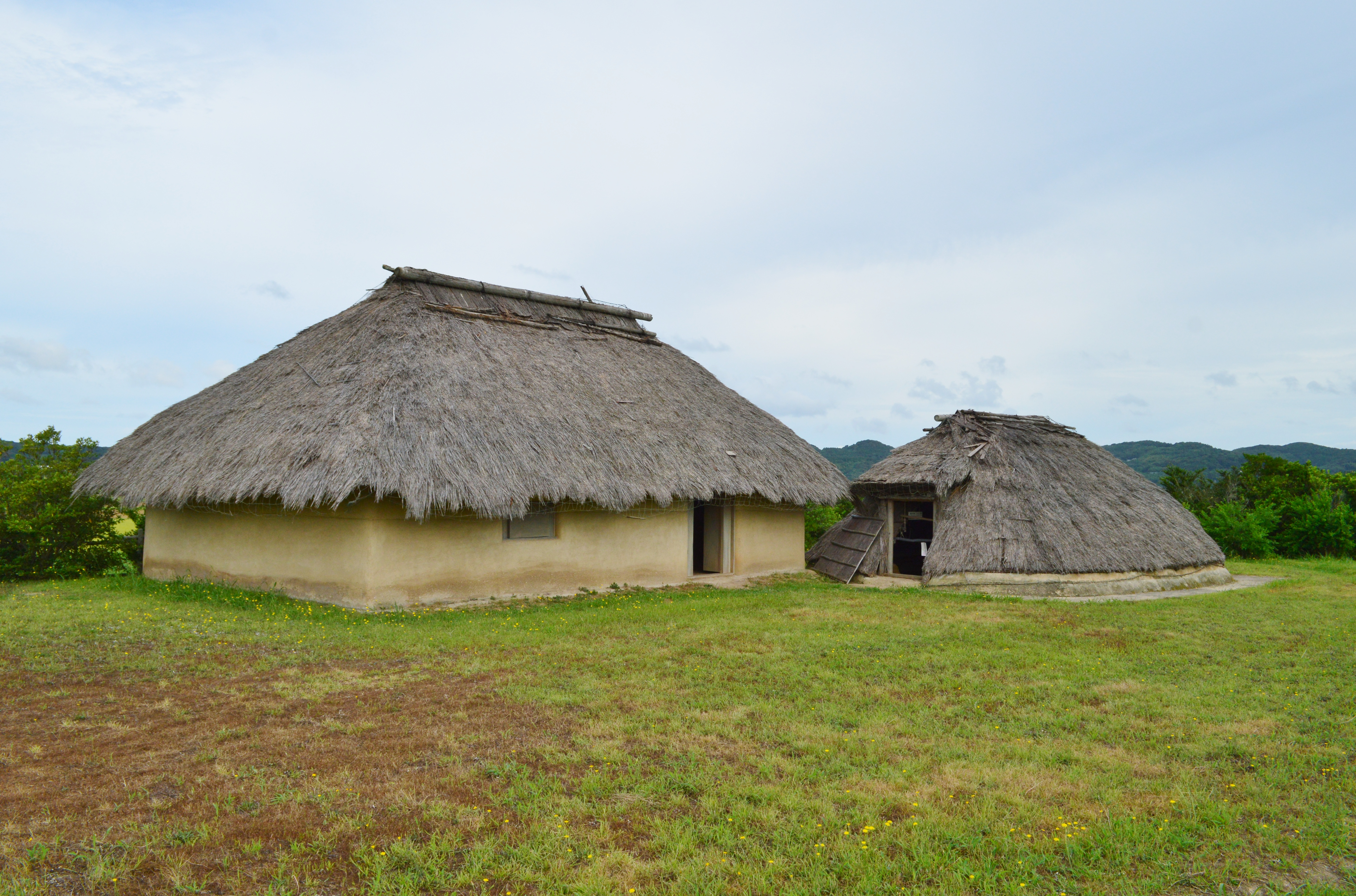
Meeting hall and elders' house

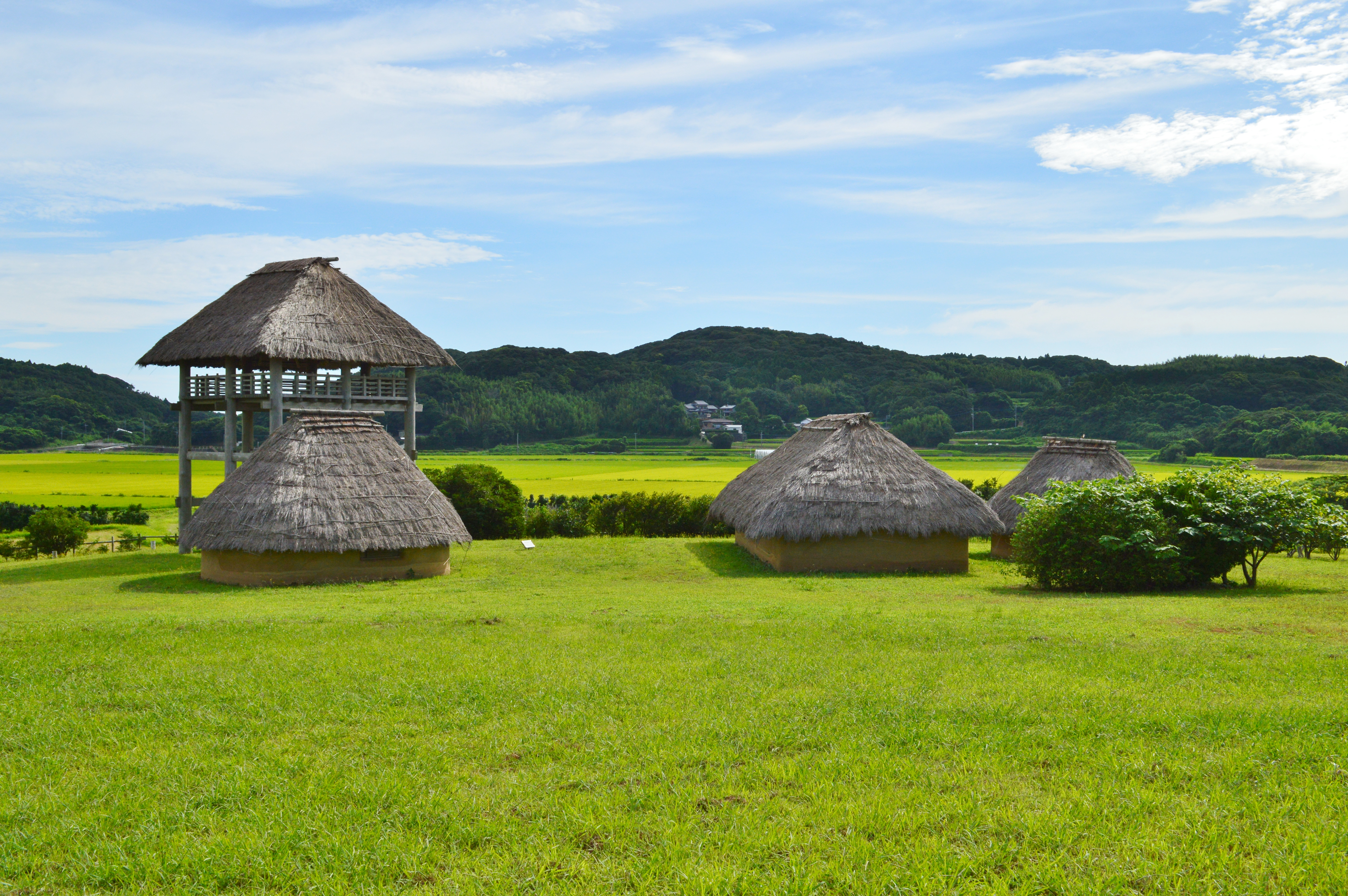
Watchtower and buildings

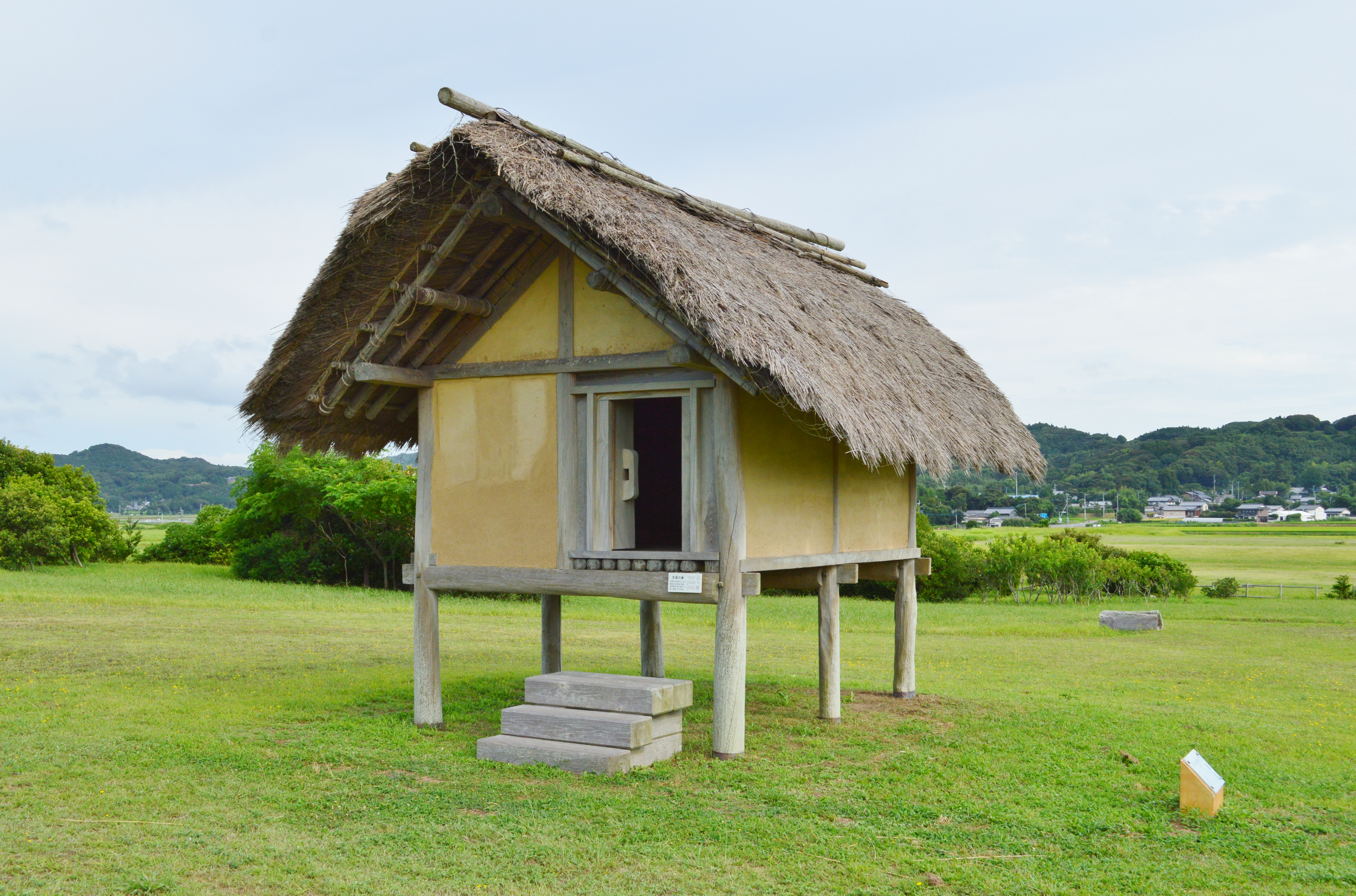
Trading storehouse

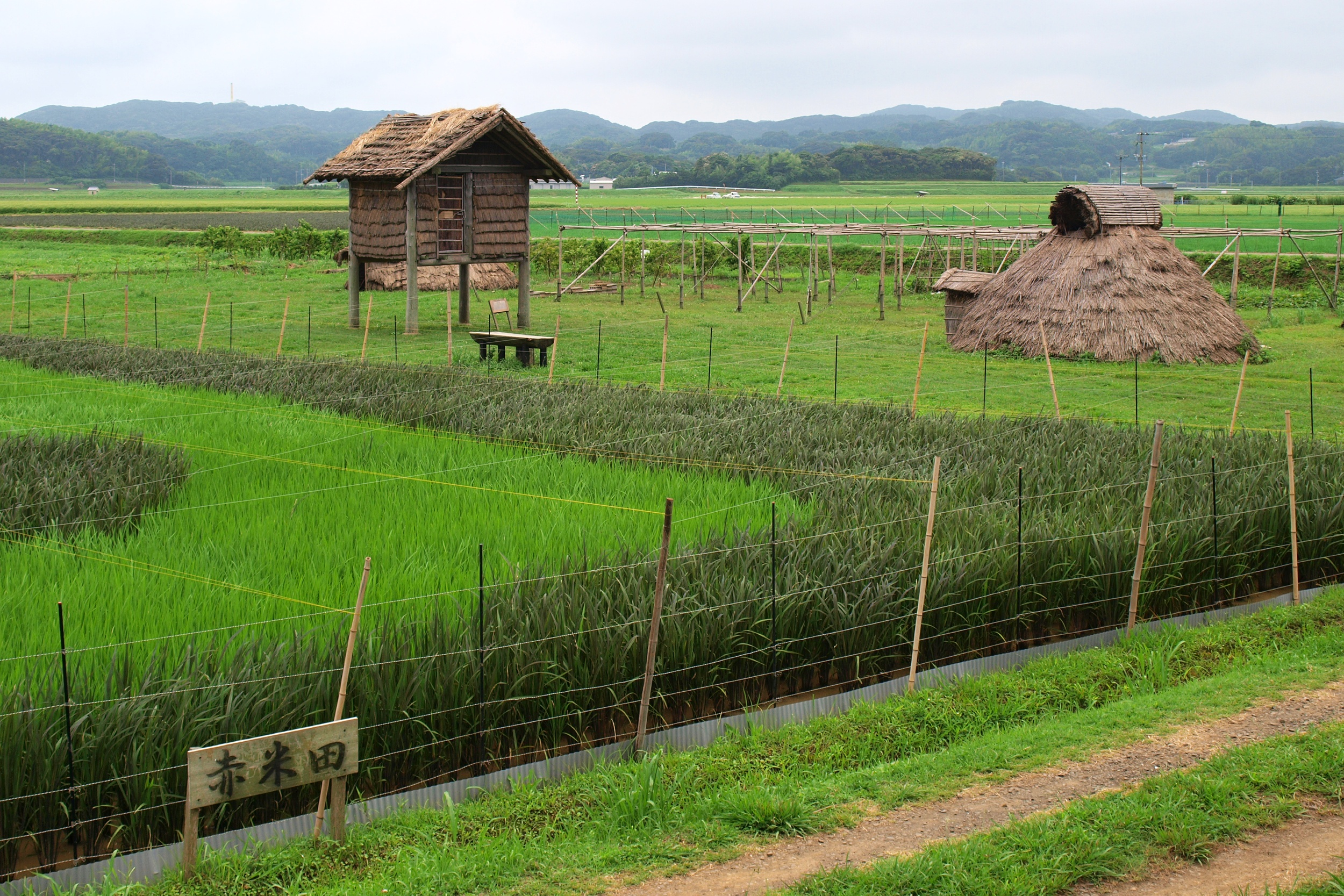
Pit dwelling and restored red rice field

== See also ==
- List of Historic Sites of Japan (Nagasaki)
