= Tōnokubi Site =

Archaeological site in Tsushima, Nagasaki, Japan

- 津島遺跡 (Japanese)
- Tōnokubi Site Site Tōnokubi Site (Japan)
- Interactive map of Tōnokubi Site
- 34°39′36″N 129°28′13″E
- Type: grave
- Periods: Yayoi period
- Location: Tsushima, Nagasaki Prefecture, Japan

Site notes
- Public access: Yes (none)

Tōnokubi Site (塔の首遺跡, Tōnokubi iseki) is an archaeological site with a cluster of Yayoi period graves, located in the Kamitsushima neighborhood of Tsushima, Nagasaki Prefecture, Japan. It was designated a National Historic Site of Japan in 1977.

== Overview ==
The Tōnokubi site is located on a ridgeline west of the Kamifurusato River, north of Hitakatsu Port, at the northern tip of the island of Tsushima. Four box-shaped stone coffins were discovered during an archaeological excavation in 1971. Both Korean and Yayoi period artifacts were excavated. Most of the first stone coffin had already disappeared, but the second stone coffin was a box-shaped stone coffin built at right angles to the ridgeline, made of slabs of stone, with an internal length of 1.5 meters, a head width of 0.45 meters at the north, and a foot width of 0.3 meters at the south. Yayoi pottery was buried along the foot of the northern wall of the coffin, and one bronze bracelet and glass beads were also discovered. The third stone coffin was made of sandstone slabs and also had paving stones. The sarcophagus was 1.75 meters long, 0.4 meters wide at the eastern head and 0.35 meters wide at the western base, with three huge flat stone slabs forming the ceiling. Inside the coffin, grave goods included seven bronze bracelets (four for the left arm and three for the right arm) and a wide-bladed bronze spear, which were placed on both side walls, and a piece of a Korean earthenware pot, numerous small glass beads, and tubular beads buried at the head. Coffin No. 4 is a box-shaped sarcophagus at the highest point, perpendicular to the ridgeline, 1.95 meters long and 0.45 meters wide, with a bronze mirror, an iron axe, small glass beads, earthenware, and other grave goods buried in the center of the coffin.

The site is about a five-minute walk from Hitakatsu Port.

== See also ==
- List of Historic Sites of Japan (Nagasaki)
