= Hirado Dutch Trading Post =

- 平戸和蘭商館 (Japanese)
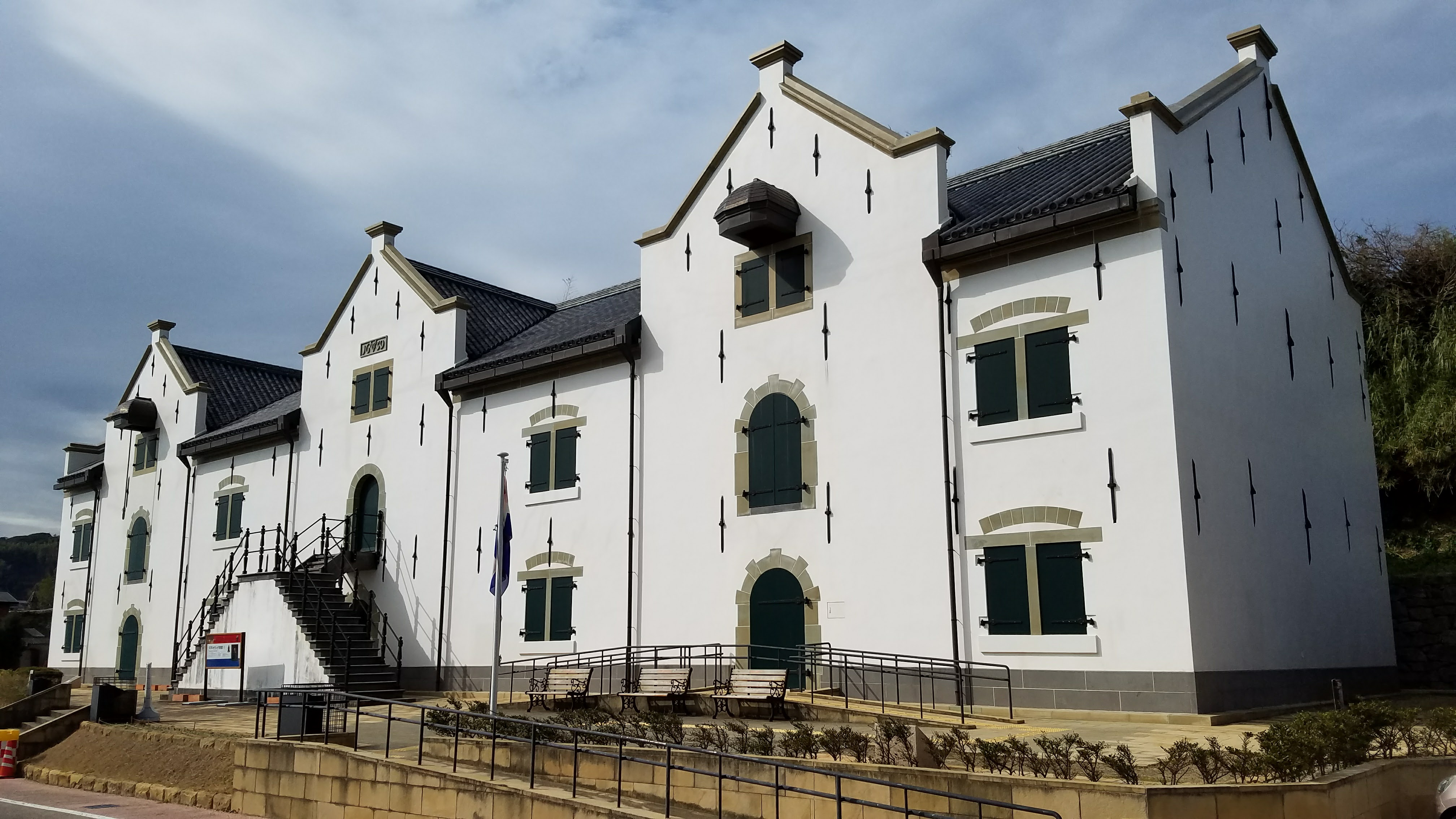
- Hirado Dutch Trading Post reconstruction

- Hirado Dutch Trading Post Hirado Dutch Trading Post (Japan)
- Interactive map of Hirado Dutch Trading Post
- 33°22′22″N 129°33′25″E
- Periods: Edo period
- Location: Hirado, Nagasaki, Japan
- Region: Kyushu

Site notes
- Public access: No

The Hirado Dutch Trading Post (平戸和蘭商館, Hirado Oranda shōkan ato) was a trading base of the Dutch East India Company on the island of Hirado, Nagasaki Prefecture Japan. It was established in 1609 and lasted for 33 years. The site was designated a National Historic Site of Japan in 1922.

== Overview ==
Jacques Specx was a Dutch merchant, who founded the trade on Japan and Korea in 1609. Jacques Specx received the support of William Adams to obtain extensive trading rights from Tokugawa Ieyasu, on 24 August 1609, which allowed him to establish a trading factory in Hirado on 20 September 1609. The building was constructed under the guidance of Matsura Takanobu, daimyō of Hirado Domain, who had 72 private houses demolished to make space for it on the waterfront. In the early Edo period, Japan actively traded with other countries, and ships from China, Portugal, and other countries arrived in Nagasaki. As the amount of trade increased dramatically, and construction of a large warehouse was undertaken to store the enormous amount of goods and to alleviate congestion in Nagasaki harbor. According to the diary of the Dutch Trading Post Chief and other records, the company initially rented a single house with a storehouse attached, and as trade expanded, the facilities were expanded and improved in succession in 1612, 1616, 1618, 1623, 1637, and 1639. In particular, the large warehouses built in 1637 and 1639 after trade was halted for five years from 1628 due to the Taiowan Incident (a dispute by the Dutch over trade with China in Taiwan) were a symbol of the company's robust trade.

The main stone warehouse, 46 meters long and 13 meters wide, is regarded as the first Western-style building to be constructed in Japan. Although overseas travel by Japanese and the arrival of Portuguese and other foreign ships were banned due to the national isolation policy, the Dutch East Indies Company was allowed to remain, and (excluding China) had a monopoly on Japan's trade until the late Bakumatsu period. However, on November 9, 1640, under the orders of Shogun Tokugawa Iemitsu, the Dutch warehouse at Hirado was destroyed. The pretext given by the Tokugawa shogunate was that the building displayed the date of 1639 on its gable. As this date was per the Western calendar, which was based on Christianity, and thus violated Japan's ban on Christianity. However, the main reason was the shogunate wanted to remove any direct contact between a local daimyō (i.e. Hirado Domain) and foreign powers. The Dutch, led by François Caron who had succeeded Nicolaes Couckebacker as the VOC opperhoofd, were forced to relocate to Dejima, Nagasaki in May 1641, which kept all contact and trade under the direct supervision of the shogunate. Afterwards, the site of the Dutch Trading Post continued to be used by the townspeople of Hirado. A map of the area from the mid-Edo period still contained place names such as "Dutch Well" and "Dutch River", and fragments of the walls of the Dutch warehouse survived into modern times. A full scale archaeological excavation was made from 1987 to 2003. The city of Hirado decided to reconstruct the building as it would have appeared in 1640 based on the foundation stones and on contemporary drawings and written descriptions, and to open the site as a museum and tourist attraction in 2011.

== See also ==
- List of Historic Sites of Japan (Nagasaki)
