= Magarizaki Kofun Cluster =

Archeological site in Japan

- 曲崎古墳群 (Japanese)
- Magarizaki Kofun Cluster Magarizaki Kofun Cluster (Japan)
- Interactive map of Magarizaki Kofun Cluster
- 32°45′05″N 129°59′20″E
- Type: Kofun
- Periods: Kofun period
- Location: Nagasaki, Japan
- Region: Kyushu

History
- Built: c.5th - 7th century

Site notes
- Public access: Yes (no facilities)

The Magarizaki Kofun Cluster (曲崎古墳群) is a group of Kofun period burial mounds, located in the Makishima neighborhood of the city of Nagasaki, Nagasaki Prefecture Japan. The tumulus was designated a National Historic Site of Japan in 1978.

== Overview ==
Makishima Island is located 500 meters offshore Tachibana Bay of the Amakusa Sea, between the Nagasaki Peninsula and the Shimabara Peninsula. At its eastern end is a beak-shaped gravel bar called "Magarizaki", which in 1940 was discovered to contain a group of tombs is a group of piled stone mounds. These burial mounds extend over an area 400 meters north-to-south by 50 meters east-to-west, at an elevation of four meters above sea level. Thus far, 101 burial mounds have been confirmed, and there are also about 500 more mounds whose nature is unknown. The burial mounds are small, with the largest being 15 meters in diameter, and most are even to eight meters in diameter or less. The main burial facilities are horizontal-type stone burial chambers constructed of slab-shaped stones in the lower half, and round pebbles and broken stones are piled up in the upper half. The presence of a passageway has not been fully confirmed, but it is possible that these tumuli are similar to the pit-type horizontal-entrance stone burial chambers found in other locations in Fukuoka and Saga Prefectures. Grave goods including glass beads, jars, and Sue ware pots have been excavated, from which the construction date of these burial mounds is estimated to be the late Kofun period, between the end of the 5th century and the beginning of the 7th century.

The site is about a 37-minute drive from Nagasaki Station on the JR Kyushu Nagasaki Main Line.

== See also ==
- List of Historic Sites of Japan (Nagasaki)
