= Namban =

Small locality in Western Australia

Namban is a small locality in Western Australia with the post code 6512. It is north of Moora, Western Australia, and south-east of the Watheroo National Park.
