= Iki Province =

Former province of Japan

Iki Province 壱岐国
- Province of Japan
- 7th century–1871
- Map of Japanese provinces (1868) with Iki Province highlighted
- Capital: Ishida District
- History
  - Established: 7th century
  - Disestablished: 1871
- Today part of: Iki, Nagasaki

Iki Province (壱岐国, Iki no Kuni; Japanese pronunciation: [í.k̟ʲì (nò̞ kɯ̈̀.ɲ̟ì)]) was a province of Japan which consisted of the Iki Islands, now a part of modern Nagasaki Prefecture. Its abbreviated name was Isshū (壱州). Iki is classified as one of the provinces of the Saikaidō. Under the Engishiki classification system, Iki was ranked as an "inferior country" (下国) and a "far country" (遠国).

== History ==
The Iki Islands have been inhabited since the Japanese Paleolithic era, and numerous artifacts from the Jōmon, Yayoi and Kofun periods have been found by archaeologists, indicating continuous human occupation and activity. In the Chinese Weizhi Worenchuan (Japanese 魏志倭人伝, Gishi Wajinden), part of the Records of the Three Kingdoms dating from the 3rd century AD, mention is made of a country called "Ikikoku", (一支国), located on an archipelago east of the Korean Peninsula. Archaeologists have tentatively identified this with the large Yayoi period settlement of Harunotsuji (原の辻), one of the largest to have been discovered in Japan, where artifacts uncovered indicate a close contact with the Japanese islands and the Asian mainland. It is also mentioned in the Weilüe, the Book of Liang and the Book of Sui.

The islands were organized as Iki Province under the Ritsuryō reforms in the latter half of the seventh century, and the name "Iki-no-kuni" appears on wooden markers found in the imperial capital of Nara.

The exact location of the provincial capital is not known, but is traditionally believed to have been in the former town of Ashibe, in former Ishida District. where the ruins of the Kokubun-ji of Iki Province have been discovered. Two shrines vie for the title of Ichinomiya of the province: the Amenotanagao-Jinja (天手長男神社), in former town of Gonoura and the Ko-Jinja (興神社), in Ashibe After the abolition of the han system in July 1871, Iki Province became part of "Hirado Prefecture" from 1871, which then became part of Nagasaki Prefecture.

== Historical districts ==
- Iki District
  - Iki District (壱岐郡) - absorbed Ishida District on April 1, 1896; now dissolved
  - Ishida District (石田郡) - merged into Iki District on April 1, 1896
