= Iki, Nagasaki =

Iki 壱岐市
- City
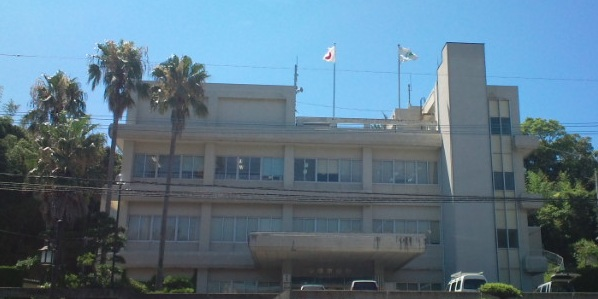
- Iki City Hall

- Flag Seal

- Location of Iki in Nagasaki Prefecture

- Coordinates: 33°44′59″N 129°41′29″E
- Country: Japan
- Region: Kyushu
- Prefecture: Nagasaki Prefecture
- First official recorded: 200 AD
- City settled: April 1, 2004

Government
  - - Mayor: Hirokazu Shirakawa (since April 2008)

Area
  - Total: 138.57 km^{2} (53.50 sq mi)

Population (November 1, 2022)
  - Total: 25,042
  - Density: 202/km^{2} (520/sq mi)
- Time zone: UTC+9 (Japan Standard Time)
- Phone number: 0920-48-1111
- Address: Conoura-cho, Honnumafuse 562, Iki-shi, Nagasaki-ken 811-5193
- Climate: Cfa
- Website: www.city.iki.nagasaki.jp
- Symbols
- Bird: Japanese white-eye
- Flower: Narcissus
- Tree: Podocarpaceae

Iki (壱岐市, Iki-shi; Japanese pronunciation: [í.k̟ʲì, ì.k̟ʲi̥.ɕì]) is a city on the island of Iki, in Nagasaki Prefecture, Japan. As of November 2022, the city has an estimated population of 25,042 and a population density of 202 persons per km^{2}. The total area is 138.57 km^{2}.

== Geography ==
Iki is located in the Tsushima Strait, approximately 80 kilometres (43 nmi) west of Fukuoka on mainland Kyushu. The city consists of five inhabited and 17 uninhabited islands, and its entire area is within the Iki-Tsushima Quasi-National Park.

=== Climate ===
Climate data for Isida, Iki (2003−2020 normals, extremes 2003−present)
Month	Jan	Feb	Mar	Apr	May	Jun	Jul	Aug	Sep	Oct	Nov	Dec	Year
Record high °C (°F)	19.0 (66.2)	20.2 (68.4)	22.7 (72.9)	25.1 (77.2)	29.1 (84.4)	31.7 (89.1)	34.3 (93.7)	35.0 (95.0)	33.7 (92.7)	30.2 (86.4)	25.0 (77.0)	23.4 (74.1)	35.0 (95.0)
Mean daily maximum °C (°F)	9.6 (49.3)	10.9 (51.6)	13.6 (56.5)	17.7 (63.9)	21.8 (71.2)	24.3 (75.7)	28.3 (82.9)	30.1 (86.2)	26.7 (80.1)	22.5 (72.5)	17.6 (63.7)	12.0 (53.6)	19.6 (67.3)
Daily mean °C (°F)	6.4 (43.5)	7.7 (45.9)	10.4 (50.7)	14.3 (57.7)	18.4 (65.1)	21.5 (70.7)	25.5 (77.9)	27.1 (80.8)	24.1 (75.4)	19.5 (67.1)	14.3 (57.7)	8.6 (47.5)	16.5 (61.7)
Mean daily minimum °C (°F)	2.6 (36.7)	3.9 (39.0)	6.6 (43.9)	10.8 (51.4)	15.2 (59.4)	19.3 (66.7)	23.5 (74.3)	24.7 (76.5)	21.8 (71.2)	16.4 (61.5)	10.3 (50.5)	4.5 (40.1)	13.3 (55.9)
Record low °C (°F)	−4.9 (23.2)	−5.6 (21.9)	−1.9 (28.6)	1.8 (35.2)	7.1 (44.8)	12.3 (54.1)	17.6 (63.7)	17.7 (63.9)	13.5 (56.3)	7.3 (45.1)	1.2 (34.2)	−2.7 (27.1)	−5.6 (21.9)
Average precipitation mm (inches)	65.7 (2.59)	75.4 (2.97)	116.5 (4.59)	137.9 (5.43)	141.2 (5.56)	257.3 (10.13)	327.3 (12.89)	249.0 (9.80)	150.2 (5.91)	106.5 (4.19)	90.9 (3.58)	80.0 (3.15)	1,797.8 (70.78)
Average rainy days (≥ 1.0 mm)	7.8	8.9	9.2	8.9	8.1	10.3	11.0	8.9	9.8	6.7	8.0	8.4	106
Source 1: JMA
Source 2: JMA

Climate data for Ashibe, Iki (1991−2020 normals, extremes 1977−present)
Month	Jan	Feb	Mar	Apr	May	Jun	Jul	Aug	Sep	Oct	Nov	Dec	Year
Record high °C (°F)	18.6 (65.5)	21.2 (70.2)	22.5 (72.5)	26.9 (80.4)	30.1 (86.2)	31.8 (89.2)	34.6 (94.3)	35.2 (95.4)	34.0 (93.2)	29.8 (85.6)	25.7 (78.3)	22.7 (72.9)	34.6 (94.3)
Mean daily maximum °C (°F)	8.7 (47.7)	9.7 (49.5)	12.7 (54.9)	17.2 (63.0)	21.5 (70.7)	24.3 (75.7)	28.1 (82.6)	29.7 (85.5)	26.1 (79.0)	21.6 (70.9)	16.4 (61.5)	11.2 (52.2)	18.9 (66.1)
Daily mean °C (°F)	6.2 (43.2)	6.9 (44.4)	9.7 (49.5)	13.7 (56.7)	17.7 (63.9)	20.9 (69.6)	24.9 (76.8)	26.3 (79.3)	23.1 (73.6)	18.7 (65.7)	13.7 (56.7)	8.5 (47.3)	15.9 (60.6)
Mean daily minimum °C (°F)	3.7 (38.7)	4.3 (39.7)	7.0 (44.6)	10.8 (51.4)	14.8 (58.6)	18.5 (65.3)	22.7 (72.9)	23.9 (75.0)	21.0 (69.8)	16.4 (61.5)	11.0 (51.8)	5.8 (42.4)	13.3 (56.0)
Record low °C (°F)	−5.5 (22.1)	−5.6 (21.9)	−1.5 (29.3)	1.8 (35.2)	9.0 (48.2)	12.0 (53.6)	16.6 (61.9)	17.4 (63.3)	14.4 (57.9)	6.6 (43.9)	1.7 (35.1)	−3.4 (25.9)	−5.6 (21.9)
Average precipitation mm (inches)	76.1 (3.00)	78.6 (3.09)	127.8 (5.03)	148.7 (5.85)	165.0 (6.50)	273.1 (10.75)	316.1 (12.44)	250.9 (9.88)	173.7 (6.84)	94.1 (3.70)	97.5 (3.84)	79.4 (3.13)	1,881 (74.05)
Average rainy days (≥ 1.0 mm)	8.5	8.3	10.1	9.4	8.9	11.6	10.9	9.5	10.4	7.3	7.9	7.8	110.6
Mean monthly sunshine hours	124.9	138.3	169.8	190.2	199.4	134.0	174.5	195.0	159.2	174.2	146.9	133.8	1,940.2
Source 1: JMA
Source 2: JMA

== History ==
The Iki Islands have been inhabited since the Japanese Paleolithic era, and numerous artifacts from the Jōmon, Yayoi and Kofun periods have been found. The islands were organized as Iki Province under the Ritsuryō reforms in the latter half of the seventh century. Following the establishment of the Tokugawa shogunate in the Edo period, the islands came under the rule of Hirado Domain.

Following the Meiji restoration, Iki became part of Nagasaki Prefecture, and was organized into Iki District and Ishida District, with a total of 22 villages. These were consolidated into 12 villages by 1889, and Ishida District was abolished in 1896. Mushozu was raised to town status in 1925, followed by Katsumoto in 1935 and Takawa in 1947. Gonoura was established in 1955, and Takawa was renamed Ashibe. Ishida was raised to town status in 1970.

The modern city of Iki was established on March 1, 2004, from the merger of the towns of Ashibe, Gonoura, Ishida and Katsumoto (all from Iki District).

== Economy ==
The island has abundant groundwater reserves, and agriculture is widely practiced by the local inhabitants. Rice and tobacco are the primary cash crops. Commercial fishing and whaling, once the mainstay of the local economy, have been largely restricted since the 1980s, although sea urchin, sardine, mackerel, abalone and kombu are harvested. Tourism is a growing sector of the local economy.

== Transportation ==
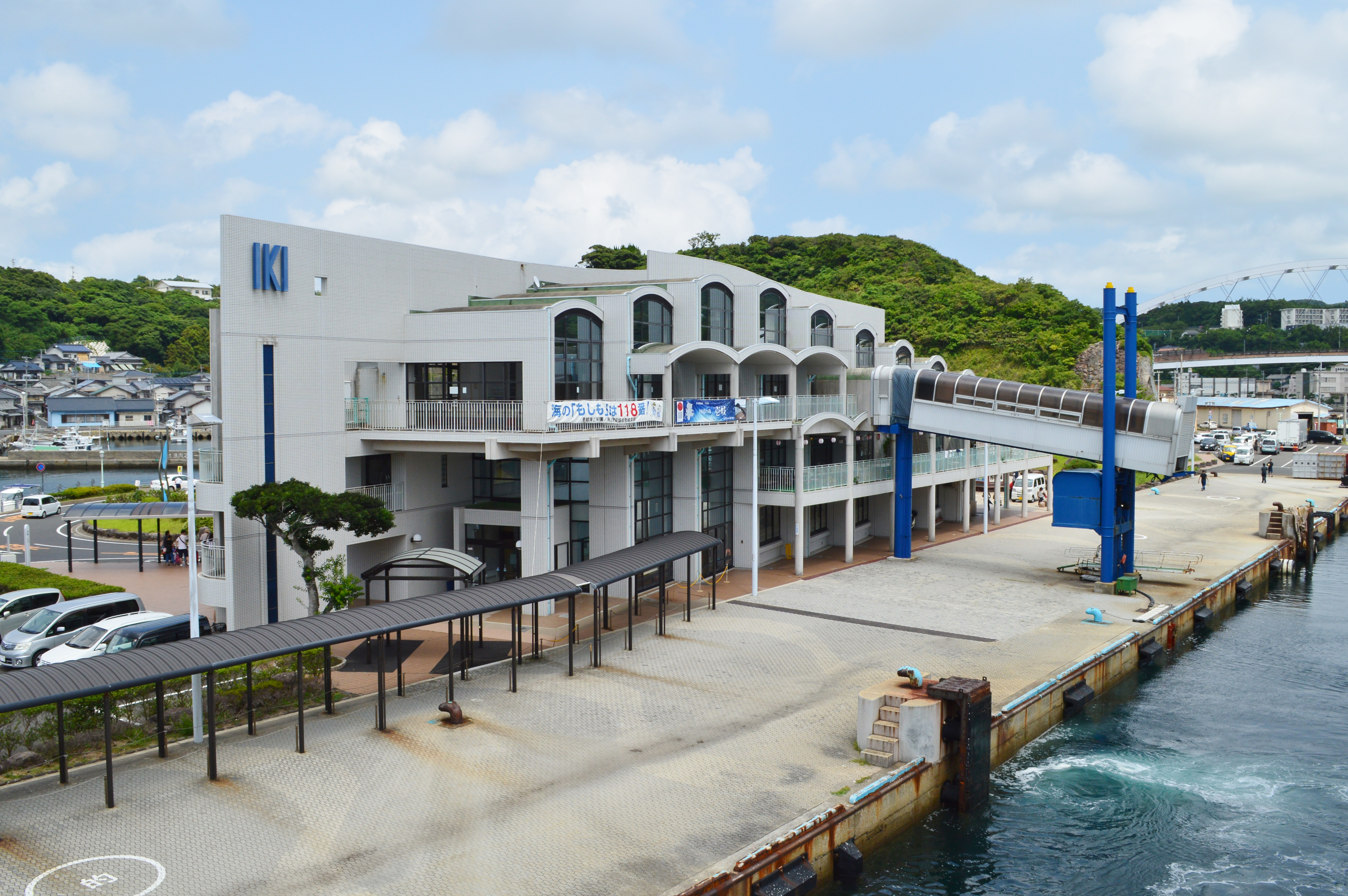
Gōnoura Port, A main gate on Iki Island.

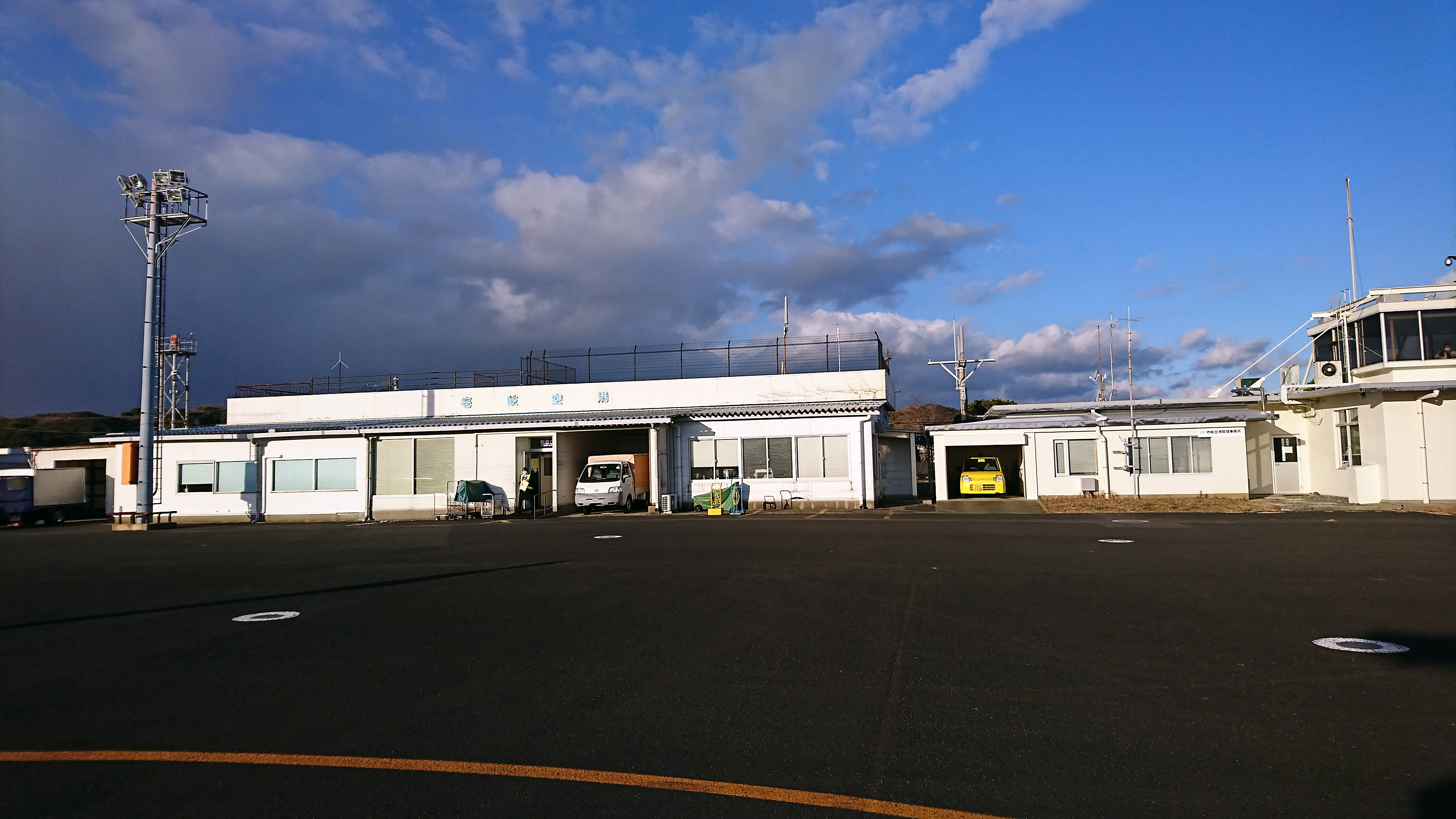
Iki Airport

Iki Island has ferry terminals in Ashibe, Ishida and Gōnoura, which connect Iki to mainland Japan. Located on the east coast Iki Airport (IKI/RJDB) connects the island to Nagasaki. Japan National Route 382 connects the hamlets of the island together, and the bus company "Iki-kotsu" provides for public transport.

== Sister cities ==
- (Japan) Suwa, Nagano, since May 24, 1994

== See also ==
- Iki Province
