= Shimabara Hantō Prefectural Natural Park =

Prefectural Natural park in Japan

- 島原半島県立自然公園
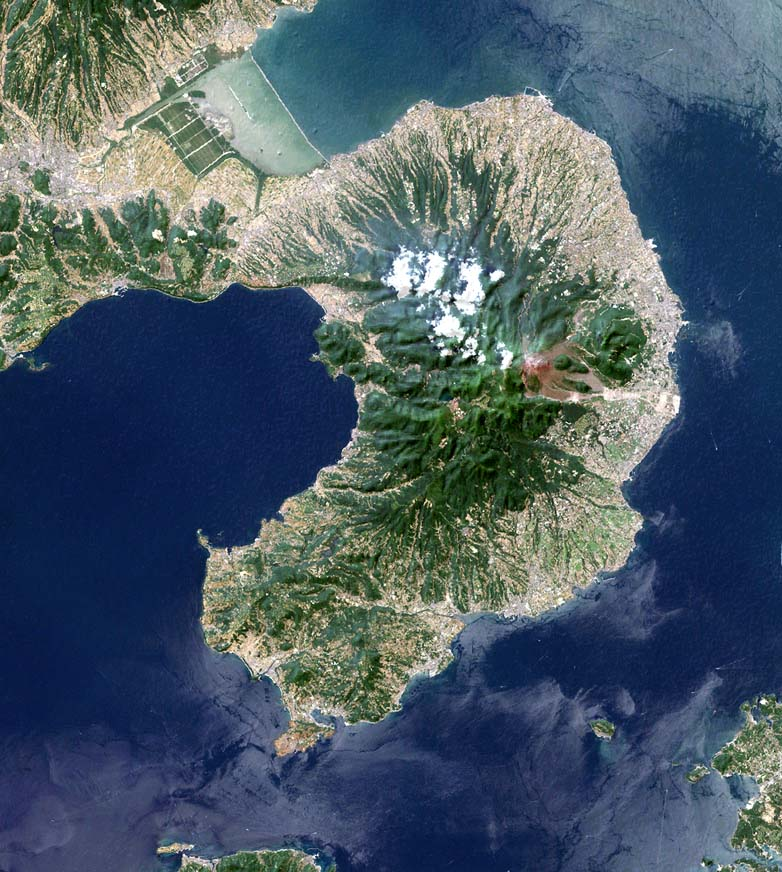
- Shimabara Peninsula
- Interactive map of Shimabara Hantō Prefectural Natural Park
- Location: Nagasaki Prefecture, Japan
- Area: 18.35 km^{2} (7.08 sq mi)
- Established: 20 January 1970

Shimabara Hantō Prefectural Natural Park (島原半島県立自然公園, Shimabara Hantō kenritsu shizen kōen) is a Prefectural Natural Park in Nagasaki Prefecture, Japan. The park was established in 1970.

== See also ==
- National Parks of Japan
- Shimabara Rebellion
