= Hirofumi Yamashita =

Japanese ichthyologist and environmentalist

- Born: 1934-02-19; Nagasaki Japan
- Died: 2000-07-21
- Education: Kochi University
- Awards: Goldman Environmental Prize (1998)
- Scientific career
- Fields: Ichthyology; environmentalist

Hirofumi Yamashita (山下 弘文, Yamashita Hirofumi) (died 2000) was a Japanese ichthyologist and environmentalist.

For 25 years, he opposed the reclamation project in Isahaya Bay, one of the world's largest wetlands, compelling the Japanese government to scale back the massive dike project and reevaluate the environmental costs of reclamation.

He was awarded the Goldman Environmental Prize in 1998 for his efforts on marine protection.

== Biography ==
Hirofumi Yamashita was born in Nagasaki as the eldest son. Due to his father’s career change, the family moved to China during his elementary school years, where he attended the Nanking First Japanese National School. A sickly and introverted child, Yamashita enjoyed children’s magazines such as Kaigun (“The Navy”), and dreamed of becoming a naval kamikaze pilot.

Around the fourth grade, while relocating from Nanking to Bampu (now part of modern-day Myanmar), he experienced the war firsthand when the train he was riding was strafed by American aircraft. Continuous air raids followed, leaving little room for regular schooling—daily life revolved around military drills and labor at nearby bases.

After Japan’s defeat, Japanese civilians were sent to repatriation camps in Shanghai before returning to Japan. Yamashita’s family also came back to Nagasaki, only to find their house destroyed by the atomic bombing and many maternal relatives lost. They then moved to his father’s hometown in the Goto Islands.

In Goto Islands, Yamashita resumed school, where meeting a biology teacher became a turning point in his life. The teacher recognized his curiosity toward living creatures and entrusted him with tending to the school’s garden and animals instead of attending class. Rising to these expectations, Yamashita spent his summer vacation collecting plants and creating specimens, eventually winning an award at the school festival. Through this experience, he realized that “to understand living things, one must also study language, geography, and English,” and began to study intensely, improving his academic performance dramatically.

After entering high school, he founded the school’s biology club with friends and devoted himself to dissection and specimen-making. Upon graduation, he worked as a junior high school teacher before entering university. Initially holding right-wing beliefs, he later shifted toward leftist thought and became involved in social movements. After graduation, he worked for the prefectural tax office and later transferred to the Fisheries Experimental Station, a long-held aspiration. For the next 23 years, he was active in the General Council of Trade Unions of Japan (Sōhyō), leading strikes and engaging in anti-nuclear and anti-pollution campaigns—marking the start of his career as a social activist.

== Interest in Biology and Environmental Awareness ==
During his childhood in China, Yamashita was deeply impressed by a female surgeon working at a hospital run by relatives. Though not a strong student at the time, he admired the medical profession, and this encounter sparked his lifelong curiosity about life and science.

Later, after catching a large snakehead fish in China and raising it in a pond at home, he became absorbed in observing and caring for living creatures. Using scalpels and tweezers he had obtained from the hospital, he performed dissections, made specimens, and sketched his observations. This early curiosity eventually grew into a broader interest in biology and the natural sciences.

When Yamashita revisited China 38 years later, he was struck by the strong eagerness to learn among Chinese people and the realities of rural life. Witnessing this, he felt alarmed by Japan’s neglect of agriculture and fisheries in its pursuit of economic growth, leading to declining self-sufficiency. From that point on, he began to view agriculture, fisheries, and environmental degradation as interconnected social issues. This intellectual and moral transformation laid the foundation for his later opposition to the Isahaya Bay reclamation project and his lifelong commitment to wetland conservation.

== Achievements & Impact ==
From the early 1970s, Hirofumi Yamashita became a central figure in the movement to protect the tidal flats of Isahaya Bay, opposing the government’s large-scale reclamation project. Around 1973–74, he co-founded the Society to Protect the Nature of Isahaya Bay (諫早湾の自然を守る会), which organized local residents and scientists to monitor and preserve the area’s rich ecosystem. For more than six years, Yamashita conducted continuous field studies of the bay’s flora and fauna, compiling scientific data to demonstrate the ecological value of the tidal flats — home to endemic species such as the mudskipper (Periophthalmus modestus) and a vital habitat for migratory birds.

Yamashita's motivation to engage in tidal flat conservation stemmed from his encounters with people living self-sufficiently around Isahaya Bay. They obtained their daily sustenance by gathering seafood and had no habit of “buying” food. However, upon learning that the area would later be eliminated by a land reclamation project, Yamashita was shocked and began conservation activities alone. The initial government plan aimed to reclaim approximately 10,000 hectares of tidal flats for increased food production. However, massive opposition campaigns by local fishermen and citizens forced its cancellation. Subsequently, the government rebranded the project as “for disaster prevention purposes,” but Yamashita and his supporters continued to oppose it.

Later, the government constructed tidal embankments and floodgates, killing many water birds and pushing species like the mudskipper and the mudfish to the brink of extinction, causing numerous wildlife species to vanish. Yamashita asserted, “The tidal flats of Isahaya Bay are not merely fishing grounds; they are Japan's largest treasure trove of genetic resources, possessing immense biodiversity, and are a heritage of humankind.” He also stated, “Saving the tidal flats is the same as saving our own lives,” and devoted his full efforts to their restoration and preservation.

In 1991, he became the representative of the Japan Wetlands Action Network (JAWAN) , expanding his focus from local activism to national and international wetland conservation efforts. Throughout the 1990s, Yamashita played a leading role in publicizing the environmental and economic costs of the Isahaya reclamation project, urging the government to reassess its scale and purpose. His investigations also exposed flaws in official environmental impact assessments and the suppression of government data, contributing to broader debates over transparency and accountability in Japan’s public works projects.

Following the 1997 closure of the Isahaya Bay dike, Yamashita continued to advocate for reopening the floodgates and restoring the wetlands. Despite social isolation, threats, and even financial offers from the Ministry of Agriculture, Forestry and Fisheries, he remained steadfast in his principles. His tireless advocacy helped bring national and international attention to the issue, culminating in his receipt of the Goldman Environmental Prize in 1998 — one of the world’s most prestigious awards for grassroots environmental activism.

In addition to his activism, Yamashita was a prolific writer, publishing numerous books and reports on wetlands, coastal ecology, and environmental policy, including his autobiography To Die in Isahaya (2001). His life’s work not only contributed to the preservation of Japan’s tidal ecosystems but also inspired greater public awareness of the need for ecological integrity and government accountability in environmental decision-making.

== Writing ==
- A Report from the Ariake Sea and Isahaya Bay: An Interim Critique of the Comprehensive Development Plan for Southern Nagasaki Prefecture (Nagasaki Prefectural Center for Local Autonomy Studies, 1977)
- Against Environmental Destruction (Ado Printing, 1979)
- Defending the Tidal Flats: The Ariake Sea and Isahaya Bay — A Resident’s Struggle Against Development and Environmental Assessment (Musashino Shobo, 1980)
- Energy Storage Reportage (Gijutsu to Ningen [Technology and Humanity], 1983)
- Who Saved the Tidal Flats? Fishermen and Living Creatures of the Ariake Sea (Rural Culture Association Japan, 1989)
- The Gas Explosion: The Truth Behind the Shizuoka Station Catastrophe (Kage Shobo, 1991)
- The Rich Sea and the Island of Wild Deer: Letters from Nozaki Island, Goto Archipelago (Hokuto Publishing, 1992)
- The Ramsar Convention and Japan’s Wetlands: Proposals for Wetland Conservation and Coexistence (Shinzansha Publishing, 1993)
- The Footsteps of Japan’s Wetland Protection Movement: The Disappearance of Japan’s Largest Tidal Flat—Ariake Sea, Isahaya Bay (Shinzansha Publishing, 1994)
- Tidal Flats of Western Japan: The Last Paradise of Abundant Life (Nampo Shinsha, 1996)
- The Isahaya Bay Mudskipper Controversy (Nampo Shinsha, 1998)
- To Die in Isahaya: The Autobiography of Hirofumi Yamashita (Nampo Shinsha, 2001)
