= 1991 Mount Unzen eruption =

Volcanic disaster in Nagasaki Prefecture, Japan

Coordinates: 32°45′41″N 130°17′55″E

1991 eruption of Mount Unzen Heisei eruption
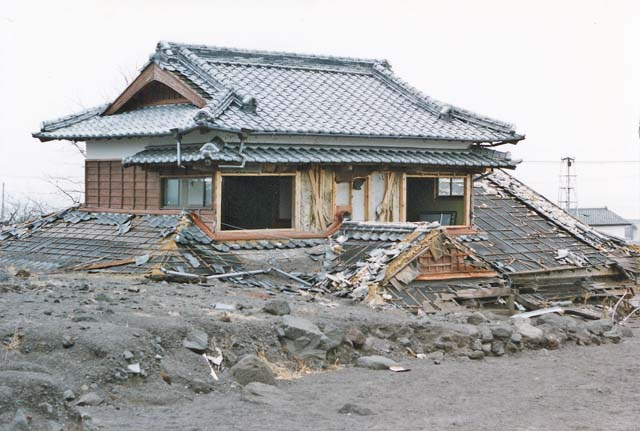
- Damage resulting from eruption of Mt. Unzen
- Volcano: Mount Unzen
- Start date: November 17, 1990
- End date: February 16, 1995
- Location: Nagasaki Prefecture, Japan
- VEI: 3
- Impact: 44 dead or missing

Maps
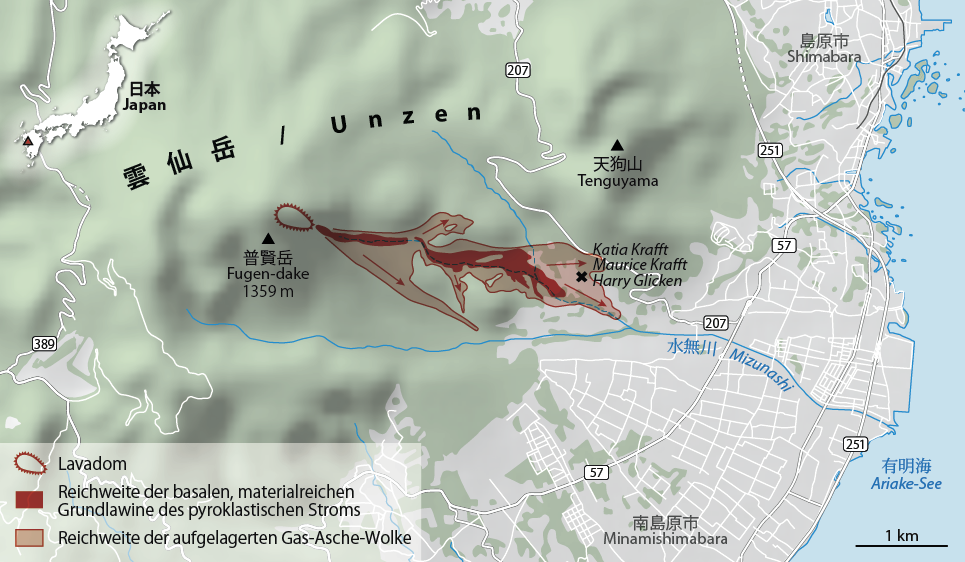
- A map of the large-scale pyroclastic flow (and its surge) that occurred at 4:08 pm on June 3, 1991.

Mount Unzen in Nagasaki Prefecture, Japan, erupted in 1991. Volcanic activity began in November 1990, and a large-scale pyroclastic flow occurred on June 3, 1991, causing extensive damage. In total, 43 people were killed or went missing. The volcanic activity finally subsided in 1995. The event was the deadliest volcanic disaster in post-war Japan until the 2014 eruption of Mount Ontake.

The event is known in Japanese as the Heisei eruption (平成大噴火, Heisei daifunka).

== November 1990 to May 1991 ==
Following the 1792 eruption, Mt. Unzen remained dormant until it erupted again in November 1990.

A slow-building active phase began in 1968, with the first earthquake swarms continuing until 1975. Large amounts of volcanic gas were ejected by Fugen-dake, which affected about thirty cedar trees. In 1975, bird and animal carcasses were found in the surrounding area, and emissions of high concentrations of carbon dioxide from rock fractures were detected. Volcanic gases were also reported to have erupted from this area during the 1792 eruption. Earthquakes occurred sporadically from 1975 onward, but from June to September 1979 there were 89 sensitive earthquakes, with strong shaking equivalent to a maximum seismic intensity of 5 . At Shimabara Onsen, there was a place where the dissolved carbon dioxide concentration increased by 30%, a sharp rise from 1975. From April 1984, swarms occurred in Tachibana Bay. A magnitude 5.7 earthquake with a seismic intensity of 5 occurred in August near the south side of Hayama. As a result of this earthquake, uplift of the Shimabara Peninsula was observed, and magma supply from Tachibana Bay began.

In November 1989, an earthquake swarm began about 20 km (12 mi) underneath and 10 km (6.2 mi) west of Fugen-dake. Over the following year, earthquakes continued, and their hypocentres gradually migrated towards the summit. Finally on November 17, 1990 (Heisei 2), the first phreatic, or steam-blast, eruptions began ejecting from two places near a shrine at the summit. These eruptions blew vaporized hot water and ash up from the two craters. In December of the same year, the volcano's state lulled, but it erupted again on February 12, 1991, and on April 3 and 4. The eruption intensified on May 9.

On May 15, the first debris flow caused by accumulated volcanic ash at the summit occurred, and a number of cracks were formed on the west side of the crater, extending in an east–west direction. After this inflation of the summit area, fresh lava was confirmed to be emerging on May 20, 1991. The lava was so viscous that it did not flow out, but instead became a dome which formed in the crater. The lava dome eventually split and collapsed into four pieces under its own weight. After that, the dome continued to grow, continuously supplied with fresh lava from the crater underneath, creating new lobes that hung down from the summit. The 1st to 13th lobes were named in the order they were formed. Collapsing of the lava dome began to occur when the lobes, pushed out by the newly supplied magma, started to give way on the slope, causing pyroclastic flows (in which debris and volcanic gases flow down the mountainside at speeds of 100 km/h).

== June 3, 1991 eruption ==
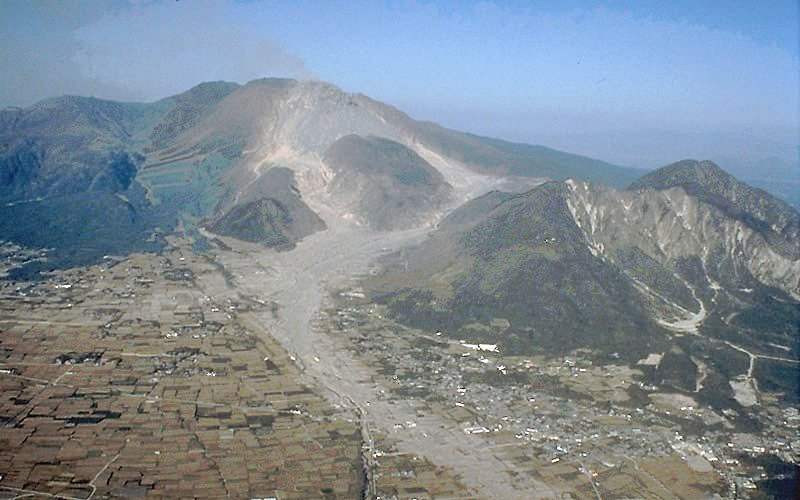
Mt. Unzen after the 1991 eruption, showing extensive pyroclastic flow and lahar deposits.

The threat of further disastrous events prompted authorities to evacuate 12,000 residents from their homes. On June 3, 1991, the volcano erupted violently, possibly as a result of depressurization of the magma column after a landslide in the crater. A pyroclastic flow triggered by the collapse of a lava dome reached 4.5 km (2.8 mi) from the crater and killed 43 scientists and journalists, including volcanologists, Katia and Maurice Krafft, and Harry Glicken.

=== Before the eruption ===
The first debris flow in the Mizunashi River (located at the foothills of Unzendake) occurred on May 15, with further flows occurring on the 19th, 20th, and 21st. Shimabara City made an evacuation recommendation to the towns in the Mizunashi River basin each time, resulting in an uneventful evacuation with no human fatalities.

On May 20, the lava dome appeared on Fugen-dake and grew in size. On May 24, part of the dome collapsed, and the first pyroclastic flow occurred. After that, smaller pyroclastic flows occurred frequently, reaching a distance of 2.5 km (1.6 mi) east of the lava dome on May 26, and 3 km (1.9 mi) on May 29. On May 26, when the tip of a pyroclastic flow approached 500 m (1,600 ft) from the nearest private houses, Shimabara City issued an evacuation recommendation for Kita-Kamikoba town, Minami-Kamikoba town, Shirataki town, Tenjin Motomachi, and Fudan Motomachi – all located in the Mizunashi River basin. The evacuation recommendation was carried out without trouble.

To capture the pyroclastic flow activity on film, media organizations chose a select spot within the evacuation advisory area. This spot was 4 km (2.5 mi) away from the lava dome, 700 m (2,300 ft) away from the Mizunashi River (where debris flows were frequent), and 40 m (130 ft) high. This shooting spot was located on the prefectural road in the village of Kita-Kamikoba, and was favored by the media because they were able to view Fugen-dake directly in front of them. The nickname "fixed point" was established. After the first pyroclastic flow on May 24, more than a dozen media members were lined up at the "fixed point". In 1991, the media had started to use color photographs in the paper, and with the Fugen-dake disaster becoming an ongoing topic of coverage, the companies started competing for color photographs. The competition became even more intense as the Mainichi Shimbun succeeded in shooting nightly pyroclastic flows on May 28.

The fact that pyroclastic flows were being recorded in clear images for the first time attracted a great deal of attention from all over the world, and many volcanologists and government officials entered the evacuation advisory area for interviews and photography. On May 28, the Ministry of Construction (at that time officials of the Public Works Research Institute) released a picture taken when entering the path of previous pyroclastic flows below the lava dome, and another group on the afternoon of June 1 or 2. After entering the tip of the deposit path, they surveyed the site for about an hour, photographed the pattern and released it.

In addition, many visitors had begun to gather around Unzendake to see the plumes. In particular, since June 2 was a Sunday, many visitors from other prefectures gathered around the Mizunashi River and observed the pyroclastic flows with binoculars and photographed them with video cameras. Traffic became heavy as a result.

However, on May 26, reporters from the Asahi Shimbun were warned that it was likely for them to be engulfed by the clouds, and in an evacuation recommendation, they were asked to leave the "fixed point" and find another area. According to a photographer who continued aerial photography of the lava dome from the helicopter, "The bottom fans out from the Sabo dam of the Mizunashi River, and if a large pyroclastic flow occurs, there is a strong possibility of it striking the 'fixed point'." The Asahi Shimbun abandoned their position and retreated past the Tsutsuno bus stop, to instead set up a point in Fukae Town outside the evacuation zone on May 28, and switched to 24-hour shooting from there. At the "fixed point", the coverage in the vicinity was limited to patrols.

Similarly, Japan's public broadcaster NHK stopped shooting from within the evacuated area from the end of May and arranged for an unmanned camera in the Kamikoba area. But until the unmanned camera was ready, the photographer who had been lowered backward was advanced to the Kamikoba area once again on June 1. The evacuation area then became smaller, since the commercial broadcasters had shot footage of bright red lava on May 30 and 31; the person in charge of the news program (who ordered the initial retreat of the front-line shooting staff) ordered more images shot like it. Kamikoba soon emerged again as a filming location of the press.

From May 15, when the debris flow evacuation advisory was issued, the fire brigade in charge of the Kamikoba district stayed either at the Minami-Kamikoba town fire brigade, or the Kita-Kamikoba town agricultural training center (which was initially an evacuation residence for locals). On May 29, due to the frequent occurrences of pyroclastic flows, they were evacuated from the firefighting station in Minami-Kamikoba town to the Shiratani Public Hall in the lower Mizunashi River, but on June 2, they returned to the Agricultural Training Center in Kita-Kamikoba town. This was because of the following reasons:

- Due to the temporary lull in rainfall, the occurrence of debris flow became more sparse, and it was judged that the area where the pyroclastic flows came out was a steep area and did not reach a gentle slope downward. The evacuation for Tenjin Motomachi and Fudano Motomachi was lifted on the 1st, as well as Shiratani. Therefore, the fire brigade were no longer allowed to stay in the towns downstream from the Kamikoba area, as the evacuation advisories were now canceled.
- On May 29, preparations for the rainy season were resumed, and so was the removal of sediment from the Mizunashi River. But wire sensors that were installed to detect occurrences of debris flows were cut off on May 26 in a series of pyroclastic flows, and their recovery was still expected. As a result, it was decided to manually monitor the upstream part of the Mizunashi River. The agricultural training center in Kita-Kamikoba was favored for this, as it was located higher than the Minami-Kamikoba fire station.
- On June 2, several reports from a press conference by the Director General of Shimabara, detailed several TV station crews breaking into homes without permission, borrowing telephones and power outlets, and littering in the area. Also, after May 26, residents would often return to recover personal belongings from their homes, or enter the Kamikoba area to do housework or farm work, and it was considered necessary to guide their evacuation in the event of an emergency. As a result, it was convenient for the agricultural training school (which was close to the "fixed point") to monitor the behavior of the press and warn any nearby locals of danger.

On June 2, all 20 members of the Kamikoba area fire brigade slept at the agricultural training institute. They remained at the training center and were on alert.

=== Eruption and pyroclastic flows ===
After 3:30 pm on June 3, small and medium-sized pyroclastic flows occurred frequently, and the first large-scale pyroclastic flow occurred at 3:57. Although this pyroclastic flow (and its resulting pyroclastic surge) did not reach the "fixed point", visibility in the vicinity deteriorated significantly as volcanic ash from the dispersing cloud covered the surroundings, in addition to the rainfall that had continued from the morning.

At 4:08 pm, the second large pyroclastic flow occurred, descending the Mizunashi River Valley and reaching 3.2 km (2.0 mi) to the east from the lava dome. Although the main body of the flow continued to follow the river, the resulting pyroclastic surge spread out in a fan shape once it had exited the valley mouth and continued further, hitting Kita-Kamikoba town (4 km (2.5 mi) away from the lava dome) and finally stopping near the Tsutsuno bus stop (5 km (3.1 mi) away). The pyroclastic flow also flowed down the Akamatsu-dani River, but changed direction due to a gust of wind from the south, allowing the residents, firefighters, and the shooting staff (who left their camera behind to capture world-famous footage of the eruption) to immediately escape the eruption.

At the "fixed point", members of the media initially left their chartered taxis and company cars on the road with their engine running, facing south so that they could escape immediately in case of an unforeseen event. However, the field of view was poor due to dispersing ash from the previous pyroclastic flow, as well as due to the presence of rain, and it was almost impossible to evacuate even from the windward side, as the pyroclastic surge that flowed from the Akamatsu-dani River would have cut them off. A fire brigade member of the agricultural training station, several hundred meters away from the "fixed point", assumed incorrectly that the roaring of the pyroclastic flow was caused by a debris flow instead, and was engulfed by the pyroclastic surge when he left the training station to check the Mizunashi River. Many members escaped from the evacuation advisory area on their own, but suffered severe burns and airway damage. As a result, 16 members of the media (including part-time students), three volcanologists (the Kraffts and Harry Glicken), 12 firefighters who were on guard, four taxi drivers, two police officers who came by police car to conduct evacuation guidance, two workers who were removing the city council election poster bulletin board, and four residents who were working in agriculture were killed. The disaster resulted in 43 dead or missing, and nine injured. The photographer of the Yomiuri Shimbun newspaper died holding his Nikon F4. The camera recorded seven frames of the pyroclastic flow, although it was discolored by heat. All of the areas surrounding the "fixed point" where many casualties occurred, were within the advised evacuation zone.

A professional video camera used by an NTV cameraman who died in the pyroclastic flow was discovered in June 2005. The camera melted due to the high temperature generated by the pyroclastic flow and was severely damaged, but the tape it contained was playable, despite having been buried under volcanic deposits for almost 15 years. The video received from the camera shows the reporters observing the first pyroclastic flow, and then continuing to report after having moved their position to the "fixed point". It also displays the police cars that announced evacuation, all unaware of the approach of the second large pyroclastic flow. The footage and sound were recorded and recovered, although heavily damaged and warped (the video ends when the cameraman notices a sound apparently associated with the generating pyroclastic flow, and asks "What's that sound?", whilst turning the camera in the direction of Mt. Fugen). This video was broadcast on October 16, 2005, and is now exhibited alongside the melted camera at the Unzendake Disaster Memorial Hall in Shimabara City.

It is unclear what caused the unprecedented size of the second, large-scale pyroclastic flow on June 3. It has been suggested that the heavy ash-laden column that towered over the main flow, collapsed during its descent, causing the surge. It has also been pointed out that when the dome collapsed, 0.5 million cubic meters of hardened lava broke off, leaving a significant collapse scar afterwards, suggesting that the size of the dome collapse (rather than the column collapse) initiated the surge. Other explanations account for the fact that previous lahars and pyroclastic flows filled the Mizunashi Valley, raising the level of the river-bed and making it more likely for the flow to "skip" ridges that would have once stopped it. According to the 2011 documentary Face au Volcan Tueur (French for Facing the Killer Volcano), the unexpected surge could have been caused by phreatic explosions as the main body of the pyroclastic flow proceeded down two waterfalls at the headwaters of the river, fragmenting the ash-particles of the avalanche and expanding the energy of the overlying gas and ash cloud.

=== Effects and aftermath ===
Pyroclastic flows continued over the next few days following the June 3 eruption; however, they were reportedly smaller and less frequent. Even so, rescue efforts and movements to recover the bodies of the victims were disrupted and stalled due to the ever-present danger. Authorities eventually managed to recover 27 bodies and bring them to the Anyoji Temple. Four of the victims' bodies were never recovered, and were reported as missing at the time, but presumed dead. Many of the recovered bodies were carbonized due to the extreme heat of the surge, and were identified by either dental records, or personal belongings they carried with them (e.g. wristwatches or cameras). Seventeen victims on the outer edges of the affected zone lived for a while, before succumbing later to their injuries (burns to their skin and lungs, or inhaled ash in their windpipe and lungs). The final victim died on August 8.

The collapse of the lava dome itself left a notable scar on the eastern side of the summit, and the pyroclastic flow and surge resulted in much damage in the Kamikoba district. Kita-Kamikoba was almost completely destroyed. Around 170 houses were devastated, many of them set alight by the intense heat of the ash. Pictures have shown that the pyroclastic flow left significant deposits near the mouth of the Mizunashi River Valley, enough to bury houses and the river itself. In contrast, the surge that detached from the flow left deposits of ash between 3 and 30 centimetres (1.2 and 11.8 in) thick; however, trees were flattened and many buildings continued burning until the next morning. The force of the surge was enough to push a car 80 metres (260 ft) down the road.

Many of the casualties of the June 3 eruption could have been avoided if the danger of pyroclastic flows had been made more apparent beforehand. While the first pyroclastic flow on May 24 was shocking, many did not understand just how lethal such events could become. A reporter stated at the time: "I knew they were quite hot, but didn't know they could be accompanied by (pyroclastic surges). I thought we could escape by car, but I didn't know the extent at which it burned."

Twenty-five days after the event, the Japan Meteorological Agency revealed that while the first dome collapse was reported, much of the mass media and local residents were in a state of confusion about the danger of pyroclastic flows, and were not particularly concerned about them overall. The media originally reported that the pyroclastic flows seen on Fugen-dake at the time were "geologically small", which many regarded as "a scale that would cause no human fatalities". On May 26, a construction worker operating a Sabo dam in the upstream area of the Mizunashi River was caught in a pyroclastic flow; he survived but was sent to hospital with burns on his arms. Many thought that such burns could be prevented by wearing a long-sleeved shirt. The danger of the phenomena was not made clear. Furthermore, the number of pyroclastic flows from May 25 to June 2 had increased to 165, and all had stopped near the Sabo dam in the upper reaches of the valley. As a result, much of the media grew accustomed to the eruptions and no longer felt like they were in any danger.

Shimabara City issued an evacuation advisory for the villages near the base of Unzen on May 26, but responded to the residents' request that patrolling police officers allow them into the area to return to their homes (in preparation for prolonged evacuation). From the same day onward, a "district name sticker" was issued, and private cars with such a sticker were given permission to enter the evacuated area. For this reason, there were many residents doing laundry and field work at homes in the zone that had been declared dangerous. In the Kamikoba area, in particular, there were many farmers who made a living by cultivating tobacco leaf, but since they had been forced to evacuate for a long time (since the May 15 debris flows), their work grew stagnant and many of them were concerned. For this reason, on June 4, in collaboration with tobacco farmers in Annaka Town (which had not been evacuated), the residents of the Kamikoba area entered the evacuation zone to perform flower filling work later than usual.

Volcanologists did not talk about the danger of pyroclastic flows initially, because they feared residents would panic, especially those still working in the evacuated area. Residents were warned not to enter the evacuation advisory area by Shimabara City and the media, but since May, no concrete image was given regarding the danger of pyroclastic flows compared to that of debris flows (which had caused significant damage previously), and most residents did not take the warnings seriously. Many misunderstood them to be mere clouds of dust. According to the "Investigation of Disaster Information Transmission and Residents' Responses during the 1991 Unzendake Eruption" conducted in 1992, 75% of local residents recognized debris flows as more dangerous than pyroclastic flows before June 2. Only 15% perceived pyroclastic flows to be more dangerous. Furthermore, only 5% of the residents in the Kamikoba area recognized pyroclastic flows as "very dangerous". As was seen in the survey results, the volcanologists' warnings were not even understood by residents living in the most dangerous areas.

On June 3, a debris flow warning was passed out due to rain that began in the morning, and a party was held in Shiratani to celebrate the winner of the Shimabara City Council election on June 2. As a result of those two factors, most residents were withdrawn from the evacuation advisory area, which resulted in fewer victims.

== Eruptions after June 3, 1991 ==
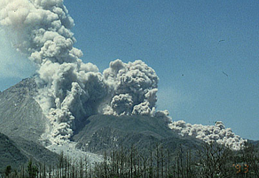
Pyroclastic flow from Mt. Unzen in 1993.

The eruption activity continued until March 1995, with a temporary pause during its course. Between 1991 and 1994, the volcano generated at least 10,000 small pyroclastic flows, destroying about 2,000 houses. From 1993 onward, the rate of lava effusion gradually decreased, and eruptions came to an end in 1995.

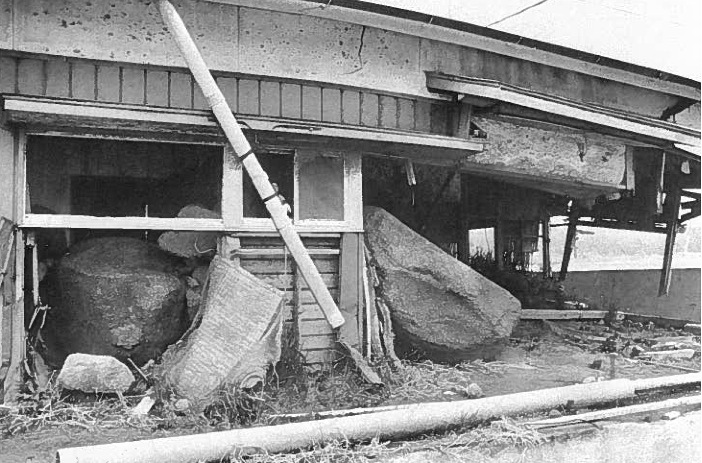
House destroyed and partially buried by lahars in the Mizunashi River valley, 1994.

The 1990–1995 eruptions of Unzen were the first eruptive activities in the world where pyroclastic flows were recorded clearly and continuously on video (in the past, many pyroclastic flows, such as those on Mt. Pelee, were recorded either as photographs or on small-scale videos).

Dome collapses and pyroclastic flows continued.

The first large-scale dome collapses and pyroclastic flows occurred after June 3 on September 15, 1991. Progressive failure of the NE flank of the lava dome started at 16:44, with major flows following at 17:59 and 18:45, before the largest pyroclastic flow at 18:54. The first flows descended towards the NE and stopped just short of Kita-Kamikoba. The main flow initially descended on the NE flank and was then deflected by Taruki height, directing it to the SE, after which it passed through the already ravaged Kita-Kamikoba, where it remobilized debris from the June 3 eruption, then continued east through the Mizunashi river valley. As the pyroclastic flow reached Onokoba, the pyroclastic surge detached from the main flow body as it continued moving 600 m (2,000 ft) to the SE, before losing its energy and stopping. The surge was powerful enough to move a car 120 m (390 ft), flatten and uproot large trees and even move large debris in Kita-Kamikoba and Onokoba. The surge destroyed the Onokaba elementary school and burned down 150 homes.

== Effects of eruption and restoration work ==
The eruptive activity caused great damage to the Shimabara Peninsula, especially Shimabara City and Fukae Town. The main factors that led to damage were debris flows and lahars, initiated by heavy rain which destabilized pyroclastic flow and ash debris previously deposited on the slopes. The Mizunashi basin, as well as the Senbongi district and parts of Shimabara were severely damaged. In addition, there was concern about the collapse of Mt. Mayuyama, which previously caused the 1792 disaster. In this eruptive activity, however, Mt. Mayuyama protected the center of Shimabara from the pyroclastic flows.

In areas other than Shimabara and Fukae, there was ash fall depending on the wind direction, and flights at Kumamoto Airport were disrupted.

Since the eruptions, heavy rains have frequently remobilised pyroclastic material, generating lahars. Dikes have been constructed in several river valleys to channel lahar flows away from vulnerable areas, and warning systems and evacuation plans have been developed and deployed.

- Among the areas destroyed by the pyroclastic flows, the area around Heisei Shinzan and the upper part of the Mizunashi River are still designated as warning areas because of the possibility of the mountain collapsing.
- The Mizunashi River was completely filled with earth and sand, and dredging was carried out. Dykes and bridges have been strengthened. In the downstream area, there was too much sediment. As a result, a new residential area was built on that sediment. In addition, a roadside station, Mizunashi Honjin Fukae, was installed on National Route 251.

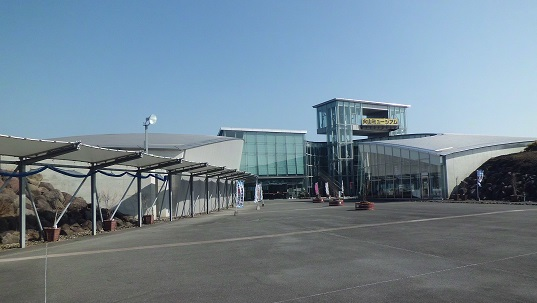
Mt. Unzen Disaster Memorial Hall

- On the coast, a landfill (Heisei-cho) was built with the earth and sand transported, and the Unzendake Disaster Memorial Hall, Shimabara Reconstruction Arena and Shimabara Workers General Welfare Center were built there.
- 10 million yen of support was provided to the residents with completely destroyed households. A new residential area – the "Nita housing complex" – was created on a hill for the victims.
- Various assistance was provided to prevent farmers from leaving the area. The Agricultural Improvement and Extension Center conducted interviews with all affected households (667 households) and held consultations for those who wished to resume agriculture until 1999. Training allowances were provided for those who planned to change the crops handled, and the reconstruction fund received a subsidy for the installation of a greenhouse or relocation costs. In parallel, the irrigation facilities in the affected areas were also developed. At the time of resuming agriculture in 2000, the number of farmers in the affected areas had decreased to 374. However, these support measures were successful, and the value of agricultural production in Shimabara City and Fukae Town recovered to almost the same level as before the disaster in 2005.
- On the bottom of the Ariake Sea off Shimabara city, mud containing volcanic ash had accumulated 20 to 80 centimetres (7.9 to 31.5 in) , and it has had difficulty recovering naturally.
- Heisei Shinzan has been surveyed and climbed several times (the general public is prohibited from climbing because of the alert area), and a detailed observation of the lava dome was carried out. Even now, active fumaroles can be observed from several places on the summit.
- The Shimabara Railway Line passed through the area affected by the eruptions, but was restored on some elevated reduction, including a disaster zone in 2008. Shimabaragaiko Station continued to operate, but Kazusa Station was abandoned.

Mount Unzen was designated a Decade Volcano by the United Nations, in 1991 as part of their International Decade for Natural Disaster Reduction, due to its history of violent activity and location in a densely populated area.
