= Arie (disambiguation) =

Arie is a masculine given name.

Arie or ARIE may also refer to:

- Arie, Nagasaki, Japan, a town that was merged with others to form the city of Minamishimabara
- Arie River, Nagasaki Prefecture, Japan
- Arie (film), a 2004 Russian film
- plural of aria
- Mark Arie (1882-1958), American sports shooter and double Olympic champion
- Raffaele Arié (1920-1988), Bulgarian operatic bass
- Annual Report on Indian Epigraphy

== See also ==
- India Arie (also known as India.Arie), American singer, songwriter, musician and record producer born India Arie Simpson in 1975
- Jacob Ben-Arie, Israeli paralympic athlete of the 1960s and 1970s
- Shavit Ben-Arie (born 1985), Israeli activist
