= Shimabara Peninsula =

Peninsula of Kyushu in Nagasaki Prefecture, Japan

- Peninsula
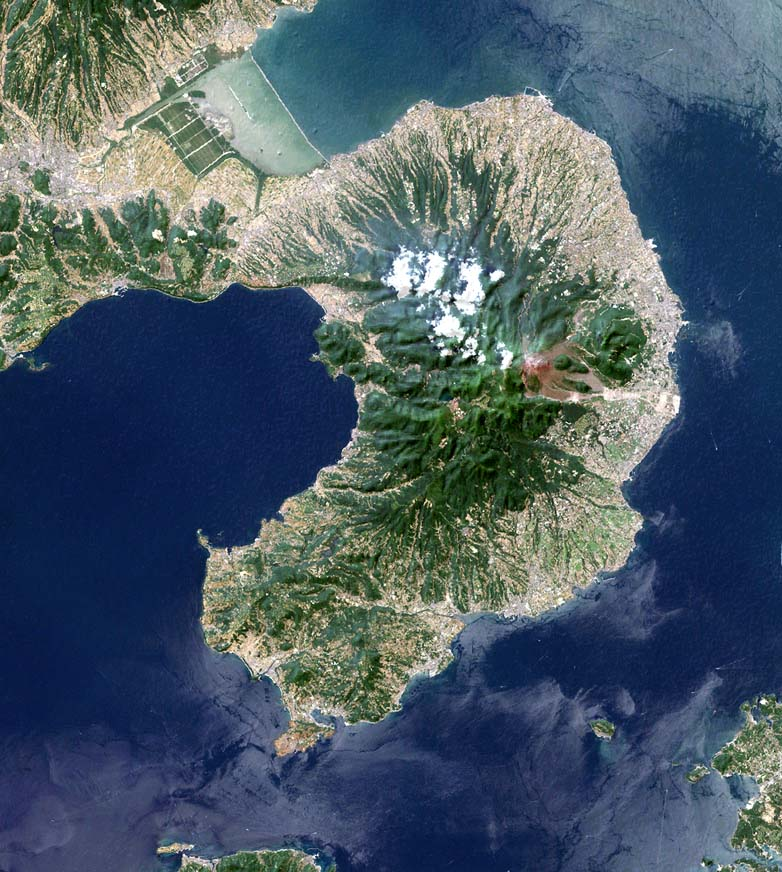
- Landsat image of Shimabara Peninsula
- Interactive map of Shimabara Peninsula
- Coordinates: 32°45′N 130°16′E
- Location: Kyushu, Nagasaki Prefecture, Japan

The Shimabara Peninsula (島原半島, Shimabara-hantō) is a peninsula located in Nagasaki Prefecture on the island of Kyushu, Japan. The peninsula incorporates the cities of Shimabara, Minamishimabara, and Unzen.

The northern, eastern, and southeastern coasts of the peninsula face the Ariake Sea, and the western coast faces Tachibana Bay. An active group of volcanoes known collectively as Mount Unzen lies in the middle of the peninsula, with many hot springs, such as Unzen Onsen and the extremely hot Obama Onsen.

The peninsula was also the site of the Shimabara Rebellion, a 1637–1638 peasant and rōnin revolt led by Christians. This further reinforced distrust of Christians and foreigners by Shōgun Iemitsu and contributed to the 1639 decision to isolate Japan from the outside world. From then on, the Dutch and the Chinese were the only ones permitted to enter Japan through Nagasaki in a very limited fashion until Japan was reopened again.

== Administrative region ==
- Eastern section of Isahaya
- Shimabara
- Minamishimabara
- Unzen

location

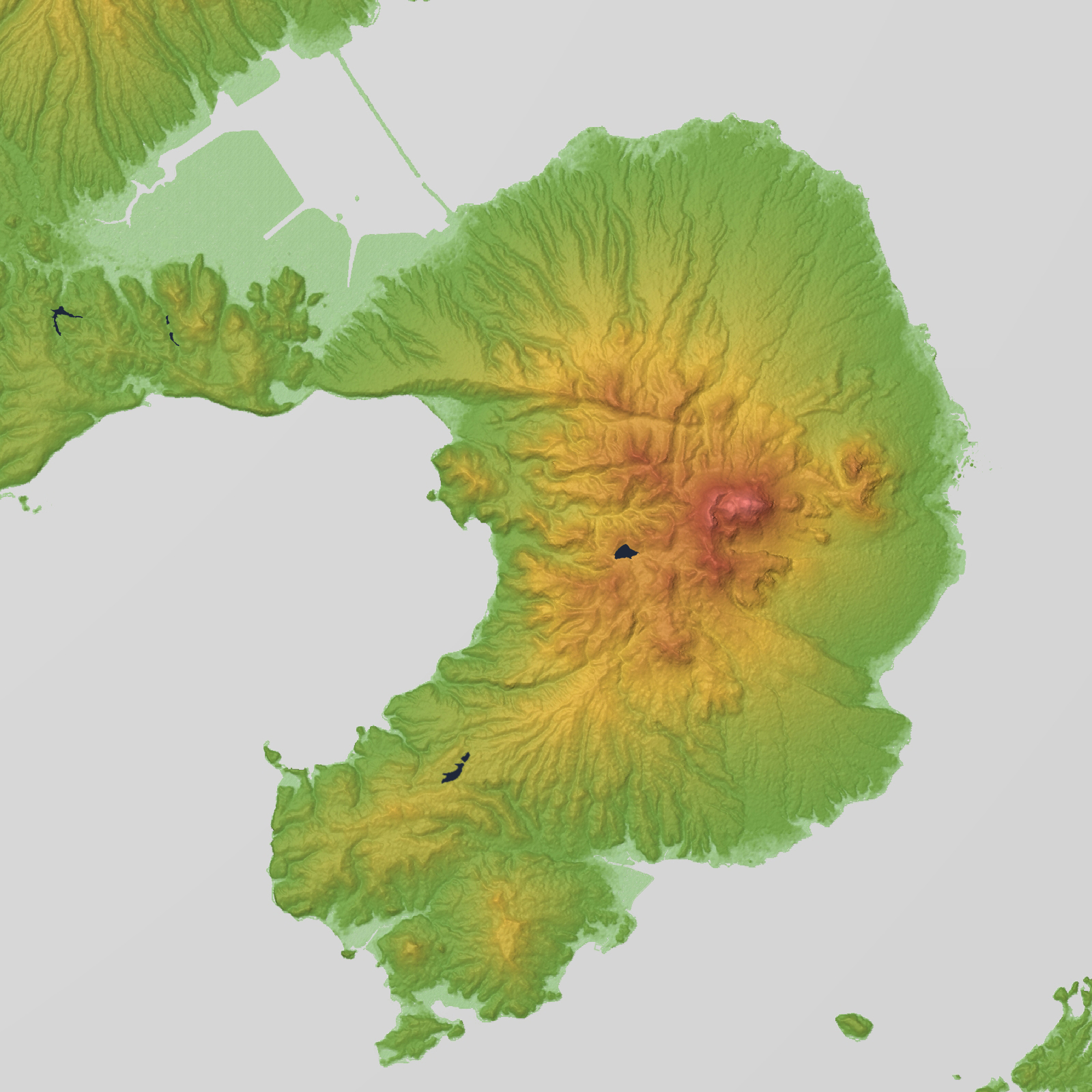
Relief Map
