= Kashima Gatalympics =

Annual sporting event in Japan

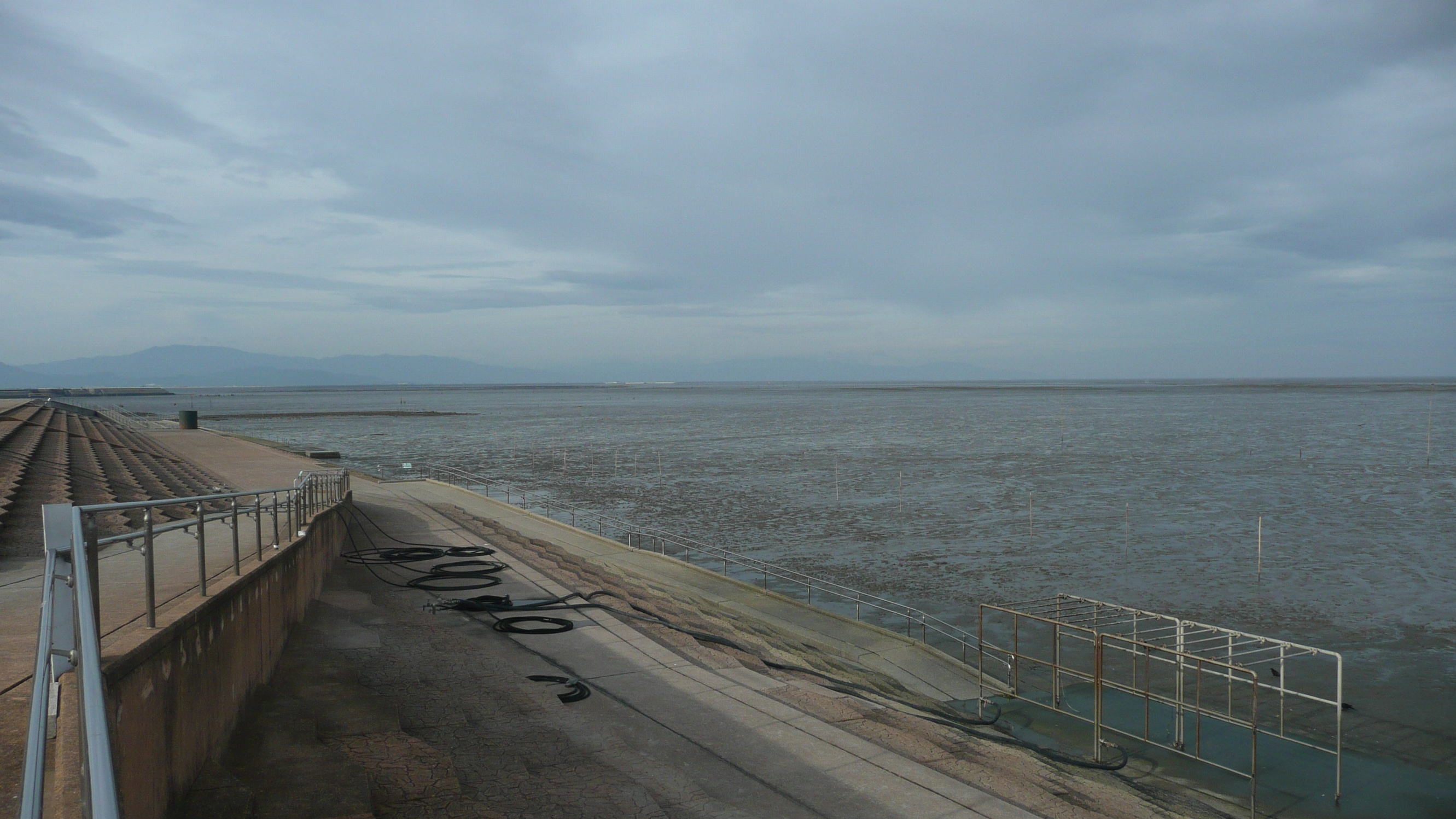
The Ariake Sea coastline and mudflats at Kashima, Saga, where the Gatalympics are held each year

The Kashima Gatalympics is an event held on the mudflats of the Ariake Sea at Kashima in Saga Prefecture, Japan. The event takes place every year at the end of May. Participants compete in novelty games such as the mud sumo tournament, the 25m dash and the surf board race. The Ariake Sea has a tidal range of six metres, which at low tide exposes the mudflats on which the games take place. It has become a well known event throughout Saga Prefecture with around 300 athletes participating each year.

== History ==
When the prefecture plan for Saga was published in 1984, it was decided that Kashima City would not have a highway or a Shinkansen connection. Mr. Masahiko Kuwahara, the mayor of Kashima, was also the president of the junior chamber. He created a committee called "Forum Kashima" to improve the city's cultural calendar. As a result, the 1st Kashima Gatalympic event was held on 3 May 1985.

As the Gatalympics became well known, the mudflats that had been previously neglected were improved. As a result, the mudflats became an important and valued symbol for the growth of the city as a whole.

When deciding on a name, initially "The big athletic meet on the mudlats" was proposed. Later, a second name "The Gata-olympic big athletic meet on the mudflats" was suggested. This was eventually being shortened to just the "Gatalympics". The term "Gatalympics" comes from the name of the mudflats in Japanese, Kashima Higata (鹿島干潟), and the Olympics.

== Events ==
- The 2007 Event was on 27 May. The opening ceremony commenced at 10am, with events from 11am to 3pm.
- The 2009 Gatalympics were held on 7 June.
- The 30th Kashima Gatalympics took place on 25 May 2014.

== In popular culture ==
- The Gatalympics was featured in the anime Zombie Land Saga, bringing wide popularity to the event.
