= Isahaya Bay =

- 諫早湾 (Japanese)
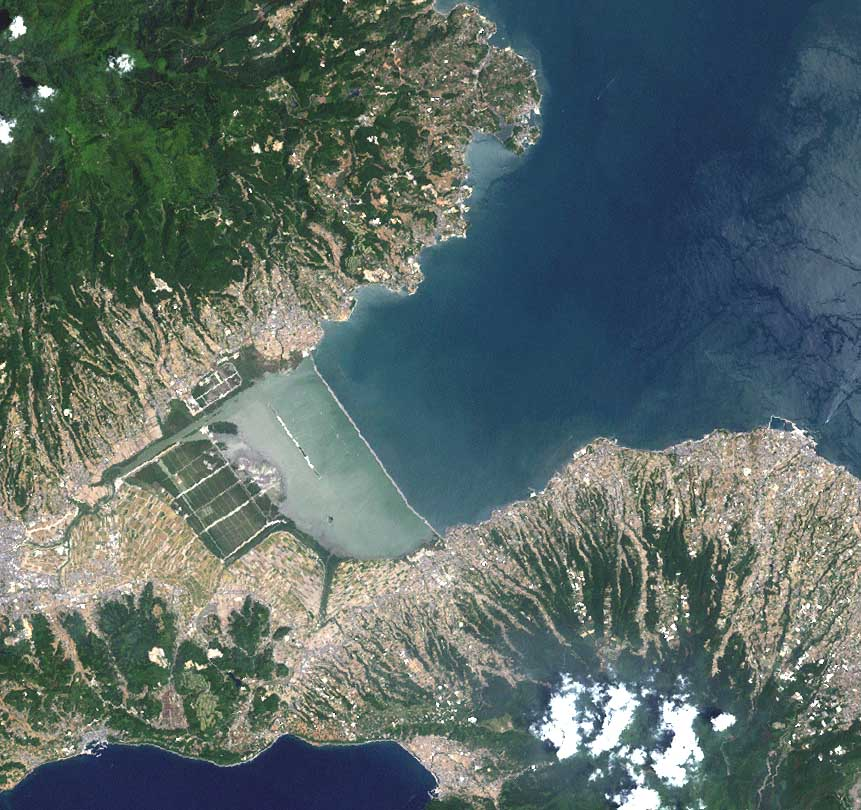
- Satellite image of Isahaya Bay in 2001

- Location within Japan
- Location: Nagasaki Prefecture, Japan
- Coordinates: 32°54′11.5″N 130°12′51.72″E
- Type: Bay
- Part of: Ariake Sea; East China Sea
- Basin countries: Japan
- Surface area: 65 km^{2} (25 mi^{2})
- Average depth: 10 m (33 ft)
- Max. depth: 10 m (33 ft)
- Settlements: Isahaya; Shimabara

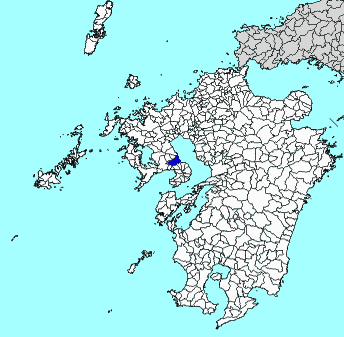
Location map (Highlighted in blue)

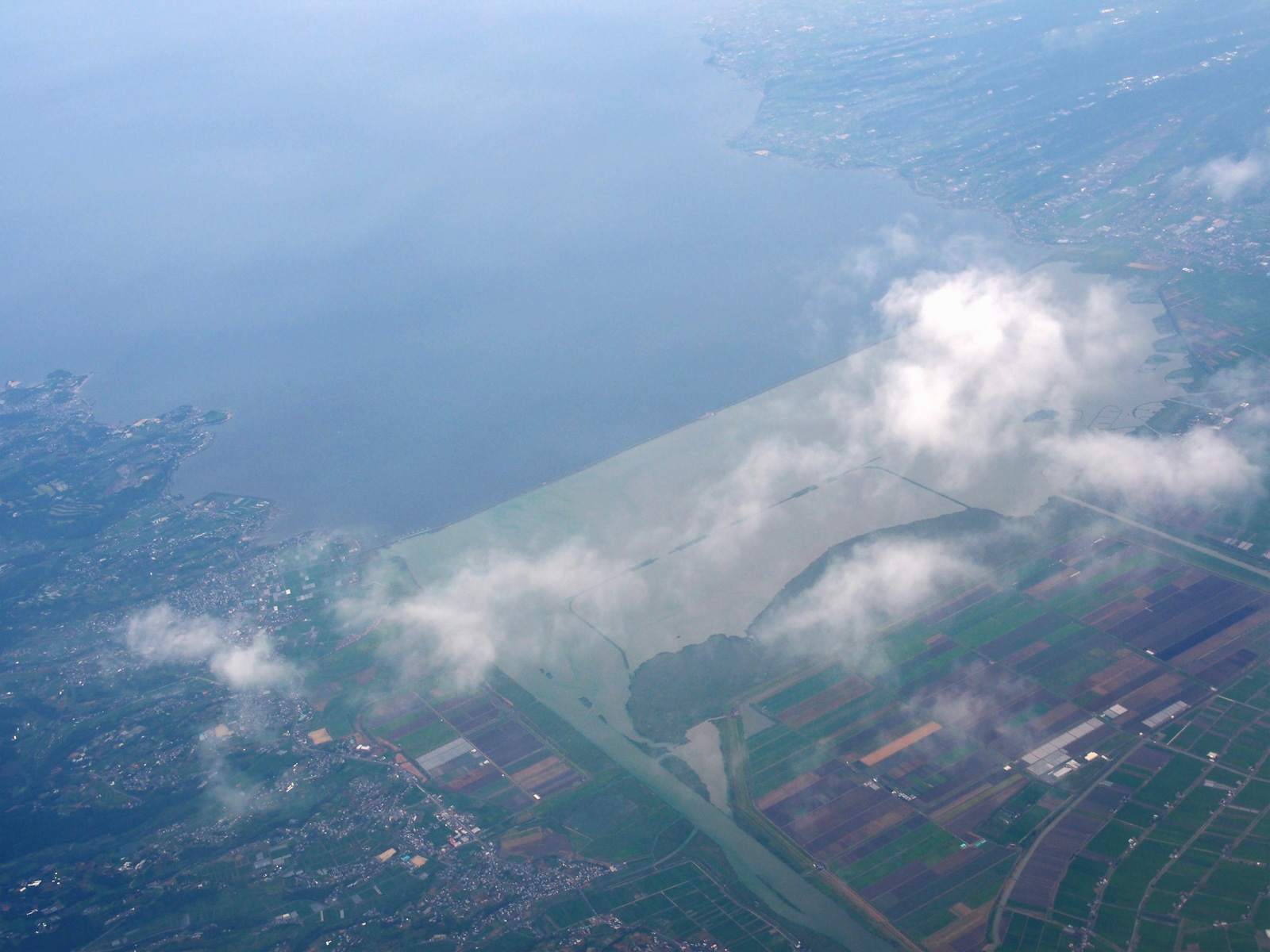
Isahaya Bay in 2012 with the section of the bay closed off.

Isahaya Bay (諫早湾, Isahaya-wan) is a bay within the Ariake Sea, located northwest of the Shimabara Peninsula in Nagasaki Prefecture, Japan. Its surface area is about 65 square kilometres (25 mi^{2}), with a maximum depth of 10 metres (33 ft).

In 1986, the governor of Isahaya began an 235 billion-yen reclamation project of a tidal flat by closing off part of the bay for agricultural purposes with it being completed in 2008. However, the reclamation project was met with a series of protests from local fishermen, who said that the closing of the bay had caused changes in currents along with mass pollution within the bay, which had affected their catches.

== Geography ==
Isahaya Bay is located within the Ariake Sea on the island of Kyushu, Japan. It covers an area of 65 square kilometres (25 mi^{2}) and has a mean depth of 10 metres (33 ft).

== Legacy ==
Reportedly, the reclamation project and the conflict with local citizens was the inspiration behind the antagonists Team Magma and Team Aqua in the Pokémon franchise.
