= Obama Onsen =

Hot spring system in Nagasaki Prefecture, Japan

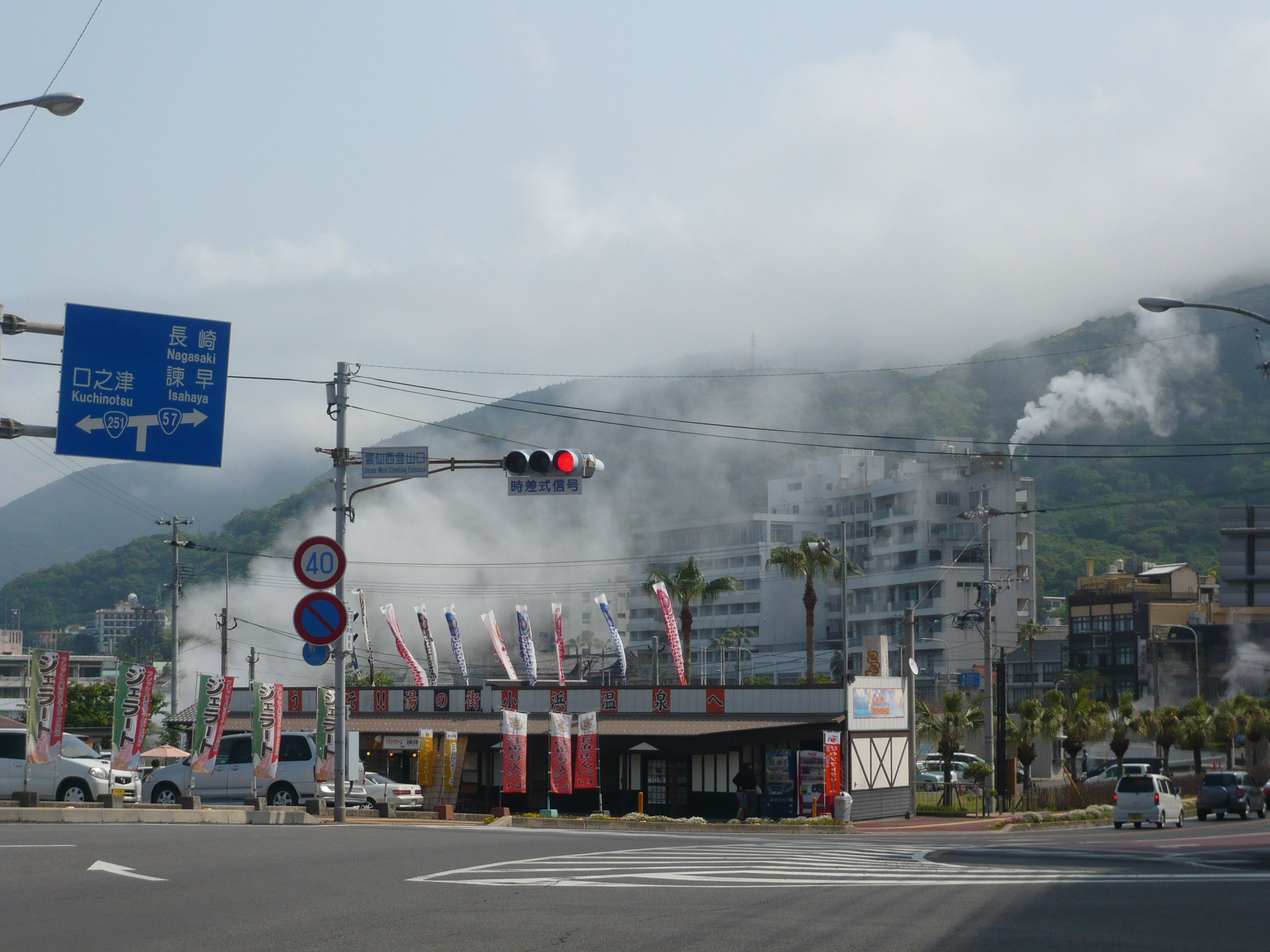
- Interactive map of Obama Onsen
- Location: Kyushu island, Nagasaki Prefecture
- Coordinates: 32°43′41.6″N 130°12′25.7″E
- Type: geothermal
- Temperature: 80–105 °C (176–221 °F)

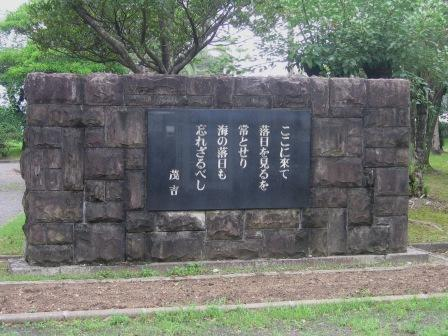
Monument showing the poem by Saito Mokichi.

Obama Onsen (小浜温泉) is an onsen (hot spring resort) in Obama, Unzen, Nagasaki Prefecture, Japan. The hot springs system is located in the foothills of Mount Unzen Volcano.

In Japanese, the word, "obama" means "little beach" or "little island". Although at least since 2008, the town's tourism office had been greeting visitors with a life-sized statue of the former American president, Barack Obama, and vendors in town sold Barack Obama-themed towels. Both the statue and themed towel has been removed.

== Water profile ==
The hot spring system known for having the hottest and most active springs in Japan, with some of them reaching 80-105 °C and producing over 15,000 tons of hot water daily. The hot spring system consists of 30 individual springs.

== Environs ==
Its location near the seashore allows one to see the sun setting, which makes it a popular place to visit in the evenings. The poet Saito Mokichi wrote about Obama Onsen in his poem Sunset Plaza (夕日の広場, Yūhi no Hiroba), and a monument with the words of the poem was erected near the onsen. The area was formerly part of Hizen Province.

The onsen was designated as a National Recreation Onsen in 1962, and was first recorded in a topographic record (肥前風土記, Hizen Fudoki) in 713 AD.

A fireworks show is held annually in December.

== Cuisine ==
Obama Onsen is famous for its Obama chanpon, a dish made of noodles, seafood, and vegetables. The onsen has about 20 stores and restaurants nearby, serving everything from Western style food to sushi, alcoholic beverages, and interpretations of the Obama Chanpon. Shrimp are found in abundance along the beaches near the onsen, and a special soup is made from them.

Additionally, Obama Onsen is famous for its Yu Senpei, a thin round crackers made using flour, eggs, sugar and hot spring water. Due to the high sulfur concentration in the hot spring water in Unzen area other than Obama, The Yu Senpei became a local specialty. It was sold as a specialty around 1884, and is characterized by its subtle sweetness, light, and gentle flavor.

== Access ==
The onsen is accessible by bus from Isahaya Station on the Nagasaki Main Line and Ōmura Lines run by JR Kyushu, as well as the Shimabara Railway Line. The ride is about 60 minutes.
