= 1792 Unzen landslide and tsunami =

Natural disaster in Japan

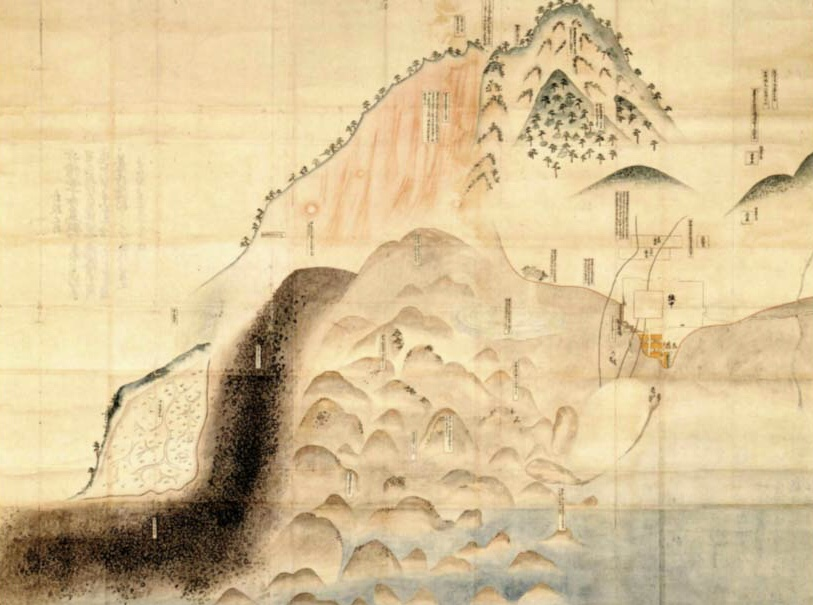

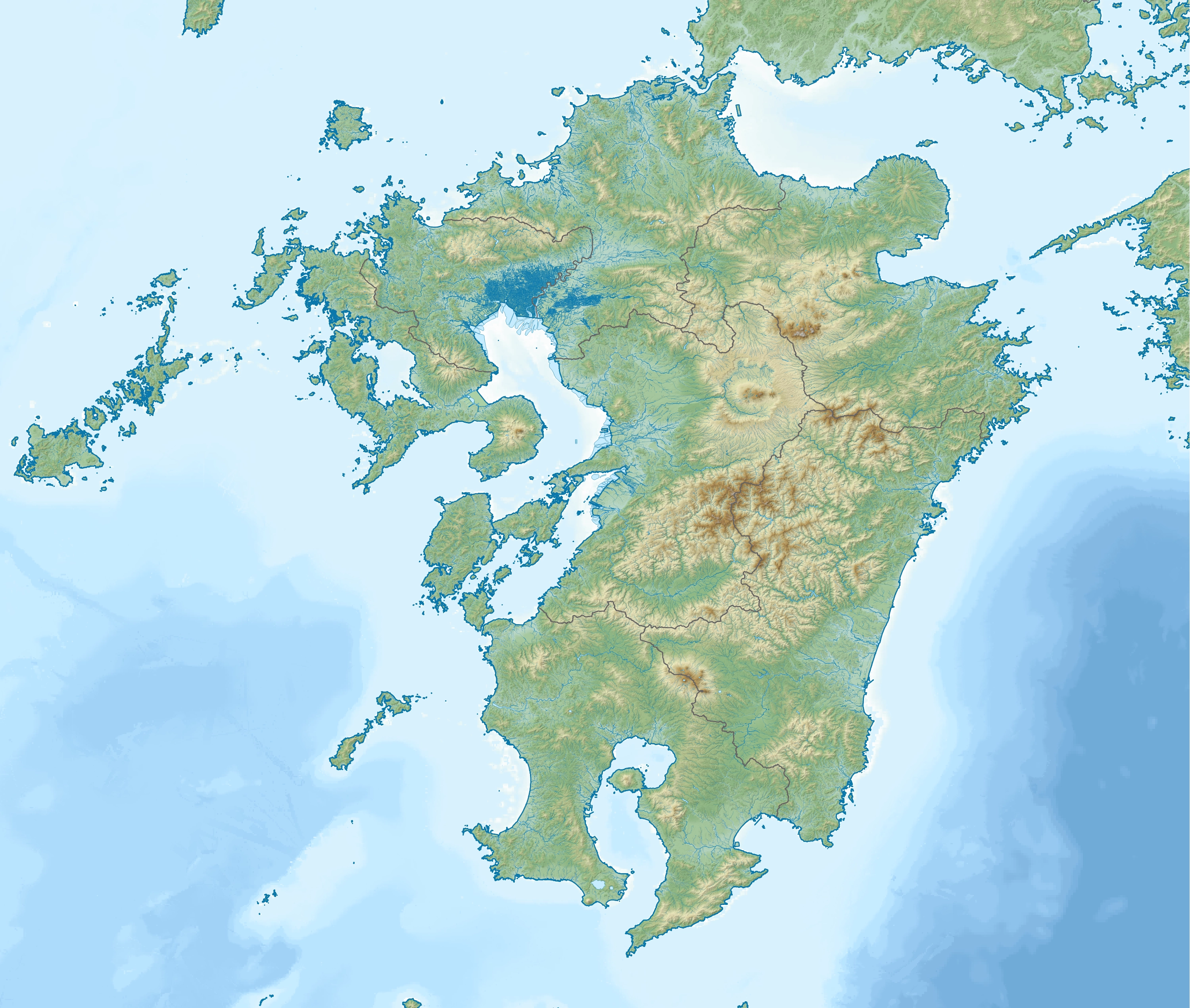
- Location within Kyushu Location within Japan
- Local date: May 21, 1792
- Magnitude: 6.4 M_{s}
- Epicenter: 32.8°N 130.3°E
- Areas affected: Japan: Kyushu, Shimabara, Nagasaki
- Tsunami: Yes
- Casualties: 15,000 deaths from landslide and megatsunami (estimate)

The 1792 Unzen landslide and tsunami was a volcanic megadisaster, occurring on 21 May 1792, during the Edo period. Triggered by the volcanic activity of Mount Unzen (on the Shimabara Peninsula, Nagasaki Prefecture, Kyushu, Japan), it caused a massive collapse of the Mayuyama lava dome and a subsequent tsunami. Approximately 15,000 people lost their lives, making it the largest scale volcanic disaster in Japanese history. It was also called Shimabara suffered, Higo affected (島原大変肥後迷惑), since many people were killed by this tsunami in Higo (Kumamoto Prefecture, situated 20 km (12.4 mi) across the Ariake Sea).

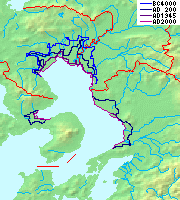
Change of coastline of Ariake Sea, Mount Unzen in the center, Kumamoto Prefecture (right) and Amakusa islands (down) were affected by tsunami

== Volcanic activities ==
Towards the end of 1791, a series of earthquakes occurred on the western flank of Mount Unzen which gradually moved towards Fugen-dake (one of Mount Unzen's peaks). In February 1792, Fugen-dake started to erupt, triggering a lava flow which continued for two months. Meanwhile, the earthquakes continued, shifting nearer to the city of Shimabara. On the night of 21 May, two large earthquakes were followed by a collapse of the eastern flank of Mount Unzen's Mayuyama dome, causing a landslide which swept through the city of Shimabara and into the Ariake Sea, triggering a great tsunami.

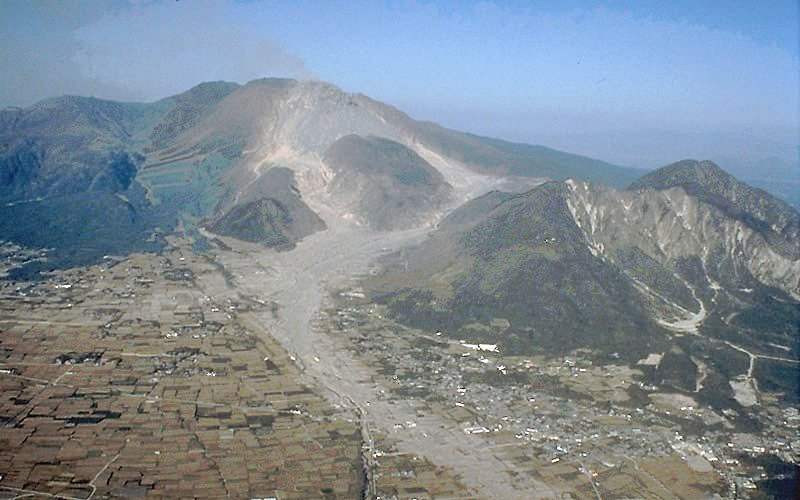
Mount Unzen (center) and Mayuyama (right) showing the destruction, recent photo

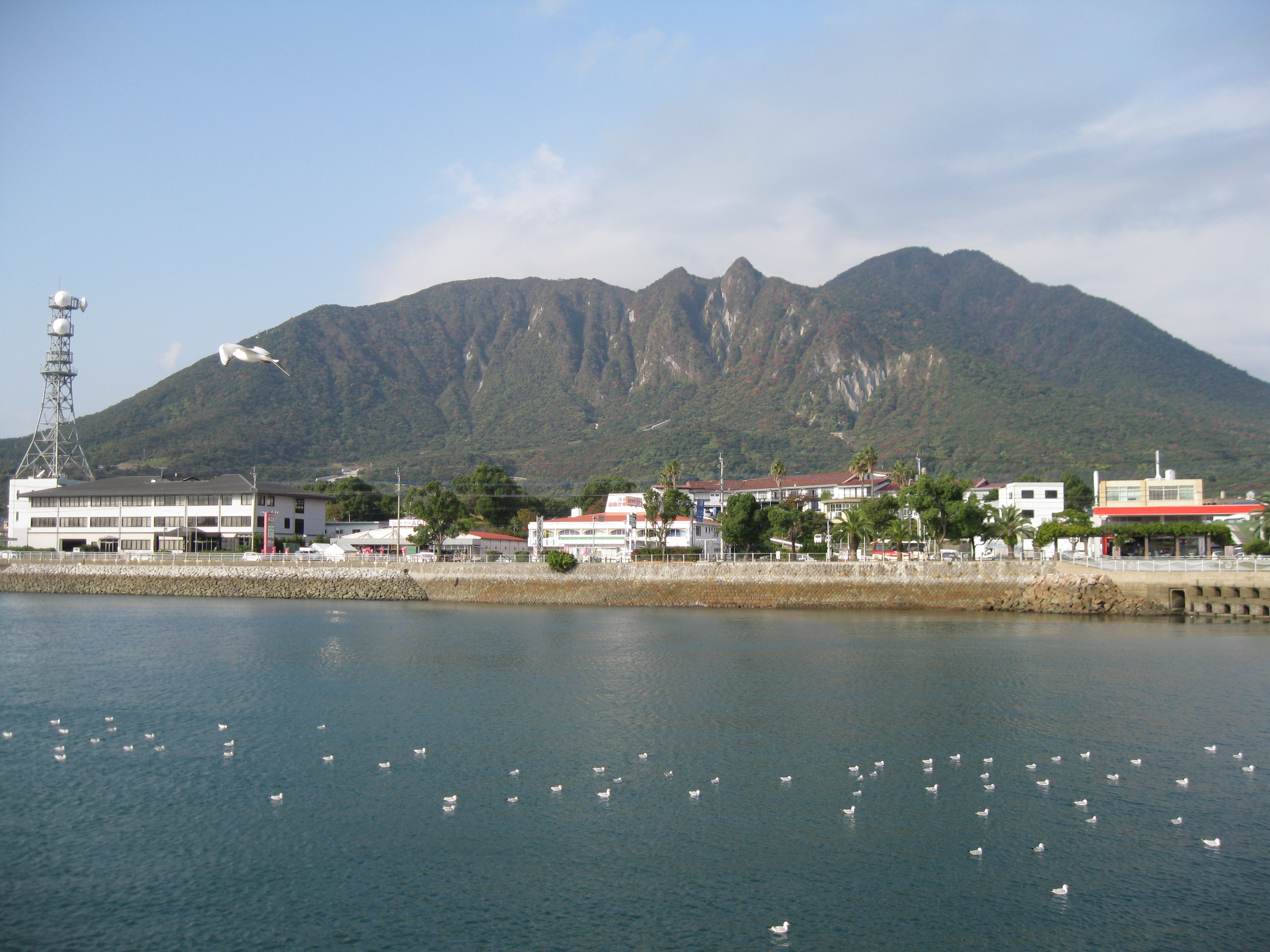
Mayuyama of Shimabara Peninsula, from the sea of Shimabara City

== Megatsunami ==
It is not known whether the collapse occurred as a result of an eruption of the dome or as a result of the earthquakes. The tsunami struck Higo Province on the other side of Ariake Bay before bouncing back and hitting Shimabara again. Out of an estimated total of 15,000 fatalities, around 5,000 are thought to have been killed by the landslide, around 5,000 by the tsunami across the bay in Higo Province, and a further 5,000 by the tsunami returning to strike Shimabara. The initial wave once reached a height of 330 ft (100 m), classing this tsunami as a megatsunami. At the Osaki-bana point Futsu town, the waves locally grew to a height of 187 ft (57 m) due to the effect of sea bottom topography.

== Monuments ==
As of July 1991, the following monuments have been found:

Monuments related to the earthquake and tsunami
| Kind of monument | Kumamoto Prefecture | Nagasaki Prefecture | Total |
|---|---|---|---|
| Memorial monument | 43 | 41 | 84 |
| Tsunami border monument | 5 | 0 | 5 |
| Graves | 16 | 90 | 106 |
| Simple monument | 1 | 0 | 1 |
| Others | 9 | 3 | 12 |
| Total | 74 | 134 | 208 |

== Lake Shirachi ==
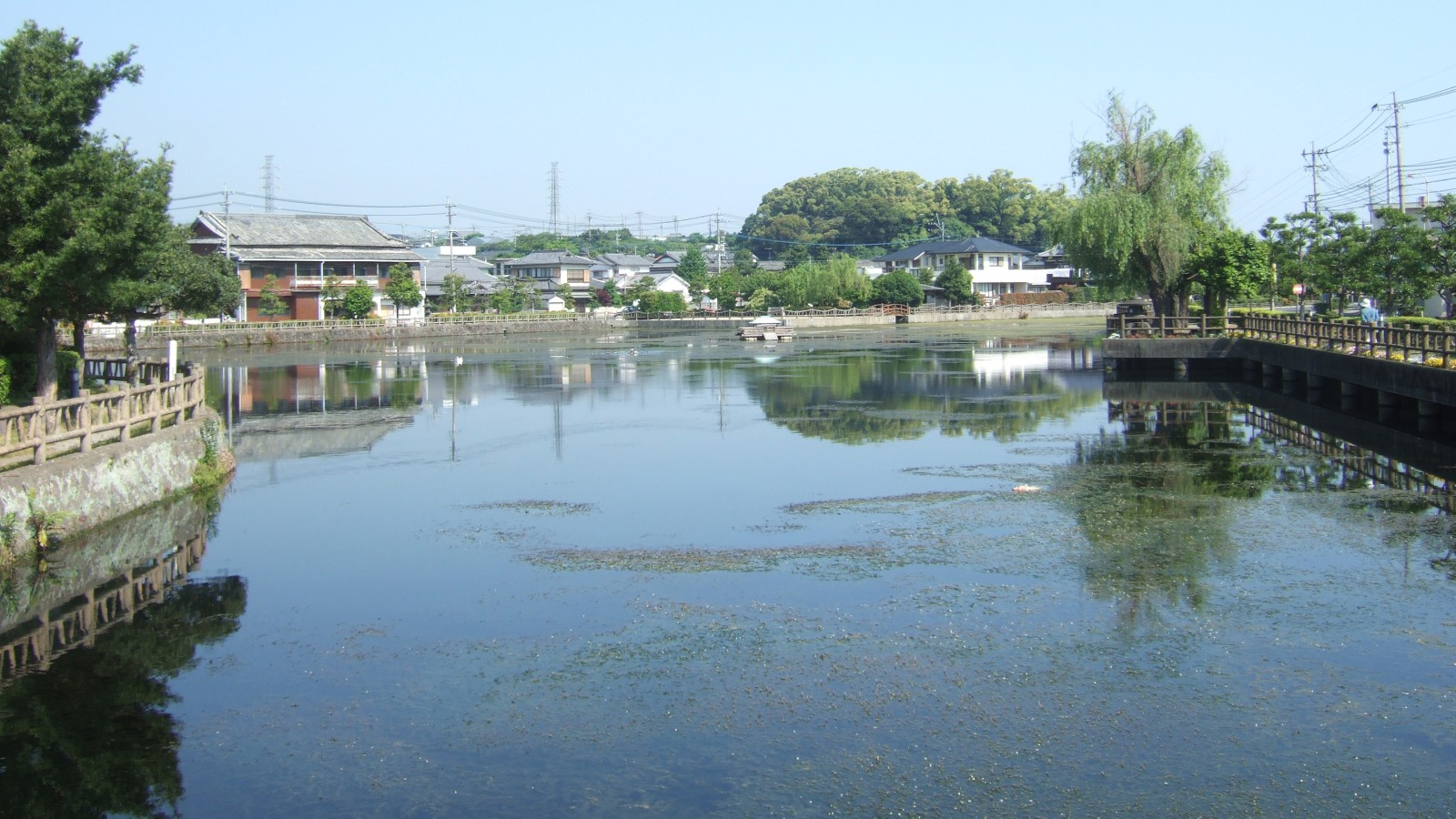
Lake Shirachi

Lake Shirachi is a pond in Shimabara city, Nagasaki Prefecture which was created after the landslide at Mayuyama created by the inpouring of underground water. Its size was first 1 km (south-north) and 300m 400m (east to west), but the production of a water exit river made it smaller and it is now 200 m by 70 m.

== Tsukumojima (99 islets) ==
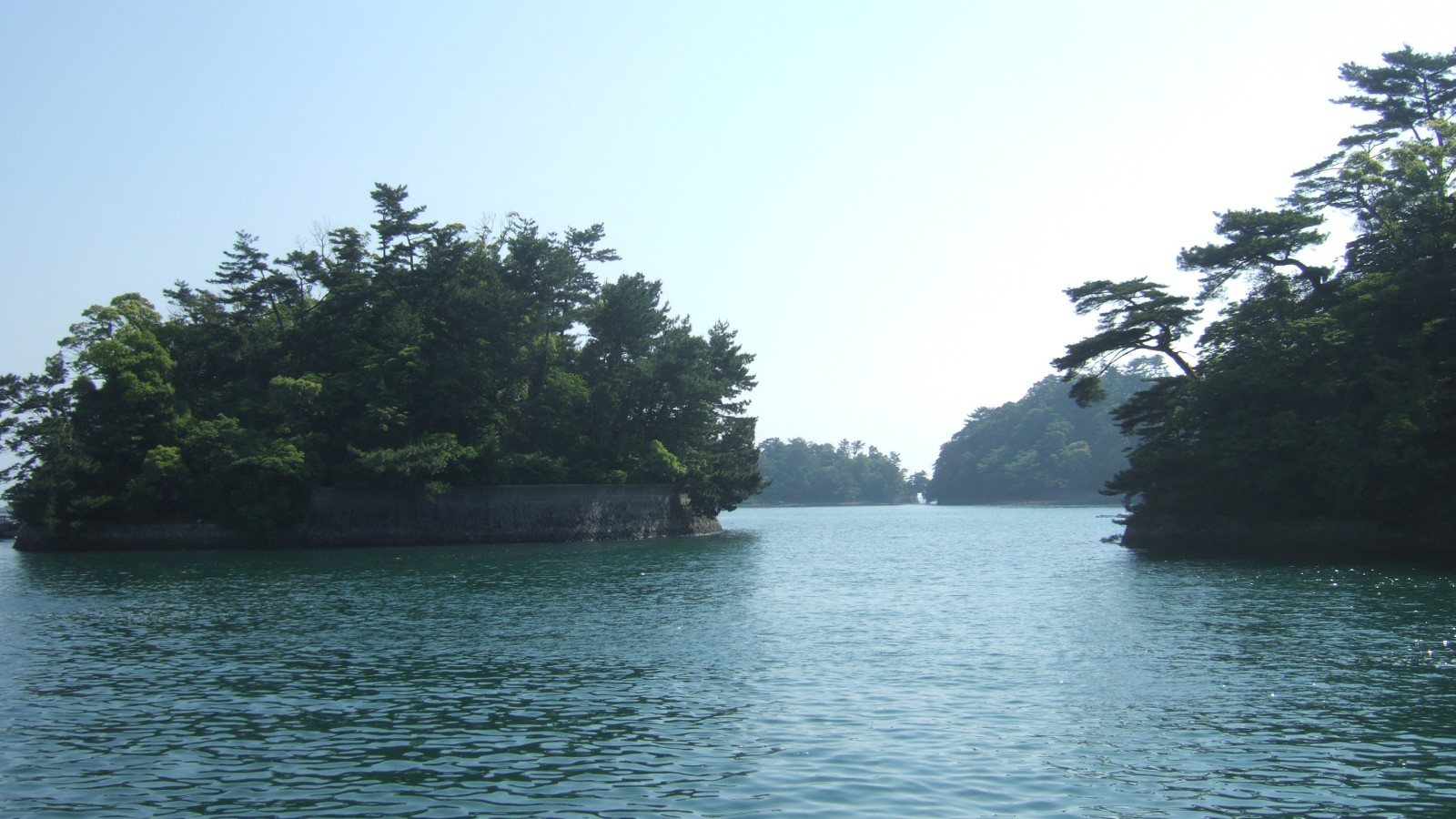
Tsukumojima

As a result of the destruction, Tsukumojima or 99 islets or rocks were distributed near Shimabara city. In the same Nagasaki Prefecture, there are 99 islands or Kujūkushima distributed from Sasebo city to Hirado city. These islands are different from Tsukumojima.

== See also ==
- 1741 eruption of Oshima–Ōshima and the Kampo tsunami
- 1771 Great Yaeyama Tsunami
- 1888 Ritter Island eruption and tsunami
- List of earthquakes in Japan
- List of historical earthquakes
