= Unzen Onsen =

Thermal springs

- Unzen Hot Springs
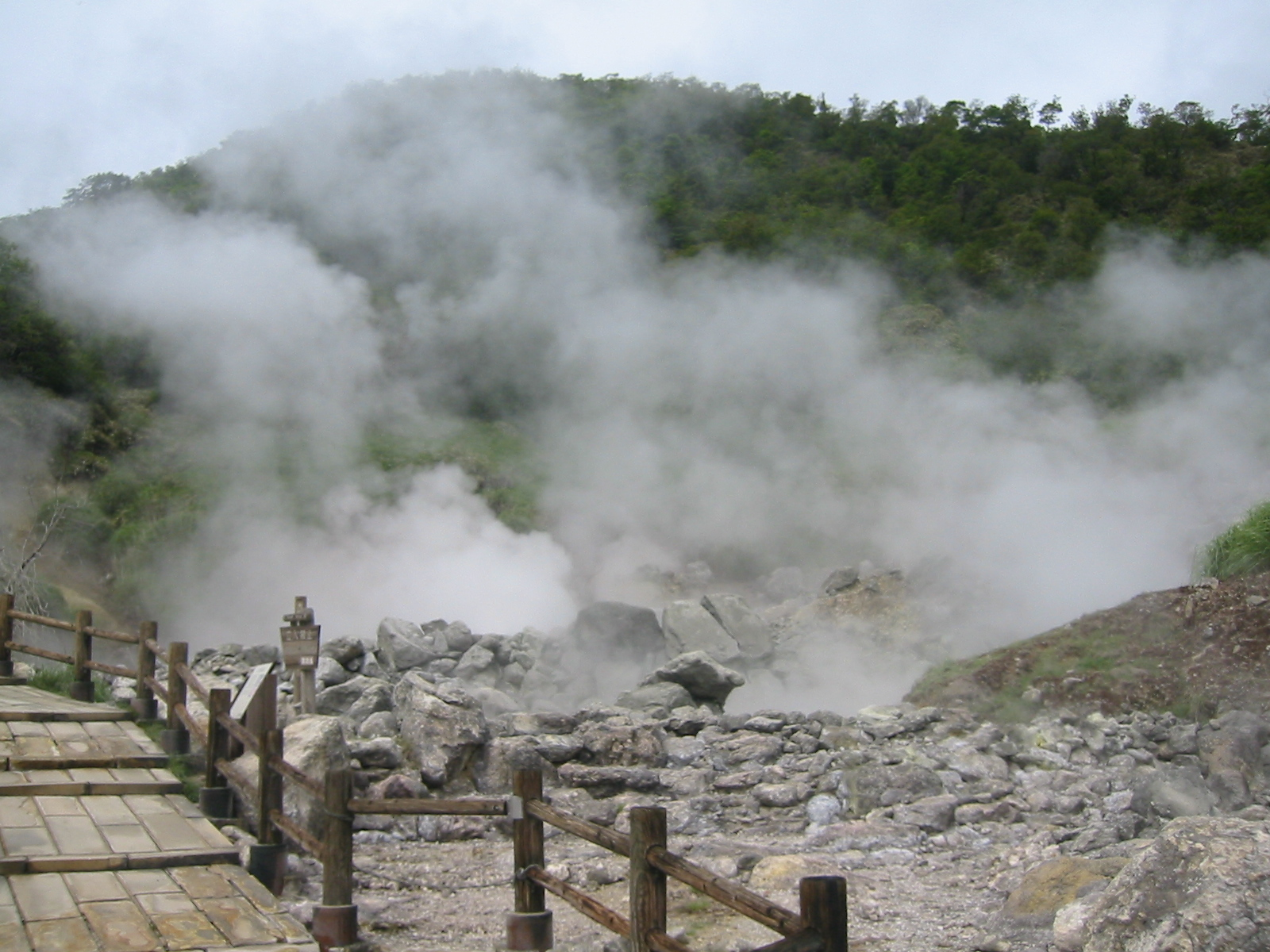
- Interactive map of Unzen Onsen
- Coordinates: 32°44′25″N 130°15′44″E
- Elevation: 680 metres (2,230 ft)
- Type: geothermal, volcanic
- Temperature: 98 °C (208 °F)

Unzen Onsen is a geothermally heated volcanic hot spring field in the Unzen Mountains in Nagasaki prefecture in Japan. It was known of for many years, and in the 1910s was developed into a hot spring community because of its many springs. In 1934 the area was designated as the first national park in Japan.

The hot springs are surrounded by an area known as the Hells (jigoku). These barren fields of hot springs contain many steam vents, bubbling mud pits and fumaroles. After the Shimabara Rebellion the Hells were used to execute Christian rebels. Today, paved trails lead visitors through the Hells.

In an older, now dormant hot springs field, paths lead to the Manmyoji Temple and to the Unzen Disaster Museum, that commemorates the eruptions that occurred in the 1990s in which 12,000 people were evacuated and over 40 people perished.

== Gallery ==
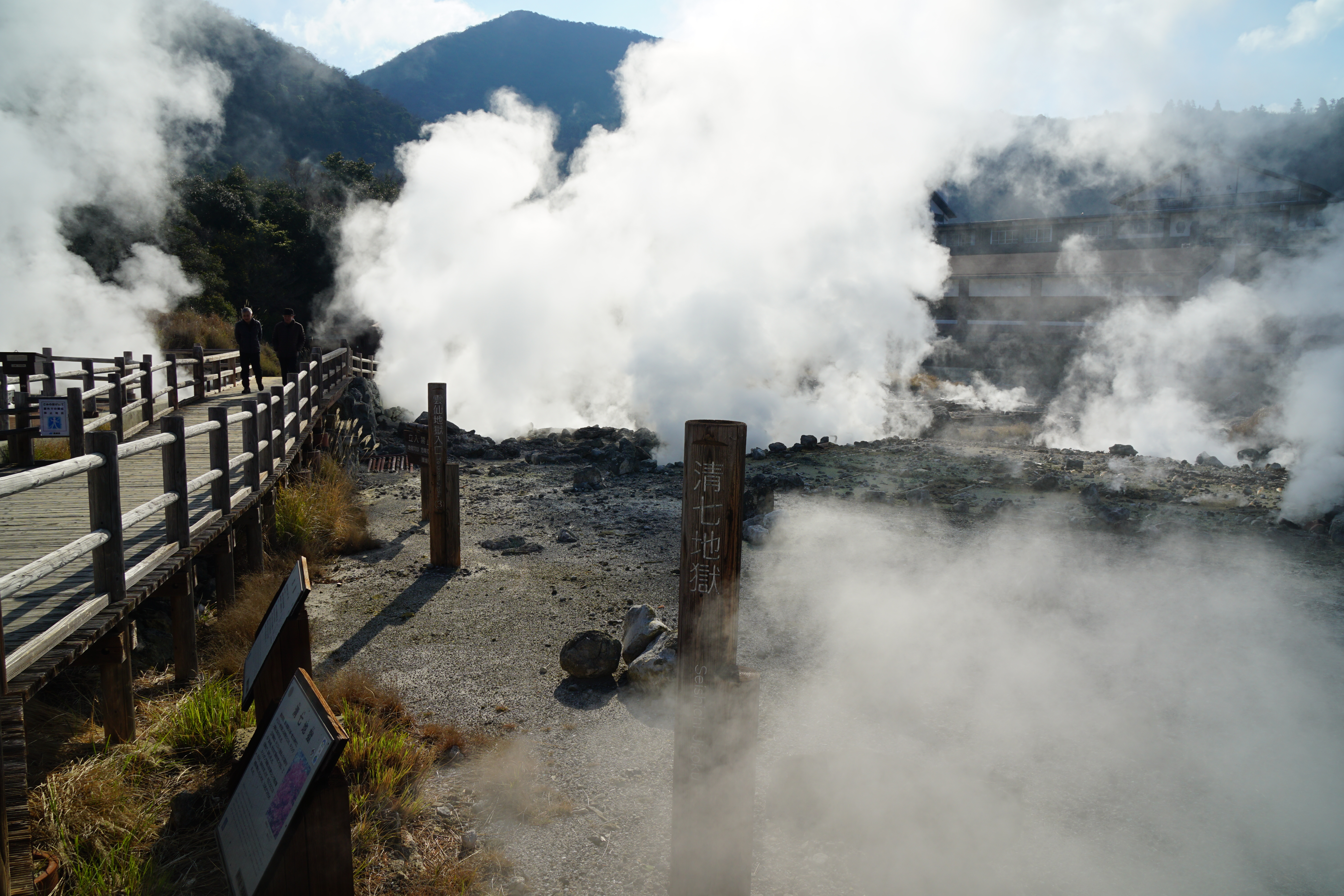
Unzen Onsen Hells

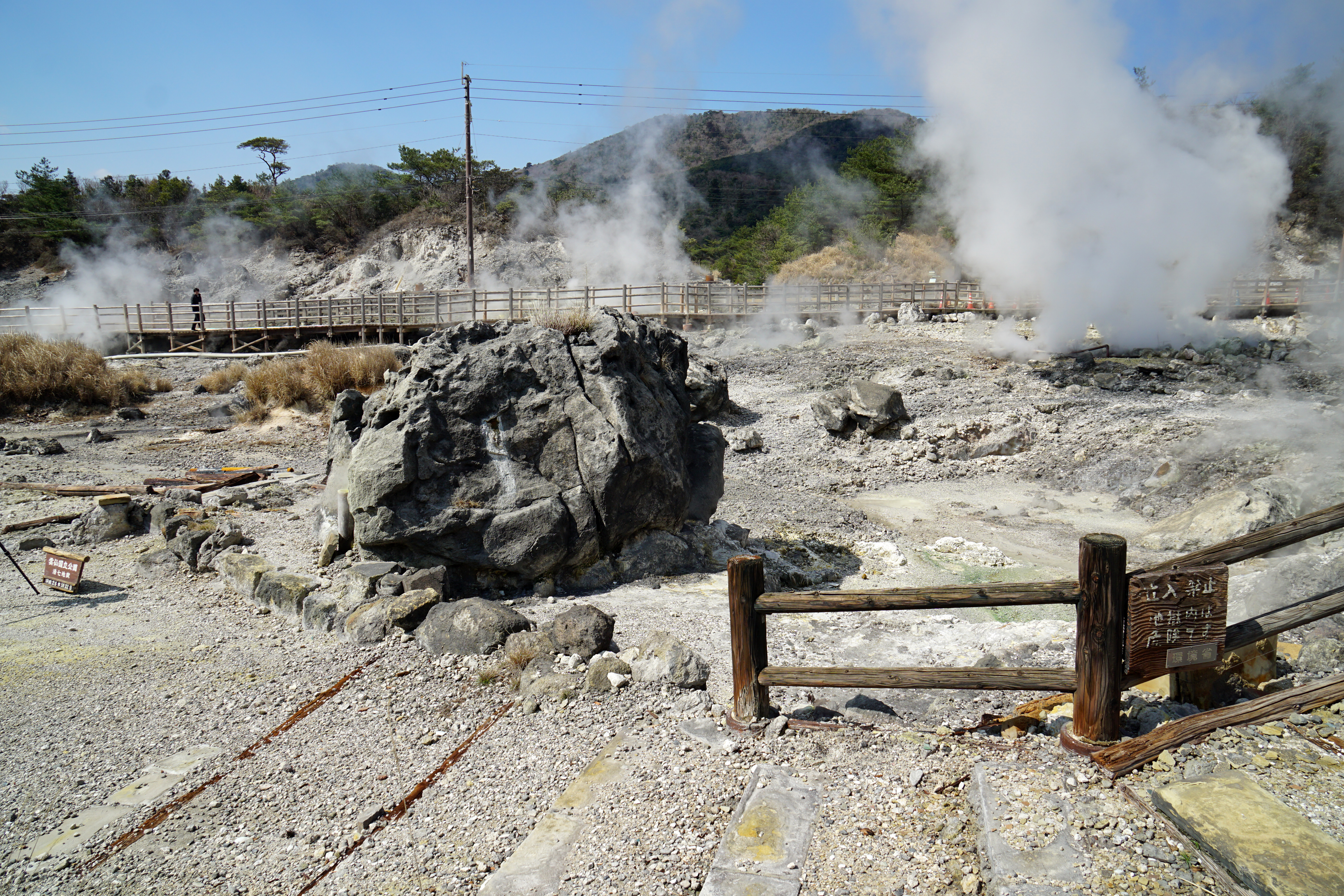
Unzen Onsen Hells

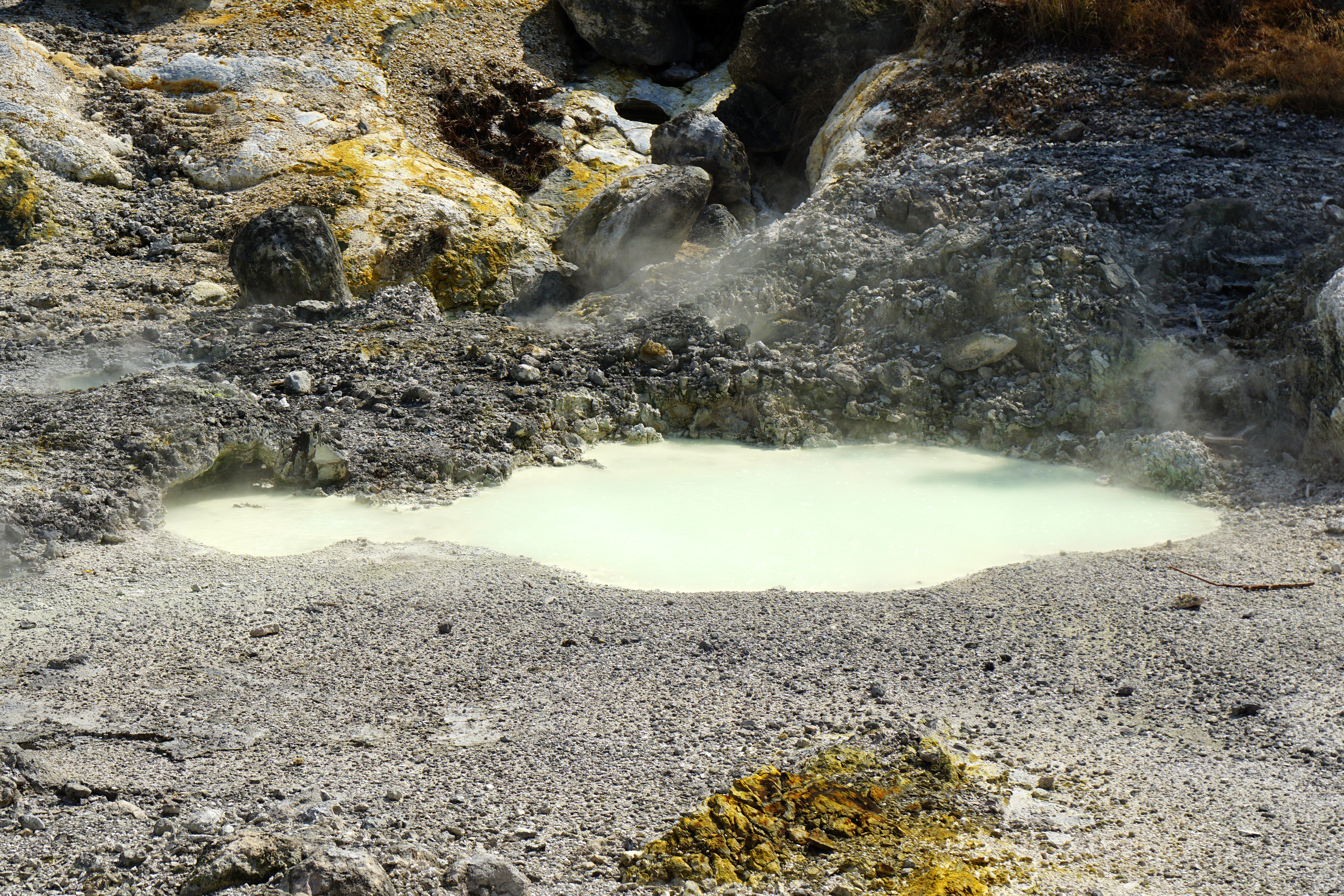
sulphurous hot spring

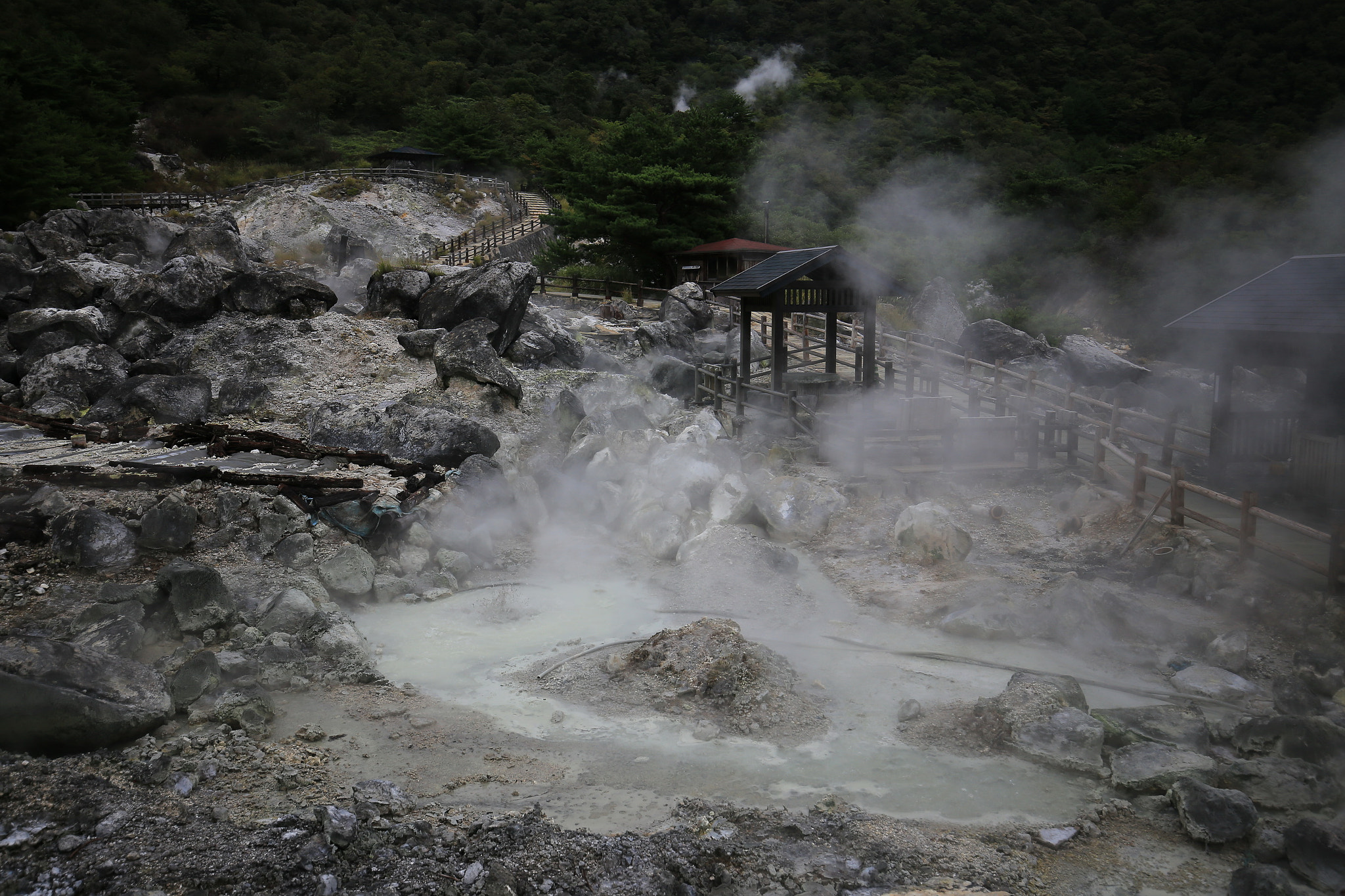
bubbling mud pits (mud volcanoes)

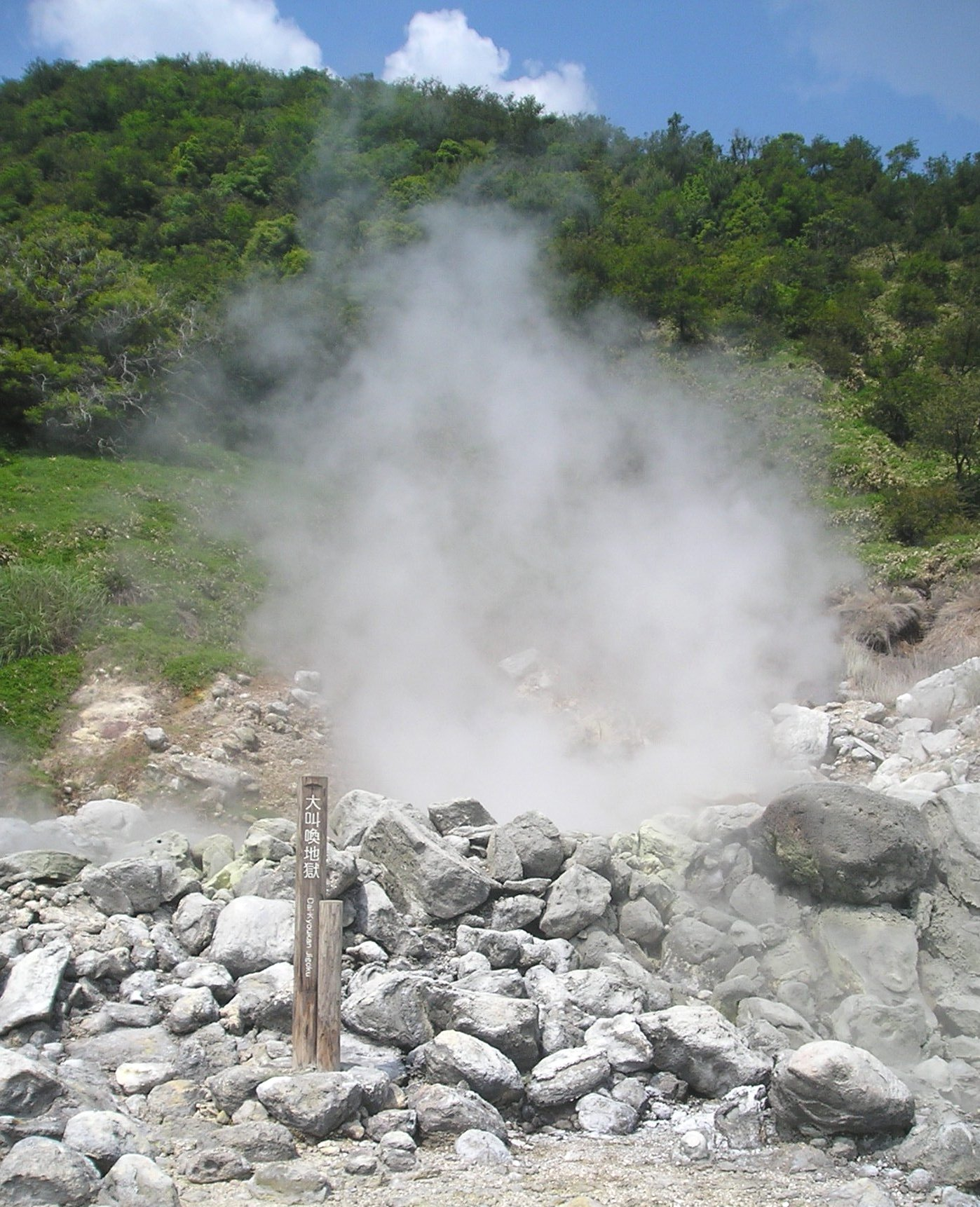
steam vent

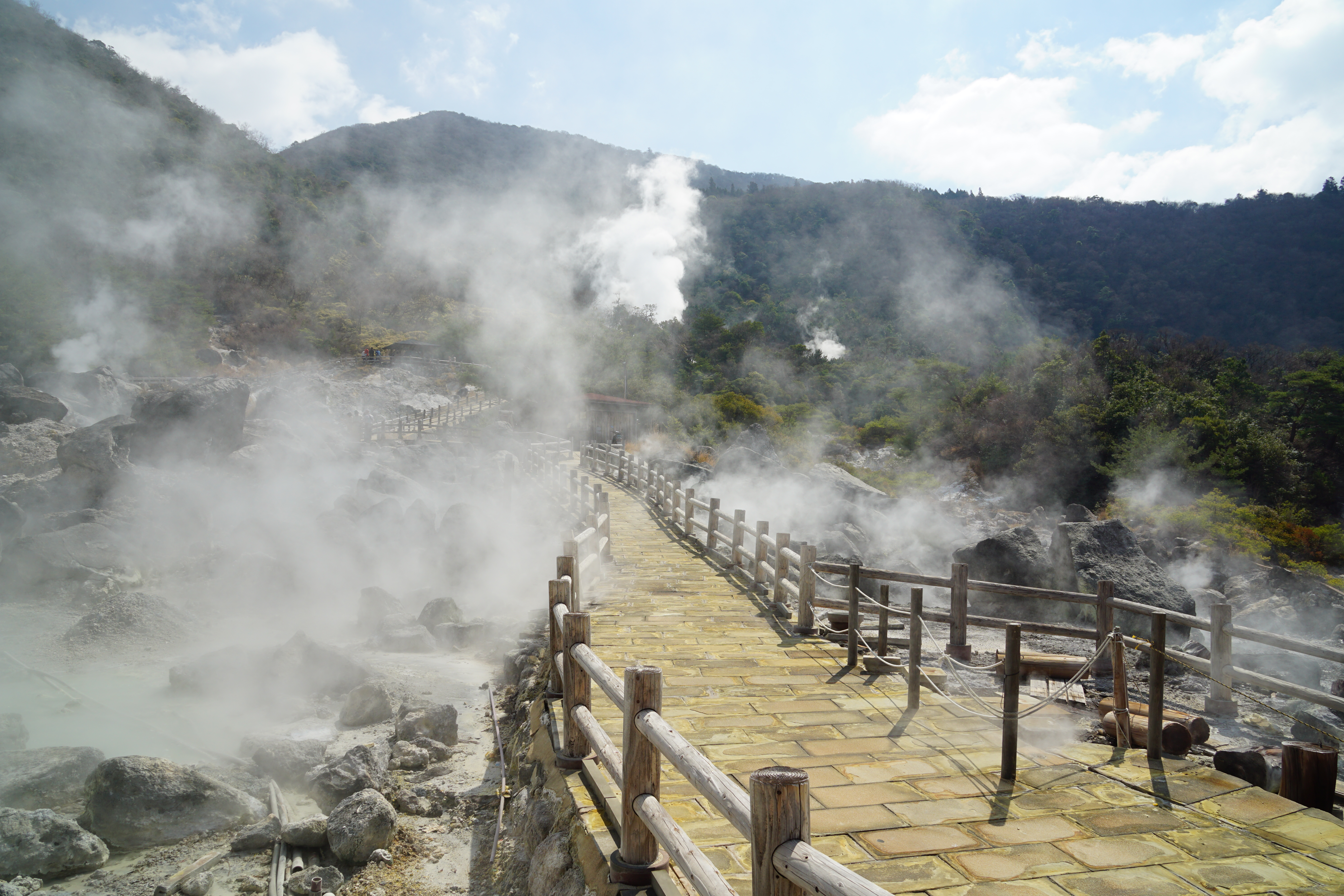
Unzen Onsen Hells

== Water profile ==
The hot mineral water has a high sulfur content, and strong levels of acidity. In addition to sulfur, the mineral content includes aluminum, iron, and sulfate. The water temperature is 98 °C, and the hot carbonate and hydrogen sulfide gasses that erupt from the springs can be as high as 120 °C.

== See also ==
- Mount Unzen
- List of hot springs in Japan
- List of hot springs in the world
