= Mount Unzen =

Group of volcanoes in Nagasaki Prefecture, Japan

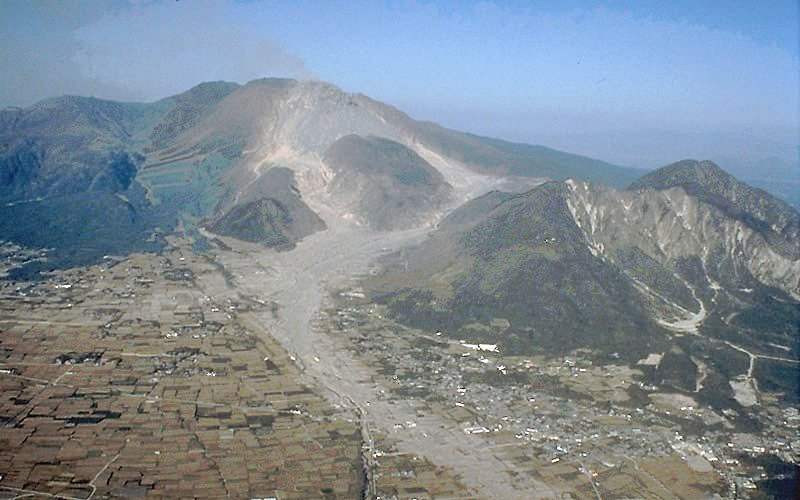
- Mt. Unzen after the 1991 eruption, showing extensive pyroclastic flow and lahar deposits

Highest point
- Elevation: 1,473 m (4,833 ft)
- Prominence: 1,465 m (4,806 ft)
- Listing: Ribu
- Coordinates: 32°45′41″N 130°17′55″E

Geography
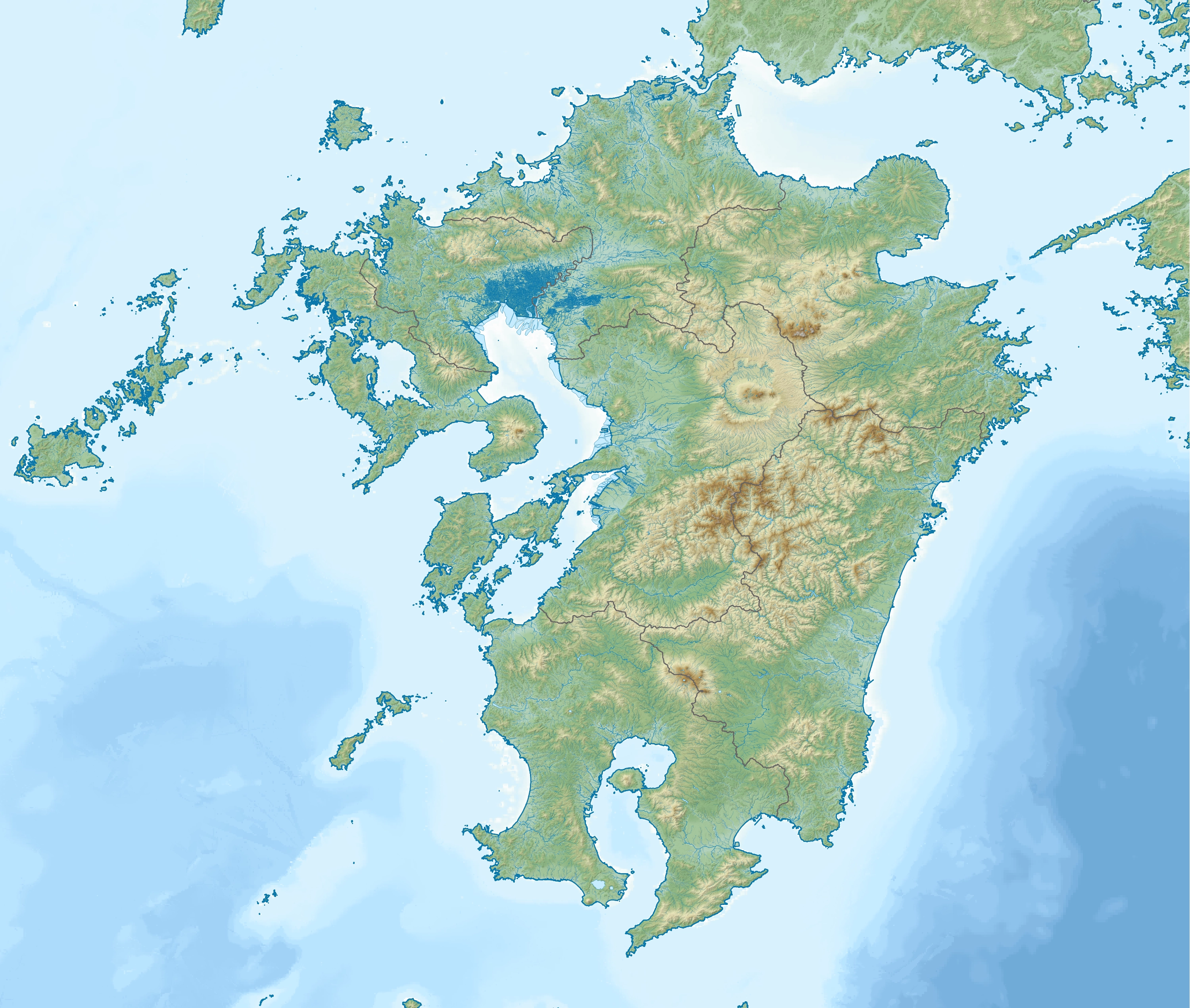
- Location within Japan Location within Kyushu Location within Nagasaki Prefecture Location within Kumamoto Prefecture
- Location: Unzen, Nagasaki, Kyushu, Japan

Geology
- Rock age: Oldest 500 kyr
- Mountain type: Complex stratovolcano
- Last eruption: February to May 1996

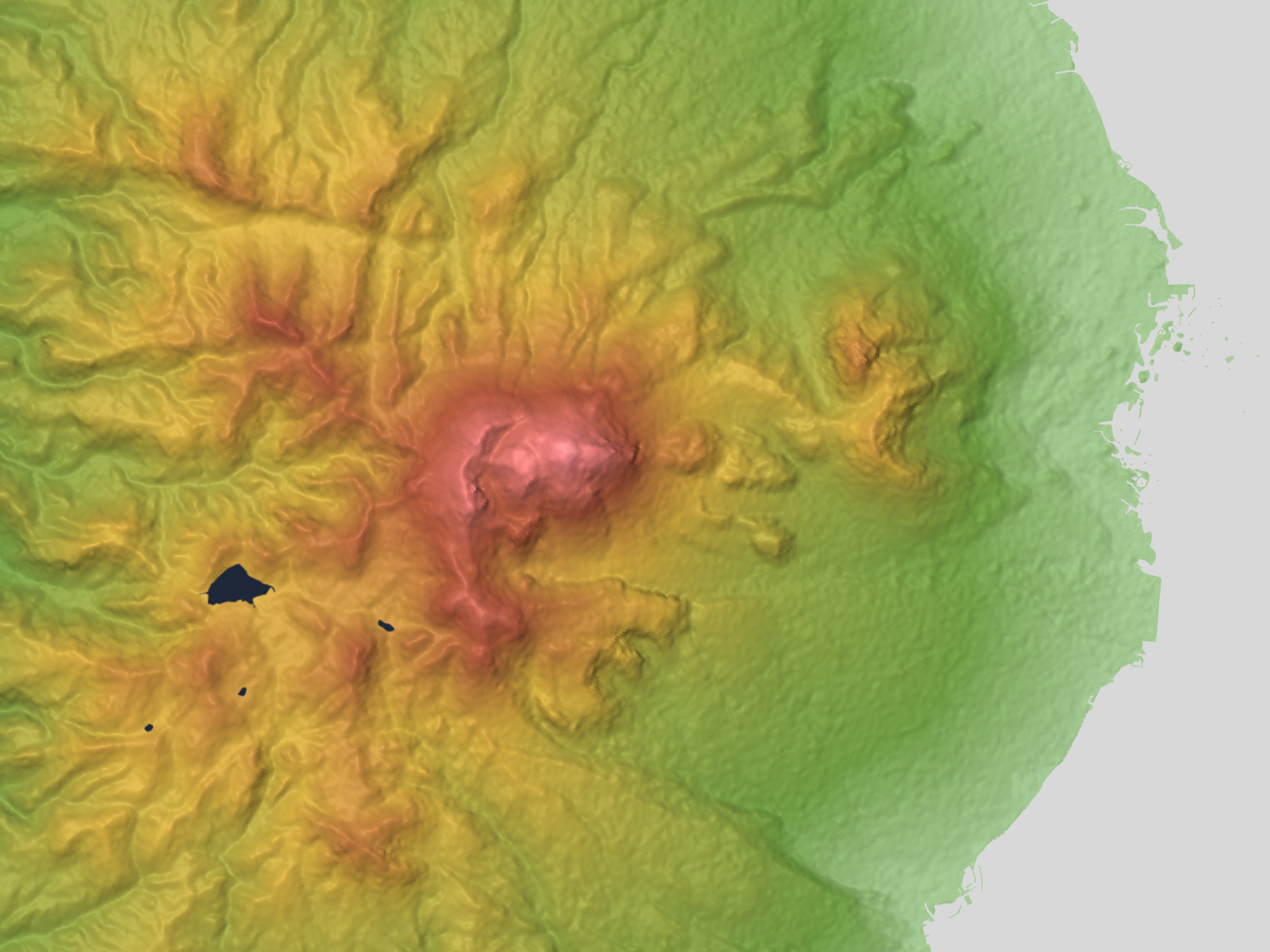
Relief map of Mount Unzen

Mount Unzen (雲仙岳, Unzen-dake; Japanese pronunciation: [ɯ̈́ǹ.d͡zè̞ɴ̀, ɯ̈̀ń.d͡zé̞ǹ.dä̀.kè̞, ɯ̈́ń.d͡zé̞ǹ-]) is an active stratovolcano of several overlapping small, volcanic cones, near the city of Shimabara, Nagasaki on the island of Kyushu, Japan's southernmost main island.

In 1792, the collapse of one of its several lava domes triggered a megatsunami that killed 14,524 people in Japan's worst volcanic-related disaster. The volcano was most recently active from 1990 to 1995, and a large eruption in 1991 generated a pyroclastic flow that killed 43 people, including three volcanologists.

Its highest peaks are Fugen-dake (普賢岳) at 1,359 metres (4,459 ft) and Heisei-shinzan (平成新山) at 1,486 metres (4,875 ft). The latter emerged during the eruptions of the early, eponymous Heisei era (1989–2019).

== Overview ==
Mount Unzen (or Unzen-dake) rises in the central part of the Shimabara Peninsula, Nagasaki Prefecture. It is located on the outer ring of the Chijiwa Caldera centering on Tachibana Bay in the west of the peninsula. It consists of a total of more than 20 mountains, however, the complexity in the shape of Unzen-dake was expressed by various numbers (such as Mitake Goho/Mimine Godake as "24th peak", or Yatsuha as "36th peak"). As a result, the usage of only eight mountains (sometimes three mountains) was coined in a narrow sense, but historically it is a name that refers to the entire mountain range towering over the sea. It is often confused with the name of the oldest peak, Fugen-dake.

Surrounding the highest peak of Heisei-shinzan (1,483 m (4,865 ft)), are Fugen-dake (1,359 m (4,459 ft)), Kunimi-dake (1,347 m (4,419 ft)), Myoken-dake (1,333 m (4,373 ft)), Nodake (1,142 m (3,747 ft)), Kusenbedake (1,062 m (3,484 ft)), and Yadake (943 m (3,094 ft)). Fugen-dake and Heisei-shinzan derive magma from the Chijiwa Caldera. In other words, it is supplied from a magma chamber beneath Tachibana Bay off Obama Onsen. The main peak is Fugen-dake, but the volcanic activity from 1990 (Heisei 2) to 1995 (Heisei 7) made Heisei-shinzan, which was higher in elevation. Heisei-shinzan is also the highest peak in Nagasaki Prefecture.

Unzen originally read "onsen" in the notation of a hot spring, but it was changed to the current notation when it was designated as a national park. An army radar base was built near the summit of Fugen-dake during the Pacific War, where about 100 people were stationed.

== Eruptive history ==
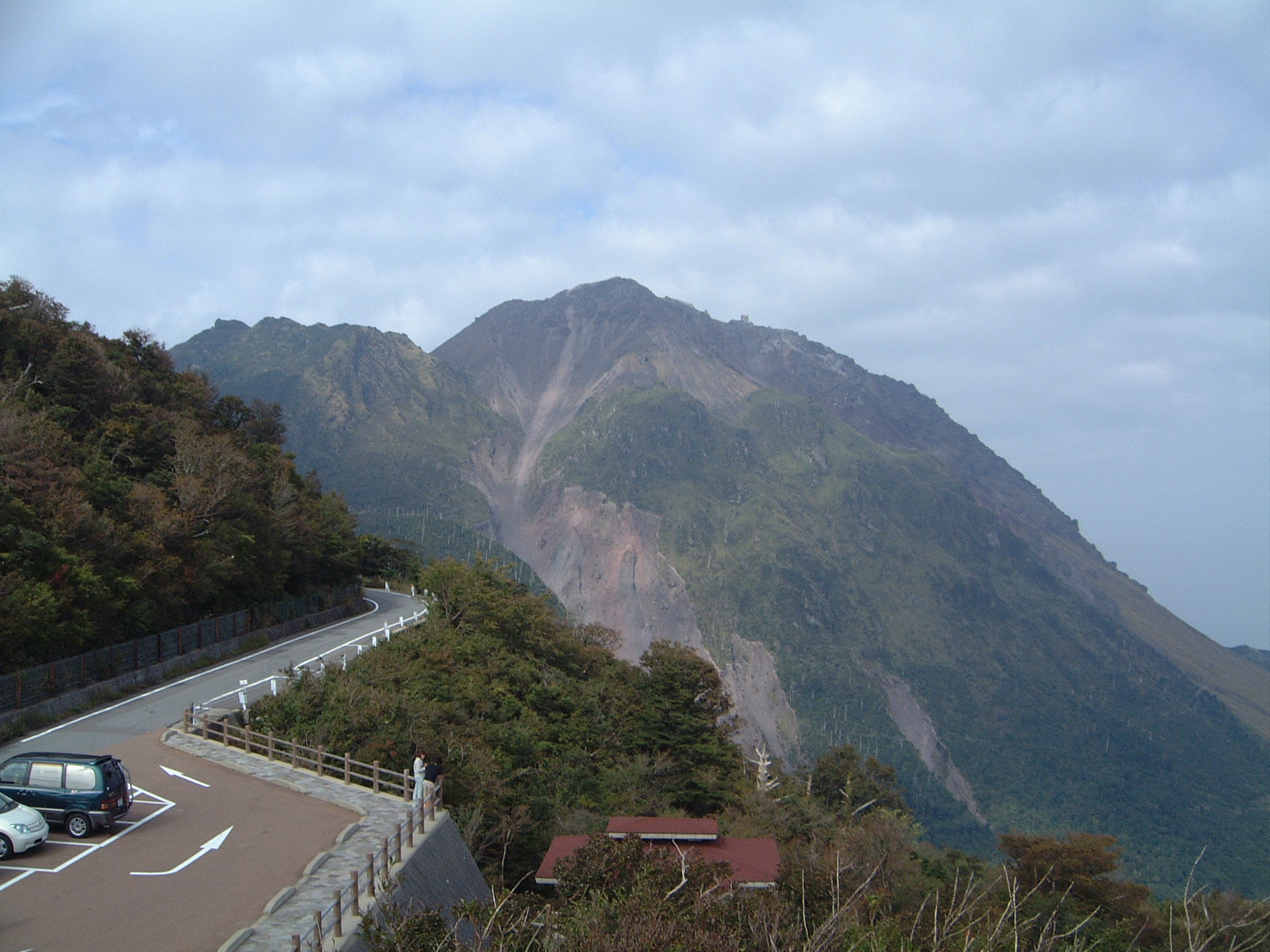
In the distance, Mt. Unzen's Fugen-dake (left) and Heisei-Shinzan peaks, the latter a lava dome that emerged during the 1990–1995 eruption, seen from Nita Pass in November 2005

Mount Unzen is part of the Shimabara Peninsula, which has seen extensive volcanism over millions of years. The oldest volcanic deposits in the region date from over 6 million years ago, and extensive eruptions occurred over the whole peninsula between 2.5 and 0.5 million years ago.

The origins of the Unzen complex are traced to the formation of a graben through crustal faulting. This caused parts of the peninsula to subside by up to 1,000 metres (3,300 ft) below sea level and may have caused eruptive activity to localize at one site inside the graben. Eruptions of dacitic lava began from a site slightly to the south of today's Mount Unzen and migrated north over time.

The volcano rapidly grew during its first 200,000 years, forming a very large cone. Later eruptions over the following 150,000 years filled in much of the graben. Initially, activity was dominated by blocky andesitic lava and ash flows, changing to dacitic pumice flows and airfall deposits from 500,000 to 400,000 years ago. The period from 400,000 to 300,000 years ago saw the emplacement of large areas of pyroclastic flow and lahar deposits; these form the major part of the volcanic fan surrounding the volcano. Beginning 300,000 to 150,000 years ago, thick phreatomagmatic deposits were laid down, suggesting the subsidence of the volcano into its graben was rapid during this period.

Activity from 150,000 years ago to the present has occurred at a number of sites around the volcanic complex, building four main domes at different times: the No-dake (70–150,000 years old), Myōken-dake (25–40,000 years old), Fugen-dake (younger than 25,000 years old) and Mayu-yama (4,000 years old) volcanic peaks. Fugen-dake has been the site of most eruptions during the past 20,000 years and lies about 6 kilometres (3.7 mi) from the center of Shimabara.

In December 1663, Fugen-dake erupted, producing lava flows that covered forest for over an extension of 1 km (0.62 mi). In the spring of the following year, there was a flood from the Kujuku Island crater, located on the southeastern flank of Fugen-dake at an altitude of 600 metres (2,000 ft). More than 30 were killed.

Unzen's deadliest eruption occurred in 1792, beginning with an earthquake in November of the previous year. On February 10, 1792, eruptions from Fugen-dake's Jigokuato crater began. Lava flows began on March 1 and continued for nearly two months. On March 22, volcanic plumes were produced, and lava also flowed out of the crater. On March 25, fumes rose and lava flowed down the northeastern part of Fugen-dake at a total length of 2.7 km (1.7 mi). Eventually, the east flank of the Mayu-yama dome collapsed unexpectedly following a post-eruption earthquake, creating a landslide into Ariake Bay. This caused a tsunami that killed an estimated 15,000 people. As of 2011 it is the worst volcanic related eruption in Japan.

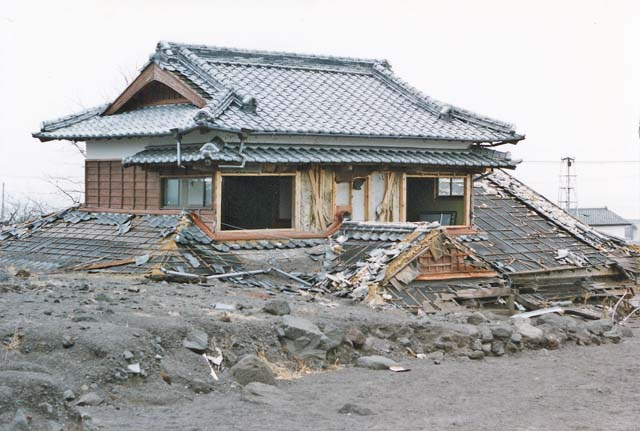
Devastation from Mt. Unzen's 1991 eruption

After 1792, the volcano remained dormant until it erupted again in November 1990. And a large-scale pyroclastic flow occurred on June 3, 1991, which killed 43 people. The volcanic activity finally subsided in 1995.

== Unzen Scientific Drilling Project (USDP) ==
In 1999, an ambitious project began at Mount Unzen to drill deep inside the volcano and sample magma in the 1990–1995 eruption conduit. The project hoped to shed light on some fundamental questions in volcanology, such as why magma repeatedly travels in the same conduits despite the solidification of magma in them at the end of each eruption, and how it can lose enough gas on its ascent to erupt effusively rather than explosively.

Drilling began with test bores to assess the viability of a deep borehole. Two holes were drilled, 750 metres (2,460 ft) and 1,500 metres (4,900 ft) deep, and cores taken from these holes were used to better determine Unzen's eruptive history. One further 350-metre (1,150 ft) deep borehole was drilled to test the methods to be used in the final drilling project.

The main drill began in 2003, starting from the northern flank of the volcano with a 440 mm (17 in) hole at an angle of 25 degrees from vertical. At greater depths, the direction of boring was tilted towards the conduit, reaching an angle of 75 degrees from vertical at a depth of 800 metres (2,600 ft). Drilling reached 1,800 metres (5,900 ft), the original target depth, without reaching the conduit, but in July 2004 at a depth of 1,995 metres (6,545 ft), the conduit was finally reached. The vertical depth below the summit was 1,500 metres (4,900 ft).

The temperature at the conduit was about 155 °C (311 °F), much lower than pre-drill estimations of 500 °C (932 °F) and over. This was attributed to hydrothermal circulation accelerating the cooling of the magma over the nine to ten years since the end of the eruption.

== Rivers ==
Arie River starts at Mount Unzen and flows to the Ariake Sea.

== Climate ==
Climate data for Mount Unzen, 1991–2020 normals, extremes 1924–present
Month	Jan	Feb	Mar	Apr	May	Jun	Jul	Aug	Sep	Oct	Nov	Dec	Year
Record high °C (°F)	17.3 (63.1)	18.2 (64.8)	21.2 (70.2)	25.3 (77.5)	29.4 (84.9)	31.0 (87.8)	32.8 (91.0)	34.3 (93.7)	31.6 (88.9)	28.9 (84.0)	22.9 (73.2)	18.6 (65.5)	34.3 (93.7)
Mean maximum °C (°F)	12.8 (55.0)	14.8 (58.6)	17.8 (64.0)	21.9 (71.4)	25.8 (78.4)	26.8 (80.2)	29.9 (85.8)	30.8 (87.4)	28.7 (83.7)	24.9 (76.8)	19.7 (67.5)	14.9 (58.8)	31.0 (87.8)
Mean daily maximum °C (°F)	6.1 (43.0)	7.7 (45.9)	11.2 (52.2)	16.1 (61.0)	20.5 (68.9)	22.7 (72.9)	25.8 (78.4)	27.2 (81.0)	24.5 (76.1)	19.8 (67.6)	14.2 (57.6)	8.6 (47.5)	17.0 (62.7)
Daily mean °C (°F)	2.5 (36.5)	3.6 (38.5)	6.8 (44.2)	11.5 (52.7)	15.9 (60.6)	19.2 (66.6)	22.5 (72.5)	23.3 (73.9)	20.4 (68.7)	15.3 (59.5)	10.0 (50.0)	4.7 (40.5)	13.0 (55.4)
Mean daily minimum °C (°F)	−0.7 (30.7)	−0.1 (31.8)	2.8 (37.0)	7.2 (45.0)	11.6 (52.9)	16.1 (61.0)	20.0 (68.0)	20.5 (68.9)	17.1 (62.8)	11.5 (52.7)	6.3 (43.3)	1.2 (34.2)	9.5 (49.0)
Mean minimum °C (°F)	−5.8 (21.6)	−5.3 (22.5)	−3.2 (26.2)	1.0 (33.8)	6.5 (43.7)	11.4 (52.5)	16.5 (61.7)	16.9 (62.4)	11.8 (53.2)	5.5 (41.9)	−0.1 (31.8)	−4.0 (24.8)	−6.8 (19.8)
Record low °C (°F)	−12.2 (10.0)	−12.8 (9.0)	−11.7 (10.9)	−6.0 (21.2)	1.3 (34.3)	7.6 (45.7)	13.0 (55.4)	12.9 (55.2)	8.1 (46.6)	0.3 (32.5)	−6.0 (21.2)	−10.2 (13.6)	−12.8 (9.0)
Average precipitation mm (inches)	88.2 (3.47)	129.2 (5.09)	202.5 (7.97)	253.3 (9.97)	265.1 (10.44)	575.4 (22.65)	513.6 (20.22)	314.4 (12.38)	260.7 (10.26)	132.8 (5.23)	123.5 (4.86)	103.1 (4.06)	2,961.8 (116.6)
Average snowfall cm (inches)	12 (4.7)	8 (3.1)	2 (0.8)	0 (0)	0 (0)	0 (0)	0 (0)	0 (0)	0 (0)	0 (0)	0 (0)	3 (1.2)	25 (9.8)
Average precipitation days (≥ 1.0 mm)	8.4	9.5	11.8	10.8	10.9	15.5	13.2	11.0	10.3	7.4	9.2	8.9	126.9
Average snowy days (≥ 1 cm)	3.0	2.6	0.9	0	0	0	0	0	0	0	0	0.6	7.1
Average relative humidity (%)	78	76	75	74	76	86	90	86	83	79	80	78	80
Mean monthly sunshine hours	88.4	101.9	133.6	149.7	159.6	94.2	105.8	132.3	123.6	140.6	108.8	96.4	1,436.6
Source: JMA

== See also ==
- List of Special Places of Scenic Beauty, Special Historic Sites and Special Natural Monuments
- List of volcanic eruptions by death toll
- List of volcanoes in Japan
- Mount Pinatubo
- Unzen Onsen
- Unzen Ropeway

== Bibliography ==
- Hoshizumi H., Uto K., Matsumoto A. (2001), Core stratigraphy of the Unzen Scientific Drilling: Volcanic History of the Unzen Volcano, Kyūshū, SW Japan, American Geophysical Union, Fall Meeting 2001
- Hoshizumi H., Uto K., Matsumoto A., Kurihara A. (2004), Growth History of Unzen Volcano, Kyūshū, Japan, American Geophysical Union, Fall Meeting 2004
- Sakuma S., Nakada S., Uto K. (2004), Unzen Scientific Drilling Project: Challenging drilling operation into the magmatic conduit shortly after eruption, American Geophysical Union, Fall Meeting 2004
- Uto K., Hoshizumi H., Matsumoto A., Oguri K., Nguyen H. (2001), Volcanotectonic history of Shimabara Peninsula and the evolution of Unzen volcano in Southwest Japan, American Geophysical Union, Fall Meeting 2001
- Uto K., Nakada S., Shimizu H., Sakuma S., Hoshizumi H. (2004), Overview and the achievement of the Unzen Scientific Drilling Project, American Geophysical Union, Fall Meeting 2004
