= Ariake Sea =

Body of salt water off the coast of Kyūshū, Japan

Coordinates: 32°54′25″N 130°22′20″E

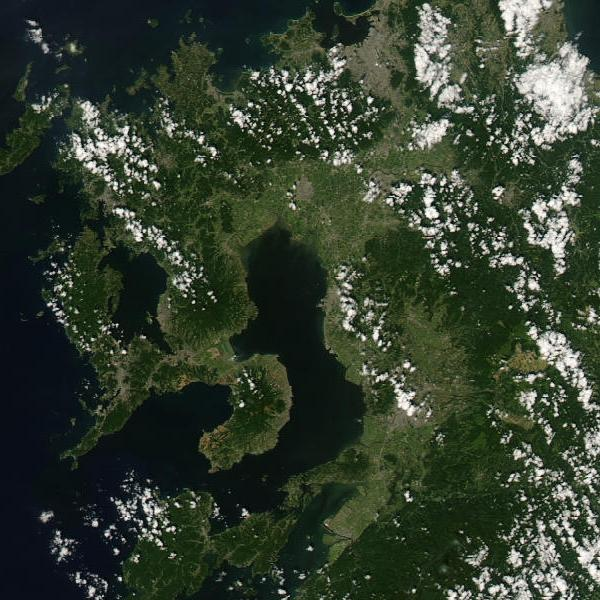
A NASA satellite image of the Ariake Sea in 2007

The Ariake Sea (有明海, Ariake-kai) is a body of salt water surrounded by Fukuoka, Saga, Nagasaki, and Kumamoto Prefectures, all of which lie on the island of Kyūshū in Japan. It is the largest bay in Kyūshū. Its deepest point is only about 20 meters deep, and extreme tides exceed 4 meters (13 ft), covering roughly 1,700 square kilometres (660 sq mi). Isahaya Bay is a branch of the Ariake Sea. Across the Amakusa Islands lies the Yatsushiro Sea.

Many harbors are located on the coast of the Ariake Sea. Among them are Misumi (in the city of Uki, Kumamoto Prefecture), Shimabara (Shimabara, Nagasaki), Taira (Unzen, Nagasaki), Nagasu (Nagasu, Kumamoto), Kumamoto (Kumamoto, Kumamoto), Miike (Omuta, Fukuoka), Kuchinotsu (Minamishimabara, Nagasaki), and Oniike (Amakusa, Kumamoto). Five ferry routes cross the Ariake Sea.

Various species of fauna, including mudskippers, pen shells (Atrina pectinata), and fiddler crabs, live in the Ariake Sea. In autumn, the Suaeda halophyte shichimenso (Suaeda japonica) grows along the shore.

The Ariake Sea has an extensive network of tidal flats, which are replenished with volcanic ash carried from Mount Aso and Mount Kujū to the sea by the Chikugo River. In addition to being used for fishing, every year around the end of May, the flats at Kashima serve as the venue for the Gatalympics, a novelty sports event.

Mount Unzen overlooks the Ariake Sea; the Arie River, which has its source on the volcano, flows into the Ariake Sea.

The Ariake Sea is used for aquaculture, with nori being a major product. Recent years have brought increasing pollution, with resultant red tides. There is ongoing land reclamation, as evidenced by satellite imagery, despite government attempts to dissuade farmers from carrying out the activity.

== See also ==
- 1792 Unzen earthquake and tsunami
- Kashima Gatalympics
- Shiranui, an optical phenomenon resembling fire which occurs along the coasts of the Ariake Sea
