= Arie River =

River in Nagasaki Prefecture, Japan

Coordinates: 32°39′10″N 130°18′3″E

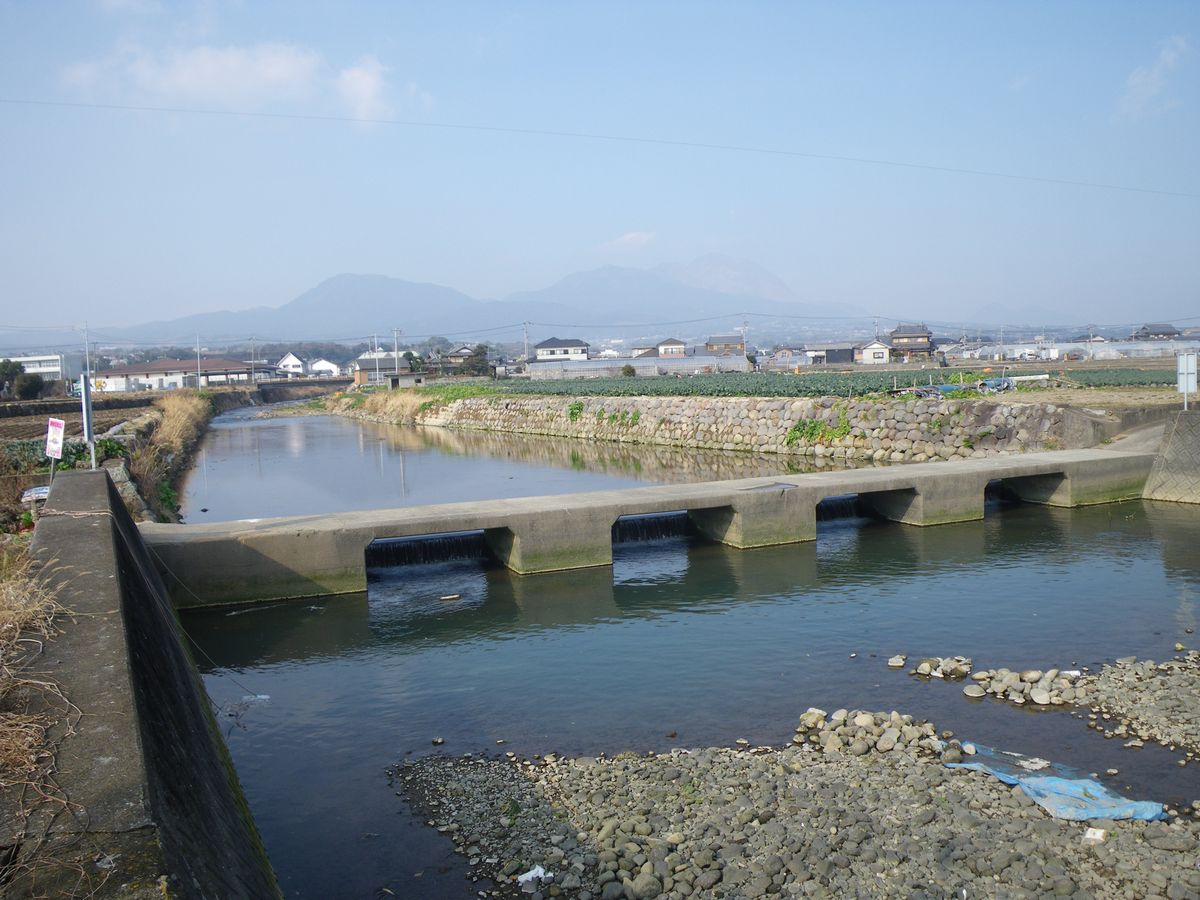

- Native name: 有家川 (Japanese)

Location
- Country: Japan

Physical characteristics
- Source
  - location: Mount Unzen
- Mouth
  - location: Ariake Sea
- Length: 12.5 km (7.8 mi)
- Basin size: 940 km^{2} (360 sq mi)

The Arie River (有家川, Arie-gawa) flows from Mount Unzen to the Ariake Sea in Nagasaki Prefecture, Japan.

== River communities ==
The river passes through or forms the boundary of the following communities:

Nagasaki Prefecture
Unzen, Minamishimabara
