= Timeline of Minamata disease =

The following is a timeline of key events related to Minamata disease:

| Date | Event |
|---|---|
| 1908 | Nichitsu opens a chemical factory in Minamata |
| 1932 | Acetaldehyde production using a mercury catalyst begins |
| 1945 | Japan is defeated in World War II. The Allied occupying forces order the dismissal of Nichitsu |
| 1950 | Shin Nichitsu is founded as the successor to the old company |
| August 1951 | The co-catalysed was changed from manganese dioxide to ferric sulfide resulting in side production of methylmercury |
| 1956 |
| 1 May | Company hospital director Hajime Hosokawa reports the discovery of Minamata disease |
| 24 August | Kumamoto University research group formed |
| 4 November | Kumamoto University research group reports initial suspicion of a heavy metal poisoning, presumably through eating contaminated fish |
| 1958 |
| March | British neurologist Douglas McAlpine suggests that Minamata disease symptoms resemble those of organic mercury poisoning |
| September | Shin Nichitsu changes the acetaldehyde plant wastewater discharge route from Minamata Bay to Minamata River |
| 1959 |
| February | Investigations of Minamata Bay uncover shocking mercury contamination |
| 29 August | Mediated compensation agreement between Chisso and the Minamata Fishing Cooperative for damage to fishing |
| 21 October | Shin Nichitsu changes the acetaldehyde plant wastewater discharge route back from Minamata River to Minamata Bay |
| 2 November | Members of the Kumamoto Prefectural Alliance of Fishing Cooperatives invade the Minamata factory and riot, causing damage amounting to JPY10 million |
| 12 November | The Ministry of Health and Welfare reports that "Minamata disease is a poisoning disease... caused by the consumption of large quantities of fish and shellfish living in Minamata Bay and its surroundings, the major causative agent being some sort of organic mercury compound." |
| 17 December | Mediated compensation agreement between Chisso and the Kumamoto Prefectural Alliance of Fishing Cooperatives for damage to fishing |
| 29 December | Mediated compensation agreement between Chisso and the Minamata Disease Patients Families Mutual Aid Society |
| 29 November 1962 | 18 children are certified as the first congenital Minamata disease victims |
| 1965 |
| 1 January | Shin Nichitsu changes its name to the Chisso Corporation |
| 12 June | The outbreak of a second Minamata disease in Niigata Prefecture is made public |
| 1968 |
| March | Niigata patients file a lawsuit against Showa Denko |
| 26 September | The national government issues an official conclusion as to the cause of Minamata disease and Niigata Minamata disease |
| 1969 |
| 14 June | Litigation Group of the Mutual Aid Society files a lawsuit against Chisso in the Kumamoto District Court |
| 1970 |
| 4 July | Hajime Hosokawa testifies from his deathbed about his cat experiments in the Litigation Group trial |
| 27 May | Arbitrated compensation agreement between Chisso and the Arbitration Group of the Mutual Aid Society |
| 1971 |
| 29 September | Showa Denko found guilty of negligence; Niigata patients win compensation |
| 1973 |
| 20 March | Chisso found guilty of negligence; Litigation Group patients win compensation |
| 1977 |
| 1977 | A net is installed around Minamata Bay to prevent toxic sludge and fish from contaminating other areas |
| 1997 |
| 1 September 1997 | The net surrounding Minamata Bay is removed and fish caught there are declared safe to eat |
| 2004 |
| 15 October 2004 | The Supreme Court of Japan rules that the national government was responsible for not preventing the spread of Minamata disease after 1960 |
