= 1965 Minamata disease outbreak in Niigata Prefecture =

Outbreak of severe mercury poisoning in Niigata, Japan

Minamata disease
- Specialty: Toxicology, Neurology, Psychiatry
- Symptoms: Ataxia, numbness and muscle weakness.
- Duration: Chronic
- Causes: Severe Mercury poisoning
- Risk factors: Proximity to Mercury pollution
- Prevention: Proper handling of industrial waste
- Prognosis: For more details see Mercury poisoning

From 1964 at the earliest to the 1970s at the latest, an outbreak of Minamata disease (水俣病, Minamata-byō) — a neurological syndrome caused by severe mercury poisoning — occurred in Niigata Prefecture, Japan. This would be the second outbreak of Minamata disease, the first occurring in its namesake: Minamata — a fishing village in Kumamoto Prefecture. The outbreak was caused by the release of methylmercury into the environment through the wastewater of a chemical plant owned by the Showa Electrical Company (Showa Denko), which had been producing mercury sulfate-catalysed acetaldehyde in nearby Kanose village. This highly toxic compound was released untreated into the Agano River where it bioaccumulated up the food chain, contaminating fish which, when eaten by local people, caused symptoms including ataxia, numbness in the hands and feet, general muscle weakness, narrowing of the field of vision, damage to hearing and speech, among others. This would often be followed by death.

A total of 690 people from the Agano River basin have been certified as patients of Niigata Minamata disease.

Since the Niigata outbreak was the second recorded in Japan and occurred in the Lower Agano River Basin, the event is sometimes referred to in Japanese as the Second Minamata disease (第二水俣病, Dai-ni Minamata-byō) or the Agano River Organic Mercury Poisoning (阿賀野川有機水銀中毒, Agano-gawa Yūki-suigin Chūdoku). It is one of the Four Big Pollution Diseases of Japan.

== History ==
=== Discovery ===
The second outbreak of Minamata disease in Niigata Prefecture was discovered in a very similar way to the original outbreak in Kumamoto Prefecture. From the autumn of 1964 to the spring of 1965, cats living along the banks of the Agano River had been seen to go mad and die: "...one cat ran into a small clay cooking stove containing burning charcoal. With the pupils of its eyes dilated, salivating, convulsing and uttering a strange cry, the cat breathed its last breath." These strange symptoms eventually began to appear in people, too. Professor Tadao Tsubaki of Niigata University examined two patients in April and May 1965 and suspected Minamata disease. One patient's hair was found to have a mercury level of 390 ppm. On 31 May, he reported an outbreak of organic mercury poisoning in the Agano River basin to the prefectural government and made his findings public on 12 June.

=== Investigation ===
Throughout 1965 and 1966, researchers from the Kumamoto University Research Group (that had been set up to investigate the original outbreak) and Dr. Hajime Hosokawa (the former Chisso hospital director) brought their significant experience from Minamata and applied it to the Niigata outbreak. Many lessons were learned from Minamata and the investigation into the cause of the outbreak proceeded much more smoothly than it had in Minamata. The prefectural government, Niigata University, citizens' organisations, and local people all worked together to uncover the cause. In March 1966, factory plant wastewater was reported to be suspected as the source of pollution, and in September, the Ministry of Health and Welfare announced it had discovered methylmercury in moss at the outlet of the Showa Denko factory in Kanose village.

=== Response of Showa Denko ===
Showa Denko responded to the outbreak of Niigata Minamata disease in a similar way that Chisso had responded in Minamata: by attempting to discredit the researchers while proposing their own theory. The company issued information leaflets that rejected their wastewater as the cause of the disease and suggested the cause might have been an "agricultural chemical run-off" that entered the river after the 1964 Niigata earthquake.

=== Patients' lawsuit ===
Unlike their counterparts in Minamata, the victims of Showa Denko's pollution lived a considerable distance from the factory and had no particular link to the company. As a result, the local community was much more supportive of patients' groups and a lawsuit was filed against the company in March 1968. The Niigata lawsuit was filed only three years after the outbreak had been made public in 1965. In contrast, the first lawsuit filed in Minamata happened in 1969, 13 years after the original outbreak was discovered.

On 26 September 1968, the government announced its official conclusion as to the cause of Niigata Minamata disease. The report said, although "the circumstances of the poisoning are extremely complex, and they are difficult to reproduce", the mercury had probably been discharged from the Kanose plant over a long period of time. However, the report did not rule out other causes and Showa Denko's president, Masao Yasunishi, insisted the company was not the cause of the outbreak.

The Niigata lawsuit was ultimately successful, and on 29 September 1971, the court found Showa Denko guilty of negligence. Families of deceased and congenital patients received JPY10 million each, surviving patients were awarded between JPY1 million and 10 million each, depending on symptoms, JPY400,000 were awarded to each individual contaminated by mercury, and JPY300,000 to every pregnant woman who had been told to have abortions due to the danger posed to their unborn children.

A family member of the deceased patient testified in court, "My father was crazed like a wild beast and then died—agonized, in pain... like a dog."

The events in Niigata catalysed a change in response to the original Minamata incident. The scientific research carried out in Niigata forced a re-examination of that done in Minamata and the decision of Niigata patients to sue the polluting company allowed the same response to be considered in Minamata. Masazumi Harada has said, "It may sound strange, but if this second Minamata disease had not broken out, the medical and social progress achieved by now in Kumamoto... would have been impossible."

== See also ==
- Heavy metal poisoning
- Mercury poisoning, a disease caused by exposure to the element mercury or its toxic compounds
- Ontario Minamata disease
