= Four Big Pollution Diseases of Japan =

Major toxicopathological disasters caused by pollution in Japan

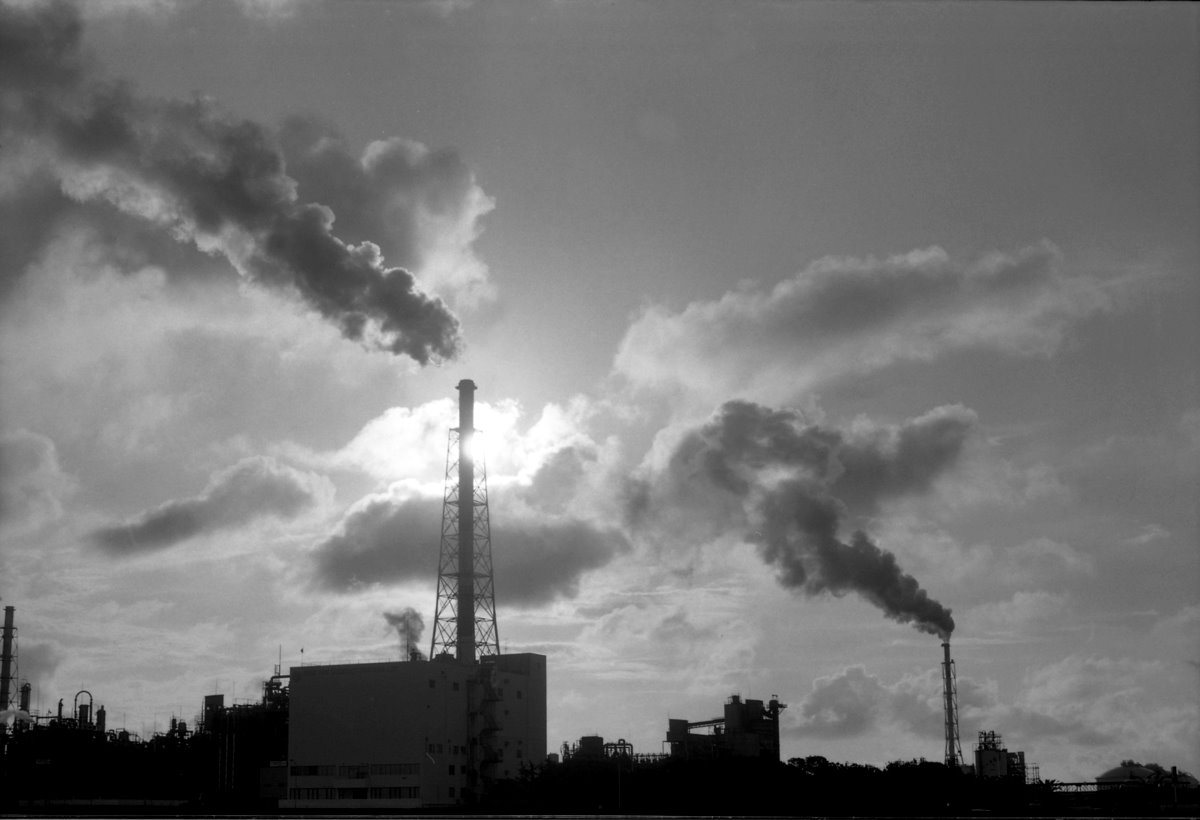

The four big pollution diseases of Japan (四大公害病, yondai kōgai-byō) were a group of man-made toxicopathological outbreaks during the 20th century in Japan. All instances were caused by environmental pollution that came from the chronic, improper handling of industrial waste by Japanese corporations. The first occurred in 1912, and the other three occurred in the 1950s and 1960s.

The term "four big pollution diseases" is a calque of the Japanese term used to describe these series. Taken literally, the term may be incorrectly taken to mean that each of the respective outbreaks manifested novel illnesses on their own. Contrarily, both outbreaks of Minamata disease were pathologically and etiologically the same, only differing in location and time.

Instance	Colloquialism	Japanese prefecture affected	Cause	Source	Year
Cadmium poisoning outbreak in Toyama	"Itai-itai disease"	Toyama Prefecture	Cadmium salts	Mitsui Mining & Smelting Company	1912
Mercury poisoning outbreak in Minamata	Minamata disease	Kumamoto Prefecture	Organomercury compounds	Chisso Corporation	1956
Mercury poisoning outbreak in Niigata	"Niigata Minamata disease"	Niigata Prefecture	Organomercury compounds	Showa Denko	1965
Asthmagen outbreak in Yokkaichi	"Yokkaichi asthma"	Mie Prefecture	Sulfur dioxide	Various sources	1961

Due to lawsuits, publicity, and other actions against the corporations responsible for the pollution, as well as the creation of the Environmental Agency in 1971, increased public awareness, and changes in industrial practices, the incidence of these kinds of diseases declined after the 1970s. These cases also set precedents for private tort law and civil law in issues of compensation for technology-related mass damage which continue to have repercussions in legal cases in Japan today.

== Itai-itai disease ==
Itai-itai disease first occurred in 1912 within Toyama Prefecture. This disease was given the name "itai-itai" because this was the phrase affected people would frequently cry out; it translates into "it-hurts it-hurts disease".

=== Cause of itai-itai ===
The cause of itai-itai disease was determined to be cadmium poisoning in the drinking water from the Jinzū River basin. The source of cadmium was discovered to be from Mitsui Mining and Smelting Company. Mitsui Mining began to discharge cadmium into the Jinzū River in 1910. The cadmium poisoned the river, thus poisoning locals' source of water. Any person who drank that water or ate food that was grown with the contaminated water, such as rice, would be likely to show signs of itai-itai disease.

=== Symptoms of itai-itai ===
The first symptoms were spine and leg pain. However, as the disease progresses symptoms include:

- debilitating pain
- bone fractures from mild traumas or activities (e.g., coughing or walking)
- skeletal deformities
- anemia
- kidney disorders

=== Aftermath of itai-itai ===
Most people with itai-itai disease were confined to bed because walking caused severe pain. Residents of the surrounding area that were harmed by this disease filed a lawsuit against Mitsui Mining & Smelting Company in 1968. Residents won this lawsuit and began to conduct negotiations. Mitsui Mining formally admitted that itai-itai disease was caused by their discharge of cadmium into the Jinzū River. Mitsui Mining was also obliged to pay recovery costs for the land. This meant that they had to ensure the poisoned land was returned to a safe and cultivable state.

== Minamata disease ==
The first report of Minamata disease was in Minamata in Kumamoto Prefecture in 1956. Many of the earliest patients became insane from the symptoms, and some died within a month of being affected. After an extensive investigation, the Minamata disease was identified as a heavy metal poisoning, specifically methylmercury poisoning, transmitted by the ingestion of contaminated fish from Minamata Bay. The methylmercury inside the contaminated fish attacked the affected patient's central nervous system, which caused a variety of symptoms.

=== Symptoms of Minamata disease ===
- numbing in the arms and legs
- impairment of balance
- fatigue
- ringing in the ears
- tunnel vision
- loss of hearing
- decrease in communication skills (slurred speech)

Most patients exhibited combinations of symptoms and did not show all symptoms.

=== Chisso Corporation ===
The cause of this contamination in Minamata bay was then traced back to Chisso Corporation's dumping of methylmercury into Minamata Bay. Chisso Corporation produced acetaldehyde using water, acetylene, mercury(II) sulfate as a catalyst and manganese dioxide or since August 1951, ferric sulfide as a co-catalyst. Acetaldehyde reacts with acetic anhydride in order to produce ethylidene diacetate, which is heated to produce vinyl acetate. Acetaldehyde was also used to produce acetic acid by oxidizing acetaldehyde and vinyl chloride, which is polymerized to make PVC.

The use of ferric sulfide had a downside: methylmercury (or organic mercury) was a by-product in the making of these chemicals due to its use. The methylmercury was then dumped into Minamata Bay as chemical waste. Chisso decided not to stop the use of the mentioned catalysts or the dumping of their byproducts into the bay until 1966. Today, Chisso makes compensation payments to all certified (recognized) patients of Minamata disease. Over 50 hectares of the bay were reclaimed, using the contaminated sludge from the bottom of the bay, with a non-contaminated layer of soil on top.

=== Aftermath of Minamata disease ===
In 1970, the Japanese Water Pollution Control Act was enacted, which states that all factories are required by law to regulate disposal of dangerous chemicals. In 1977, the Japanese government took on the task of cleaning Minamata Bay by vacuuming out 1.5 million cubic metres of methylmercury-contaminated sludge from the bottom of the bay and using them to reclaim over 50 hectares of the bay along with non-contaminated soil on top. In 1997, after fourteen years and $359 million, the Governor of Kumamoto Prefecture deemed Minamata Bay safe.

== Niigata Minamata disease ==
In 1965, a number of patients in Niigata Prefecture exhibited signs of Minamata disease. Niigata Minamata was caused by methylmercury poisoning in the Agano River basin. However, this second outbreak of Minamata disease was discovered early on. The degree of this outbreak was minimal compared to that of the first Minamata disease that took place in Kumamoto prefecture. Investigation of the cause of the disease was given to the Niigata University medical department. There were a number of factors that could be the cause of this outbreak. Along the Agano River basin there were several plants that used mercury in production, agricultural chemicals were widely used in the area, and the last possible cause of the outbreak was said to be the cause of an earthquake that took place a year before the disease was discovered in Niigata.

=== Symptoms of Niigata Minamata disease ===
As the name implies, Niigata Minamata disease is similar to Minamata disease; they both share the similar symptoms:

- numbness in the arms and legs
- impairment of balance
- fatigue
- ringing in the ears
- tunnel vision
- loss of hearing
- decrease in communication skills

=== Showa Denko ===
In the spring of 1966, the research team determined the most likely cause to the dumping of methylmercury from Showa Denko Corporation factory. Showa Denko was located upstream on the Agano River and, just like the Chisso corporation, produced methylmercury as a by-product and then dumped it into the Agano river. Much like Chisso corporation, Showa Denko declined all charges that they were at fault for the Niigata Minamata outbreak.

=== Aftermath of Niigata Minamata disease ===
After much controversy, Showa Denko was found guilty of negligence and was then forced to pay compensation payments to all those affected by Niigata Minamata disease. In the year that Niigata Minamata was discovered, 26 people were designated disease patients, and five died as a result of the methylmercury poisoning.

== Yokkaichi asthma ==
Yokkaichi is a city in the center of Japan in Mie Prefecture; known as the "town of petroleum" as it produces almost a quarter of the total petroleum in Japan. Construction of the first oil refinery in this area first began in 1955 and after construction many respiratory diseases emerged within the city and among neighboring districts.

=== Cause of Yokkaichi asthma ===
In the middle of this city was the largest heavy oil-fired power station and refinery in Japan during this time period. Unfortunately, this refinery was not equipped with machines that could lower sulfur dioxide emissions before releasing them into the air. In the early 1960s, respiratory diseases began to emerge in the general population of Yokkaichi and even in some neighboring districts. This increase in respiratory problems was then specified as Yokkaichi asthma. This form of asthma was prevalent within Yokkaichi—5–10% of inhabitants aged 40 in Yokkaichi were reported to have chronic bronchitis, whereas less than 3% had the same disease in non-polluted areas.

=== Yokkaichi asthma relief system ===
To offer support for many of the people affected by disease, a public release system for air pollution was established in 1965. This set forth that all people in the Yokkaichi area who met the following criteria were paid by the program:

1. Specific diseases such as bronchial asthma, chronic bronchitis, pulmonary emphysema, and their complications.
2. In specific areas where the prevalence of that disease has increased.
3. Three years of residence within the specified area.

Today, there are many laws regulating the amount of sulfur dioxide a factory can release into the air. These laws help keep the disaster of Yokkaichi Asthma from happening once again within Japan's borders.

== See also ==
- Environmental issues in Japan
- Nitrogen oxide
- Toroku arsenic disease
- Yushō disease
