= Yatsushiro Sea =

Inland sea in Japan

Coordinates: 32°20′N 130°25′E

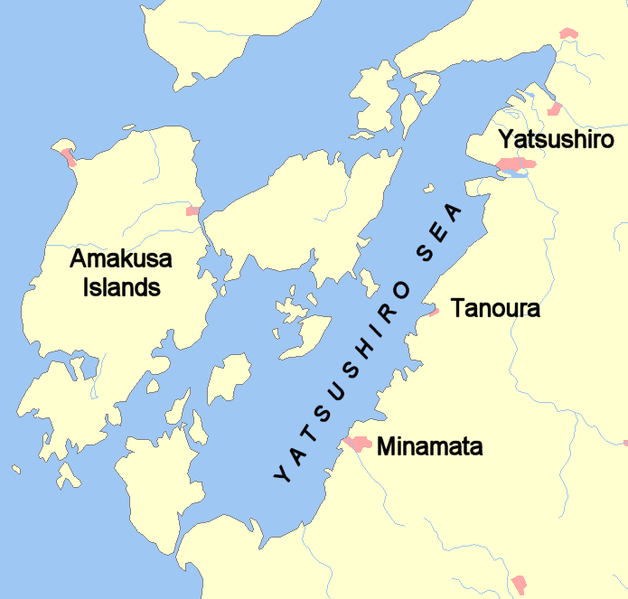
The Yatsushiro Sea and surroundings

The Yatsushiro Sea (八代海, Yatsushiro-kai), also called the Shiranui Sea (不知火海, Shiranui-kai), is a shallow semi-enclosed inland sea separating the island of Kyūshū from the Amakusa Islands. It lies mostly within Kumamoto Prefecture and at the southern end of the sea it also borders Kagoshima Prefecture. To the north is the Ariake Sea; to the south, the East China Sea. Cities of note that lie on the Yatsushiro Sea include Yatsushiro itself and Minamata.

== Mercury pollution ==
The sea was heavily polluted with mercury during the 1950s and 1960s from the Chisso Corporation's chemical factory in Minamata. This highly toxic chemical bioaccumulated in shellfish and fish in the Yatsushiro Sea which, when eaten by the local populace, gave rise to Minamata disease. The pollution disease was responsible for the deaths and disabling of thousands of residents, all around the Yatsushiro Sea. The marine ecosystem was also extensively damaged.

== Bibliography ==
Yoshida, F. (2006). Environmental restoration of Minamata: new thinking brings new advances. Integrated Research System for Sustainability Science, 2, 85-93

== See also ==
- Shiranui (optical phenomenon)
