= Minamata disease =

Severe neurological disease caused by mercury poisoning

- The hand of Iwazo Funaba - Photograph taken by W. Eugene Smith titled "Iwazo Funaba's Crippled Hand, Victim of Disease, 1971"
- Specialty: Toxicology, neurology, psychiatry
- Symptoms: Ataxia, numbness and muscle weakness
- Complications: Loss of peripheral vision, and damage to hearing and speech; in extreme cases: insanity, paralysis, coma; can also affect fetuses; see Mercury poisoning for more details
- Usual onset: Soon after consuming affected seafood
- Duration: Chronic
- Causes: Severe mercury poisoning
- Risk factors: Affected those who consumed fish and shellfish from Minamata Bay
- Diagnostic method: See mercury poisoning
- Differential diagnosis: See mercury poisoning
- Prevention: Proper handling of industrial waste
- Treatment: See mercury poisoning
- Medication: See mercury poisoning
- Prognosis: 35% case fatality rate; for more details see mercury poisoning

Minamata disease (Japanese: 水俣病, Hepburn: Minamata-byō) is a neurological disease caused by severe mercury poisoning. Symptoms include ataxia, numbness in the hands and feet, general muscle weakness, loss of peripheral vision, and damage to hearing and speech. In extreme cases, insanity, paralysis, coma, and death follow within weeks of the onset of symptoms. A form of the disease in babies, with microcephaly, extensive cerebral damage, and symptoms similar to those seen in cerebral palsy also occur.

Minamata disease was first discovered in the city of Minamata, Kumamoto Prefecture, Japan, in 1956. It was caused by the release of methylmercury in the industrial wastewater from a chemical factory owned by the Chisso Corporation, which continued from 1932 to 1968. It has also been suggested that some of the mercury sulfate in the wastewater was also metabolized to methylmercury by bacteria in the sediment. This highly toxic chemical bioaccumulated and biomagnified in shellfish and fish in Minamata Bay and the Shiranui Sea, which, when eaten by the local population, resulted in mercury poisoning. The poisoning and resulting deaths of both humans and animals continued for 36 years, while Chisso and the Kumamoto prefectural government did little to prevent the epidemic. The animal effects were severe enough in cats that they came to be named as having "dancing cat fever."

As of March 2001, 2,265 people had been officially recognized as having Minamata disease and over 10,000 had received financial compensation from Chisso. By 2004, Chisso had paid $86 million in compensation, and in the same year was ordered to clean up its contamination. On March 29, 2010, a settlement was reached to compensate as-yet uncertified victims.

A second outbreak of Minamata disease occurred in Niigata Prefecture in 1965. The original Minamata disease and Niigata Minamata disease are considered two of the Four Big Pollution Diseases of Japan.

== 1908–1955 ==
In 1908, the Chisso Corporation first opened a chemical factory in Minamata, Kumamoto Prefecture, located on the west coast of the southern island of Kyūshū. Initially producing fertilisers, the factory followed the nationwide expansion of Japan's chemical industry, branching out into production of acetylene, acetaldehyde, acetic acid, vinyl chloride, and octanol, among others. The Minamata factory became the most advanced in all of Japan, both before and after World War II. The waste products resulting from the manufacture of these chemicals were released into Minamata Bay through the factory wastewater. These pollutants had a deleterious environmental impact. Fisheries were damaged in terms of reduced catches; in response, Chisso reached two separate compensation agreements with the fishery cooperative in 1926 and 1943.

The rapid expansion of the Chisso factory spurred on the local economy, and as the company prospered so did Minamata. This fact, combined with the lack of other industry, meant that Chisso had great influence in the city. At one point, over half of the tax revenue of Minamata City authority came from Chisso and its employees, and the company and its subsidiaries were responsible for creating a quarter of all jobs in Minamata. The city was even dubbed Chisso's "castle town," in reference to the capital cities of feudal lords who ruled Japan during the Edo period.

The Chisso factory first started acetaldehyde production in 1932, with 210 tons that year. In 1951, production had jumped to 6,000 tons and eventually peaked at 45,245 tons in 1960. The factory's output historically amounted to between a quarter and a third of Japan's total acetaldehyde production. The chemical reaction used to produce the acetaldehyde employed mercury sulfate as a catalyst. Starting in August 1951, the co-catalyst was changed from manganese dioxide to ferric sulfide. A side reaction of this catalytic cycle led to the production of a significant amount (about 5% of the outflow) of extremely toxic and persistent methylmercury. As a result of the catalyst change, this compound was released into Minamata Bay regularly between 1951 and 1968, when this production method was finally discontinued.

== 1956–1959 ==
On 21 April 1956, a 5-year-old girl was examined at Chisso's factory hospital in Minamata. The physicians were puzzled by her symptoms: difficulty walking, difficulty speaking, and convulsions. Two days later, her younger sister also began to exhibit the same symptoms and she, too, was hospitalised. The girls' mother informed doctors that her neighbour's daughter was also experiencing similar problems. After a house-to-house investigation, eight further patients were discovered and hospitalised. On 1 May, the hospital director reported an "epidemic of an unknown disease of the central nervous system" to the local public health office, marking the official discovery of Minamata disease.

To investigate the epidemic, the city government and various medical practitioners formed the Strange Disease Countermeasures Committee at the end of May 1956. Owing to the localised nature of the disease, it was initially suspected to be contagious; patients were isolated and their homes disinfected as a precaution. Although contagion was later disproved, this initial response contributed to the stigmatisation and discrimination experienced by Minamata survivors from the local community. During its investigations, the Committee uncovered surprising anecdotal evidence of the strange behaviour of cats and other wildlife in the areas surrounding patients' homes. Reports of cats convulsing, going mad and dying started around 1950. Locals called it the "cat dancing disease" in reference to the cats' erratic movements. Crows had fallen from the sky, seaweed no longer grew on the seabed, and fish floated dead on the surface of the sea. As the extent of the outbreak was understood, the committee invited researchers from Kumamoto University (or Kumadai) to help in the research effort.

The Kumamoto University Research Group was formed on 24 August 1956. Researchers from the School of Medicine began visiting Minamata regularly and admitted patients to the university hospital for extensive examination. A more complete picture of the symptoms exhibited by patients was gradually uncovered. The disease struck without any prior warning, with patients complaining of a loss of sensation and numbness in their hands and feet. They became unable to grasp small objects or fasten buttons. They could not run or walk without stumbling, their voices changed in pitch, and many patients complained of difficulties seeing, hearing, and swallowing. In general, these symptoms worsened and were followed by severe convulsions, coma, and eventually death. By October 1956, forty patients had been discovered, fourteen of whom had died - an alarming case fatality rate of 35%.

=== Finding the cause ===
Researchers from Kumadai also began to focus on the cause of the strange disease. They found that the victims, often members of the same family, were clustered in fishing hamlets along the shore of Minamata Bay. The staple food of victims was invariably fish and shellfish from Minamata Bay. The cats in these areas, who often ate scraps from the family table, showed symptoms similar to humans. This led the researchers to believe that the outbreak was caused by some kind of food poisoning, with contaminated fish and shellfish being the prime suspects.

On 4 November, the research group announced its initial findings: "Minamata disease is rather considered to be poisoning by a heavy metal, presumably it enters the human body mainly through fish and shellfish."

=== Identification of mercury ===
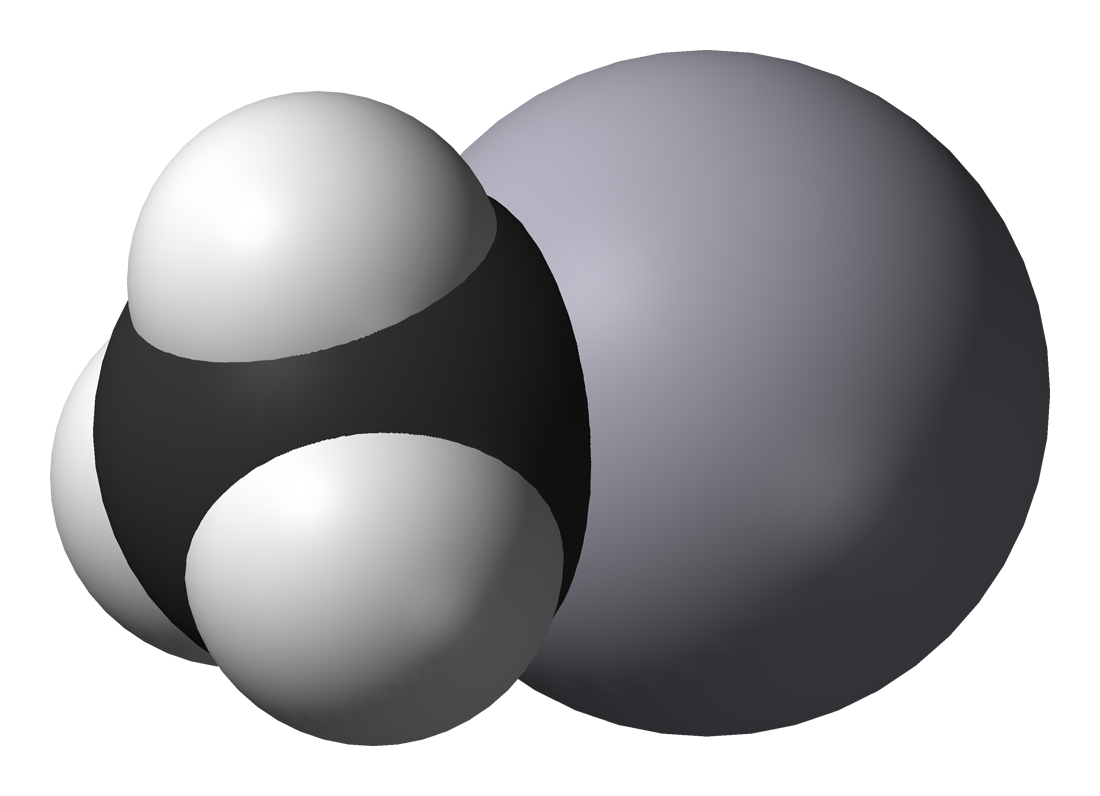
Methylmercury, an organic mercury compound released in factory wastewater and the cause of Minamata disease

As soon as the investigation identified a heavy metal as the causal substance, the wastewater from the Chisso factory was immediately suspected as the origin. The company's own tests revealed that its wastewater contained many heavy metals in concentrations sufficiently high enough to bring about serious environmental degradation, including lead, mercury, manganese, arsenic, thallium, and copper, plus the chalcogen selenium. Identifying which particular poison was responsible for the disease proved to be extremely difficult and time-consuming. During 1957 and 1958, many different theories were proposed by different researchers. At first, manganese was thought to be the causal substance due to the high concentrations found in fish and the organs of the deceased. Thallium, selenium, and a multiple contaminant theory were also proposed. In March 1958, visiting British neurologist Douglas McAlpine suggested that Minamata symptoms resembled those of organic mercury poisoning, which shifted the focus of the investigation to mercury.

In February 1959, researchers tested the waters of Minamata Bay for mercury. The results were shocking - high quantities of mercury were detected in fish, shellfish, and sludge from the bay. The highest concentrations centred around the Chisso factory wastewater canal in Hyakken Harbour, decreasing as it went out to sea, clearly identifying the plant as the source of contamination. At the mouth of the wastewater canal, a figure of 2 kg of mercury per ton of sediment was measured, a level so high that it would be economically viable to mine (Chisso later set up a subsidiary to reclaim and sell the mercury recovered from the sludge). Subsequent testing of the bay's marine life revealed that the industrial sludge contained high concentrations of methylmercury, which had bioaccumulated up the local food chain.

Hair samples were taken from the residents of Minamata and tested for mercury. In residents affected by the disease, the highest mercury level recorded was 705 parts per million (ppm), indicating very heavy exposure, and in asymptomatic Minamata residents, the highest level was 191 ppm. This compared to an average level of 4 ppm for people living outside the Minamata area.

On 12 November 1959, the Ministry of Health and Welfare's Minamata Food Poisoning Subcommittee published its results:

Minamata disease is a poisoning disease that affects mainly the central nervous system and is caused by the consumption of large quantities of fish and shellfish living in Minamata Bay and its surroundings, the major causative agent being some sort of organic mercury compound.

== 1959 ==
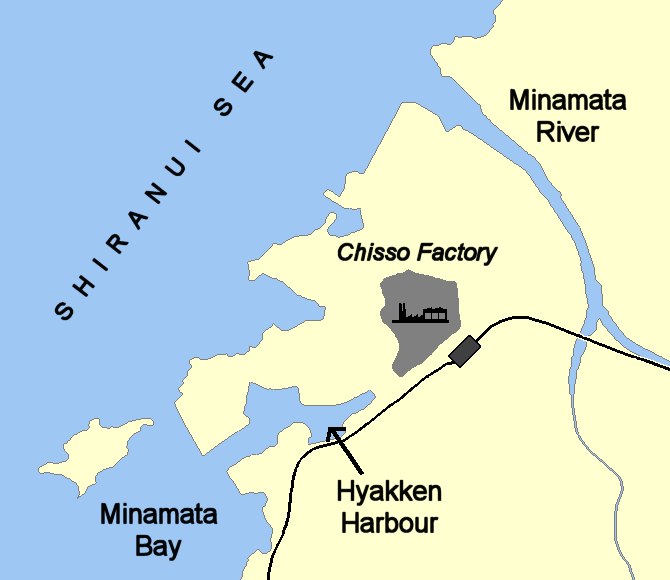
The Chisso factory and its wastewater routes

During the Kumadai investigation, the causal substance had been identified as a heavy metal and it was widely presumed that the Chisso factory was the source of the contamination. Chisso was coming under closer scrutiny and to deflect criticism, the wastewater output route was changed. Chisso knew of the environmental damage caused by its wastewater and was aware that it was the prime suspect in the investigation. Despite this, from September 1958, instead of discharging its waste into Hyakken Harbour (the focus of investigation and source of original contamination), it discharged wastewater directly into Minamata River. The immediate effect was the death of fish at the mouth of the river, and from that point on, new Minamata disease victims began to appear in other fishing villages up and down the coast of the Shiranui Sea as the pollution spread.

Chisso failed to co-operate with the Kumadai research team. It withheld information on its industrial processes, leaving researchers to speculate what products the factory was producing and by what methods. The Chisso factory's hospital director, Hajime Hosokawa, established a laboratory in the research division of the facility to carry out his own experiments into Minamata disease in July 1959. In one experiment, Hosokawa added factory wastewater to food that was then fed to healthy cats. Seventy-eight days into the experiment, cat 400 exhibited symptoms of Minamata disease, and pathological examinations confirmed a diagnosis of organic mercury poisoning. Chisso did not reveal these results to the investigators and ordered Hosokawa to stop his research.

In an attempt to undermine the Kumadai researchers' organic mercury theory, Chisso and other parties with a vested interest that the factory remain open (including the Ministry of International Trade and Industry and the Japan Chemical Industry Association) funded research into alternative causes of the disease, other than its own waste.

=== Compensation of fishermen and patients, 1959 ===
Polluting wastewater had damaged the fisheries around Minamata ever since the opening of the Chisso factory in 1908. The Minamata Fishing Cooperative had managed to win small payments of "sympathy money" from the company in 1926 and again in 1943, but after the outbreak of Minamata disease, the fishing situation became critical. Fishing catches declined by 91% between 1953 and 1957. The Kumamoto prefectural government issued a partial ban on the sale of fish caught in the heavily polluted Minamata Bay – but not an all-out ban, which would have legally obliged it to compensate the fishermen. The fishing cooperative protested against Chisso and angrily forced their way into the factory on 6 August and 12 August, demanding compensation. A committee was set up by Minamata Mayor Todomu Nakamura to mediate between the two sides, but this committee was stacked heavily in the company's favour. On 29 August, the fishing cooperative agreed to the mediation committee's proposal, stating: "In order to end the anxiety of the citizens, we swallow our tears and accept". Chisso paid the cooperative ¥20 million (US$183,477 — about US$1.7 million in 2021 value) and set up a ¥15 million ($137,608 — about 1.25 million today) fund to promote the recovery of fishing.

Protestors at the gates of the Chisso factory (W. Eugene Smith)

After Chisso changed the route of wastewater output in 1958, pollution had spread up and down the Shiranui Sea, damaging fisheries there as well. Emboldened by the success of the small Minamata cooperative, the Kumamoto Prefectural Alliance of Fishing Cooperatives also decided to seek compensation from Chisso. On 17 October, 1,500 fishermen from the alliance descended on the factory to demand negotiations. When this produced no results, the alliance members took their campaign to Tokyo, securing an official visit to Minamata by members of the Japanese Diet. During the visit on 2 November, alliance members forced their way into the factory and rioted, causing many injuries and ¥10 million ($100,000) in damage. The violence was covered widely in the media, bringing the nation's attention to Minamata for the first time since the outbreak began. Another mediation committee was set up, and an agreement was hammered out and signed on 17 December. Some ¥25 million of "sympathy money" was paid to the alliance, and a ¥65 million fishing recovery fund was established.

In 1959, those affected by Minamata disease were in a much weaker bargaining position than the fishermen. The recently formed Minamata Disease Patients Families Mutual Aid Society was much more divided than the fishing cooperatives. Patients' families were the victims of discrimination and ostracism from the local community. Local people felt that the company (and their city that depended upon it) was facing economic ruin. To some patients, this rejection from the community represented a greater fear than the disease itself. After staging a sit-in at the Chisso factory gates in November 1959, the patients asked Kumamoto Prefecture Governor Hirosaku Teramoto to include the patients' request for compensation with the mediation that was ongoing with the prefectural fishing alliance. Chisso agreed, and after a few weeks' further negotiation, another "sympathy money" agreement was signed. Patients who were certified by a Ministry of Health and Welfare committee would be compensated: adult patients received ¥100,000 ($917) per year; children ¥30,000 ($275) per year, and families of dead patients would receive a one-off ¥320,000 ($2935) payment.

=== Wastewater treatment ===
On 21 October 1959, Chisso was ordered by the Ministry of International Trade and Industry to reroute its wastewater drainage from the Minamata River back to Hyakken Harbour, and to speed up the installation of wastewater treatment systems at the factory. Chisso installed a Cyclator purification system on 19 December 1959, and opened it with a special ceremony. Chisso's president Kiichi Yoshioka drank a glass of water supposedly treated through the Cyclator to demonstrate that it was safe. In fact, the wastewater from the factory, which the company knew still contained mercury and led to Minamata disease when fed to cats, was not being treated through the Cyclator at the time. Testimony at a later Niigata Minamata disease trial proved that Chisso knew the Cyclator to be completely ineffective: "The purification tank was installed as a social solution and did nothing to remove organic mercury."

The deception was successful, and almost all parties affected by Minamata disease were duped into believing that the factory's wastewater had been made safe from December 1959 onward. This widespread assumption meant that doctors were not expecting new patients to appear, resulting in numerous problems in the years to follow as the pollution continued. In most people's minds, the issue of Minamata disease had been resolved.

== 1959–1969 ==
The years between the first set of "sympathy money" agreements in 1959 and the start of the first legal action to be taken against Chisso in 1969 are often called the "ten years of silence." This was inaccurate - much activity on the part of the patients and fishermen took place during this period, but nothing had a significant impact on the actions of the company or the coverage of Minamata in the Japanese media.

=== Continued pollution ===
Despite the almost universal assumption to the contrary, the wastewater treatment facilities installed in December 1959 had no effect on the level of organic mercury being released into the Shiranui Sea. The pollution and the disease it caused continued to spread. The Kumamoto and Kagoshima prefectural governments conducted a joint survey in late 1960 and early 1961 to measure the level of mercury in the hair of people living around the Shiranui Sea. The results confirmed that organic mercury had spread all around the inland sea and that people were still being poisoned by contaminated fish. Hundreds of people were discovered to have levels greater than 50 ppm of mercury in their hair, the level at which people are likely to experience nerve damage. The highest result recorded was that of a woman from Goshonoura island whose sample had a mercury level of 920 ppm.

The prefectural governments did not publish the results and did nothing in response to these surveys. The participants who had donated hair samples were not informed of their results, even when they requested them. A follow-up study ten years later discovered that many had died from "unknown causes" during this time period.

=== Congenital Minamata disease ===
Local doctors and medical officials had noticed an abnormally high frequency of cerebral palsy and other infantile disorders in the Minamata area. In 1961, a number of medical professionals, including Masazumi Harada (later to be honored by the United Nations for his body of work on Minamata disease), set about re-examining children diagnosed with cerebral palsy. The symptoms of the children closely mirrored those of adult Minamata disease patients, but many of their mothers did not exhibit symptoms. The fact that these children had been born after the initial outbreak and had never been fed contaminated fish also led their mothers to believe they were not victims. At the time, the medical establishment believed the placenta would protect the foetus from toxins in the bloodstream, which is the case with most chemicals, but in the case of methylmercury the placenta removes it from the mother's bloodstream and concentrates it in the foetus. This was unknown at the time.

After several years of study and the autopsies of two children, the doctors announced that these children had an as-yet unrecognised congenital form of Minamata disease. The certification committee convened on 29 November 1962 and agreed that the two dead children and the sixteen children still alive should be certified as patients, and therefore liable for "sympathy money" from Chisso, in line with the 1959 agreement.

=== Outbreak of Niigata Minamata disease ===
Minamata disease broke out again in 1965, this time along the banks of the Agano River in Niigata Prefecture. The polluting factory (owned by Showa Denko) employed a chemical process using a mercury catalyst very similar to that used by Chisso in Minamata. As in Minamata, from the autumn of 1964 to the spring of 1965, cats living along the banks of the Agano River had been seen to go mad and die. Before long, patients appeared with identical symptoms to patients living on the Shiranui Sea, and the outbreak was made public on 12 June 1965. Researchers from the Kumamoto University Research Group and Hajime Hosokawa (who had retired from Chisso in 1962) used their experience from Minamata and applied it to the Niigata outbreak. In September 1966, a report was issued proving Showa Denko's pollution to be the cause of this second Minamata disease outbreak.

Unlike the patients in Minamata, the victims of Showa Denko's pollution lived a considerable distance from the factory and had no particular link to the company. As a result, the local community was much more supportive of patients' groups and a lawsuit was filed against Showa Denko in March 1968, only three years after discovery.

The events in Niigata catalysed a change in response to the original Minamata incident. The scientific research carried out in Niigata forced a re-examination of that done in Minamata, and the decision of Niigata patients to sue the polluting company allowed the same response to be considered in Minamata. Masazumi Harada has said that, "It may sound strange, but if this second Minamata disease had not broken out, the medical and social progress achieved by now in Kumamoto... would have been impossible."

Around this time, two other pollution-related diseases were also grabbing headlines in Japan. People with Yokkaichi asthma and itai-itai disease were forming citizens' groups and filed lawsuits against the polluting companies in September 1967 and March 1968, respectively. As a group, these diseases came to be known as the four big pollution diseases of Japan.

Slowly but surely, the mood in Minamata and Japan as a whole was shifting. Minamata patients found the public gradually becoming more receptive and sympathetic as the decade wore on. This culminated in 1968 with the establishment in Minamata of the Citizens' Council for Minamata Disease Countermeasures, which was to become the chief citizens' support group to the Minamata patients. A founding member of the citizens' council was Michiko Ishimure, a local housewife and poet who later that year published Pure Land, Poisoned Sea: Our Minamata disease, a book of poetic essays that received national acclaim.

== 1969–1973 ==
=== Official government recognition ===
Finally on 26 September 1968 – twelve years after the discovery of the disease (and four months after Chisso had stopped production of acetaldehyde using its mercury catalyst) – the Japanese government issued an official conclusion as to the cause of Minamata disease:

Minamata disease is a disease of the central nervous system, a poisoning caused by long-term consumption, in large amounts, of fish and shellfish from Minamata Bay. The causative agent is methylmercury. Methylmercury produced in the acetaldehyde acetic acid facility of Shin Nihon Chisso's Minamata factory was discharged in factory wastewater... Minamata disease patients last appeared in 1960, and the outbreak has ended. This is presumed to be because consumption of fish and shellfish from Minamata Bay was banned in the fall of 1957, and the fact that the factory had waste-treatment facilities in place from January 1960.

The conclusion contained many factual errors: eating fish and shellfish from other areas of the Shiranui Sea, not just Minamata Bay, could cause the disease; eating small amounts, as well as large amounts of contaminated fish over a long time also produced symptoms; the outbreak had not, in fact, ended in 1960 nor had mercury-removing wastewater facilities been installed in January 1960. Nevertheless, the government announcement brought a feeling of relief to a great many victims and their families. Many felt vindicated in their long struggle to force Chisso to accept responsibility for causing the disease and expressed thanks that their plight had been recognised by their social superiors. The struggle now focused on to what extent the victims should be compensated.

=== Struggle for a new agreement ===
In light of the government announcement, the patients of the Mutual Aid Society decided to ask for a new compensation agreement with Chisso and submitted the demand on 6 October. Chisso replied that it was unable to judge what would be fair compensation and asked the Japanese government to set up a binding arbitration committee to decide. This proposal split the members of the patients' society, many of whom were extremely wary of entrusting their fate to a third party, as they had done in 1959 with unfortunate results. At a meeting on the 5 April 1969, the opposing views within the society could not be reconciled and the organisation split into the pro-arbitration group and the litigation group (who decided to sue the company). That summer, Chisso sent gifts to the families who opted for arbitration rather than litigation.

Minamata patients and family members hold photographs of their dead during a demonstration (W. E. Smith)

An arbitration committee was duly set up by the Ministry of Health and Welfare on 25 April, but it took almost a year to draw up a draft compensation plan. A newspaper leak in March 1970 revealed that the committee would ask Chisso to pay only ¥2 million ($5,600) for dead patients and ¥140,000 to ¥200,000 ($390 to $560) per year to surviving patients. The arbitration group were dismayed by the sums on offer. They petitioned the committee, together with patients and supporters of the litigation group, for a fairer deal. The arbitration committee announced their compensation plan on 25 May in a disorderly session at the Ministry of Health and Welfare in Tokyo. Thirteen protesters were arrested.

Instead of accepting the agreement as they had promised, the arbitration group asked for increases. The committee was forced to revise its plan and the patients waited inside the ministry building for two days while they did so. The final agreement was signed on 27 May. Payments for deaths ranged from ¥1.7 million to ¥4 million ($4,700 to $11,100), one-time payments from ¥1 million to ¥4.2 million ($2,760 to $11,660) and annual payments between ¥170,000 and ¥380,000 ($470 to $1,100) for surviving patients. On the day of the signing, the Minamata Citizens' Council held a protest outside the Chisso factory gates. One of the Chisso trade unions held an eight-hour strike in protest at the poor treatment of the arbitration group by their own company.

The litigation group, representing 41 certified patients (17 already deceased) in 28 families, submitted their suit against Chisso in the Kumamoto District Court on 14 June 1969. The leader of the group, Eizō Watanabe (a former leader of the Mutual Aid Society), declared, "Today, and from this day forth, we are fighting against the power of the state." Those who decided to sue the company came under fierce pressure to drop their lawsuits. One woman was visited personally by a Chisso executive and harassed by her neighbours. She was blackballed by the community, her family's fishing boat used without permission, their fishing nets were cut, and human faeces were thrown at her in the street.

The litigation group and their lawyers were helped substantially by an informal national network of citizens' groups that had sprung up around the country in 1969. The Associations to Indict those Responsible for Minamata Disease were instrumental in raising awareness and funds for the lawsuit. The Kumamoto branch, in particular, was especially helpful to the case. In September 1969, they set up a Trial Research Group, which included law professors, medical researchers (including Harada), sociologists and even Michiko Ishimure to provide useful material to the lawyers to improve their legal arguments. Their report, Corporate Responsibility for Minamata Disease: Chisso's Illegal Acts, published in August 1970, formed the basis of the ultimately successful lawsuit.

The trial lasted almost four years. The litigation group's lawyers sought to prove Chisso's corporate negligence. Three main legal points had to be overcome to win the case. First, the lawyers had to show that methylmercury caused Minamata disease and that the company's factory was the source of pollution. The extensive research by Kumadai and the government's conclusion meant that this point was proved quite easily. Second, they needed to show that Chisso could and should have anticipated the effect of its wastewater and taken steps to prevent the tragedy (i.e., was the company negligent in its duty of care). Third, it had to disprove that the "sympathy money" agreement of 1959, which forbade the patients from claiming any further compensation, was a legally binding contract.

The trial heard from patients and their families, but the most important testimony came from Chisso executives and employees. The most dramatic testimony came from Hosokawa, who spoke on 4 July 1970 from his hospital bed where he was dying of cancer. Hosokawa explained his experiments with cats, including the infamous "cat 400", which developed Minamata disease after being fed factory wastewater. He also spoke of his opposition to the 1958 change in wastewater output route to Minamata River. Hosokawa's testimony was backed up by a colleague who also told how Chisso officials had ordered them to halt their cat experiments in the autumn of 1959. Hosokawa died three months after giving his testimony. Former factory manager Eiichi Nishida admitted that the company put profits ahead of safety, resulting in dangerous working conditions and a lack of care with mercury. Former Chisso President Kiichi Yoshioka admitted that the company promoted a theory of dumped World War II explosives, though it knew it to be unfounded.

The verdict handed down on 20 March 1973 represented a complete victory for the patients of the litigation group:

The defendant's factory was a leading chemical plant with the most advanced technology and ... should have assured the safety of its wastewater. The defendant could have prevented the occurrence of Minamata disease or at least have kept it at a minimum. We cannot find that the defendant took any of the precautionary measures called for in this situation whatsoever. The presumption that the defendant had been negligent from beginning to end in discharging wastewater from its acetaldehyde plant is amply supported. The defendant cannot escape liability for negligence.

The "sympathy money" agreement was found to be invalid and Chisso was ordered to make one-time payments of ¥18 million ($66,000) for each deceased patient and from ¥16 million to ¥18 million ($59,000 to $66,000) for each surviving patient. The total compensation of ¥937 million ($3.4 million) was the largest sum ever awarded by a Japanese court.

=== Uncertified patients' fight to be recognised ===
While the struggles of the arbitration and litigation groups against Chisso were continuing, a new group of individuals with Minamata disease emerged. To qualify for compensation under the 1959 agreement, patients had to be officially recognised by various ad hoc certification committees according to their symptoms. However, in an effort to limit the liability and financial burden on the company, these committees were sticking to a rigid interpretation of Minamata disease. They required that patients must exhibit all symptoms of Hunter-Russell syndrome – the standard diagnosis of organic mercury poisoning at the time, which originated from an industrial accident in the United Kingdom in 1940. The committee certified only patients exhibiting explicit symptoms of the British syndrome, rather than basing their diagnosis on the disease in Japan. This resulted in many applicants being rejected by the committee, leaving them confused and frustrated.

== Legacies ==
=== Epidemiology ===
As of March 2001, 2,265 victims had been officially certified and over 10,000 people had received financial compensation from Chisso, although they were not recognised as official victims. The issue of quantifying the impact of Minamata disease is complicated, as a full epidemiological study has never been conducted and patients were recognised only if they voluntarily applied to a certification council to seek financial compensation. Many individuals with Minamata disease faced discrimination and ostracism from the local community if they came out into the open about their symptoms. Some people feared the disease to be contagious, and many local people were fiercely loyal to Chisso, depending on the company for their livelihoods. In this atmosphere, those affected were reluctant to come forward and seek certification. Despite these factors, over 17,000 people have applied to the council for certification. Also, in recognising an applicant as having Minamata disease, the certification council qualified that patient to receive financial compensation from Chisso. For that reason, the council has always been under immense pressure to reject claimants and minimise the financial burden placed on Chisso. Rather than being a council of medical recognition, the decisions of the council were always affected by the economic and political factors surrounding Minamata and the Chisso corporation. Furthermore, compensation of the victims led to continued strife in the community, including unfounded accusations that some of the people who sought compensation did not actually have the disease. More properly, the impact should be called a criminal 'poisoning', not a clinical 'disease'. These forms of obfuscation are commonly experienced by 'environmental victims' in many countries.

In 1978, the National Institute for Minamata Disease was established in Minamata. It consists of four departments: The Department of Basic Medical Science, The Department of Clinical Medicine, The Department of Epidemiology and The Department of International Affairs and Environmental Sciences. In 1986, The Institute became a WHO Collaborating Centre for Studies on the Health Effects of Mercury Compounds. The Institute seeks to improve medical treatment of Minamata disease patients and conducts research on mercury compounds and their impact on organisms as well as potential detoxification mechanisms. In April, 2008 the Institute invented a method for absorbing gaseous mercury in order to prevent air pollution and enable recycling of the metal.

=== Environmental protection ===
The movement for redress by Minamata victims and activists and the national outrage their movement elicited played a central role in the rise of environmental protection in Japan. The 1970 session of the Japanese Diet became remembered as the "Pollution Diet", as the Japanese government took action under rising pressure from the Minamata disease movement as well as other major environmental catastrophes such as Yokkaichi asthma and itai-itai disease. Fourteen new environmental laws were passed in a single session, giving Japan what at the time were the most stringent environmental protection laws in the world. These new laws included a Water Pollution Act and nationwide regulations of toxic discharges. The "polluter pays" principle was introduced. A national Environmental Agency, which later developed into the Ministry of Environment, was founded in 1971. National governmental expenditures on environmental issues almost doubled between 1970 and 1975 and tripled at the local government level.

=== Democratizing effects ===
According to historian Timothy S. George, the environmental protests that surrounded the disease appeared to aid in the democratization of Japan. When the first cases were reported and subsequently suppressed, the rights of the victims were not recognised, and they were given no compensation. Instead, the affected were ostracised from their community due to ignorance about the disease, as people were afraid that it was contagious.

The people directly impacted by the pollution of Minamata Bay were not originally allowed to participate in actions that would affect their future. Disease victims, fishing families, and company employees were excluded from the debate. Progress occurred when Minamata victims were finally allowed to come to a meeting to discuss the issue. As a result, postwar Japan took a small step toward democracy.

Through the evolution of public sentiments, the victims and environmental protesters were able to acquire standing and proceed more effectively in their cause. The involvement of the press also aided the process of democratization because it caused more people to become aware of the facts of Minamata disease and the pollution that caused it. However, although the environmental protests did result in Japan becoming more democratized, it did not completely rid Japan of the system that first suppressed the fishermen and individuals with Minamata disease.

=== Popular culture ===
Toshiko Akiyoshi, touched by the plight of the fishing village, wrote a jazz suite, "Minamata", that was to be the central piece of the Toshiko Akiyoshi-Lew Tabackin Big Band's 1976 album on RCA, Insights. The piece was constructed in three parts, to musically reflect the tragedy – "Peaceful Village", "Prosperity & Consequence", and "Epilogue". Akiyoshi used Japanese vocalists to sing the Japanese lyrics of a tone poem that were part of the composition. The album won many awards in jazz circles, including Downbeat's best album award, largely on the strength of this piece, which brought some further attention to the tragedy.

The song "Kepone Factory" on Dead Kennedys' In God We Trust, Inc. makes reference to the disaster in its chorus.

The song "The Disease of the Dancing Cats" by the band Bush on the album The Science of Things is in reference to the disaster.

In 2021 a manga/comic book about Minamata disease was made with the cooperation of various disease suffers and long term helper and activist, Takeko Kato. The Scottish writer Sean Michael Wilson and Japanese artist Akiko Shimojima collaborated on the book, called The Minamata Story: an ecotragedy, which was published in English by Stonebridge Press, and went on to win two awards.

=== Visual documentation ===
Photographic documentation of Minamata started in the early 1960s. One photographer who arrived in 1960 was Shisei Kuwabara, straight from university and photo school, who had his photographs published in Weekly Asahi as early as May 1960. The first exhibition of his photographs of Minamata was held in the Fuji Photo Salon in Tokyo in 1962, and the first of his book-length anthologies, Minamata Disease, was published in Japan in 1965. He has returned to Minamata many times since.

A dramatic photographic essay by W. Eugene Smith brought world attention to Minamata disease. He and his Japanese wife lived in Minamata from 1971 to 1973. The most famous and striking photo of the essay, Tomoko and Mother in the Bath (1972), shows Ryoko Kamimura holding her severely deformed daughter, Tomoko, in a Japanese bath chamber. Tomoko was poisoned by methylmercury while still in the womb. The photo was very widely published. It was posed by Smith with the co-operation of Ryoko and Tomoko to dramatically illustrate the consequences of the disease. It has subsequently been withdrawn from circulation at the request of Tomoko's family, so does not appear in recent anthologies of Smith's works. Smith and his wife were extremely dedicated to the cause of the people with Minamata disease, closely documenting their struggle for recognition and right to compensation. Smith was himself attacked and seriously injured by Chisso employees in an incident in Goi, Ichihara city, near Tokyo on January 7, 1972, in an attempt to stop him from further revealing the issue to the world. The 54-year-old Smith survived the attack, but his sight in one eye deteriorated and his health never fully recovered before his death in 1978. Johnny Depp plays W. Eugene Smith in Minamata (2020) a drama based on the book written by Smith's wife.

Japanese photographer Takeshi Ishikawa, who assisted Smith in Minamata, has since exhibited his own photographs documenting the disease. His photographs cover the years 1971 to the present, with Minamata victims as his subjects.

The prominent Japanese documentary filmmaker Noriaki Tsuchimoto made a series of films, starting with Minamata: The Victims and Their World (1971) and including The Shiranui Sea (1975), documenting the incident and siding with the victims in their struggle against Chisso and the government.

Kikujiro Fukushima, a well-known Japanese photographer and journalist, published a series of photographs in 1980 concerning pollution in Japan, including Minamata disease. Some negatives of these photos are available on the website, and Kyodo News Images holds the rights to them.

=== Today ===
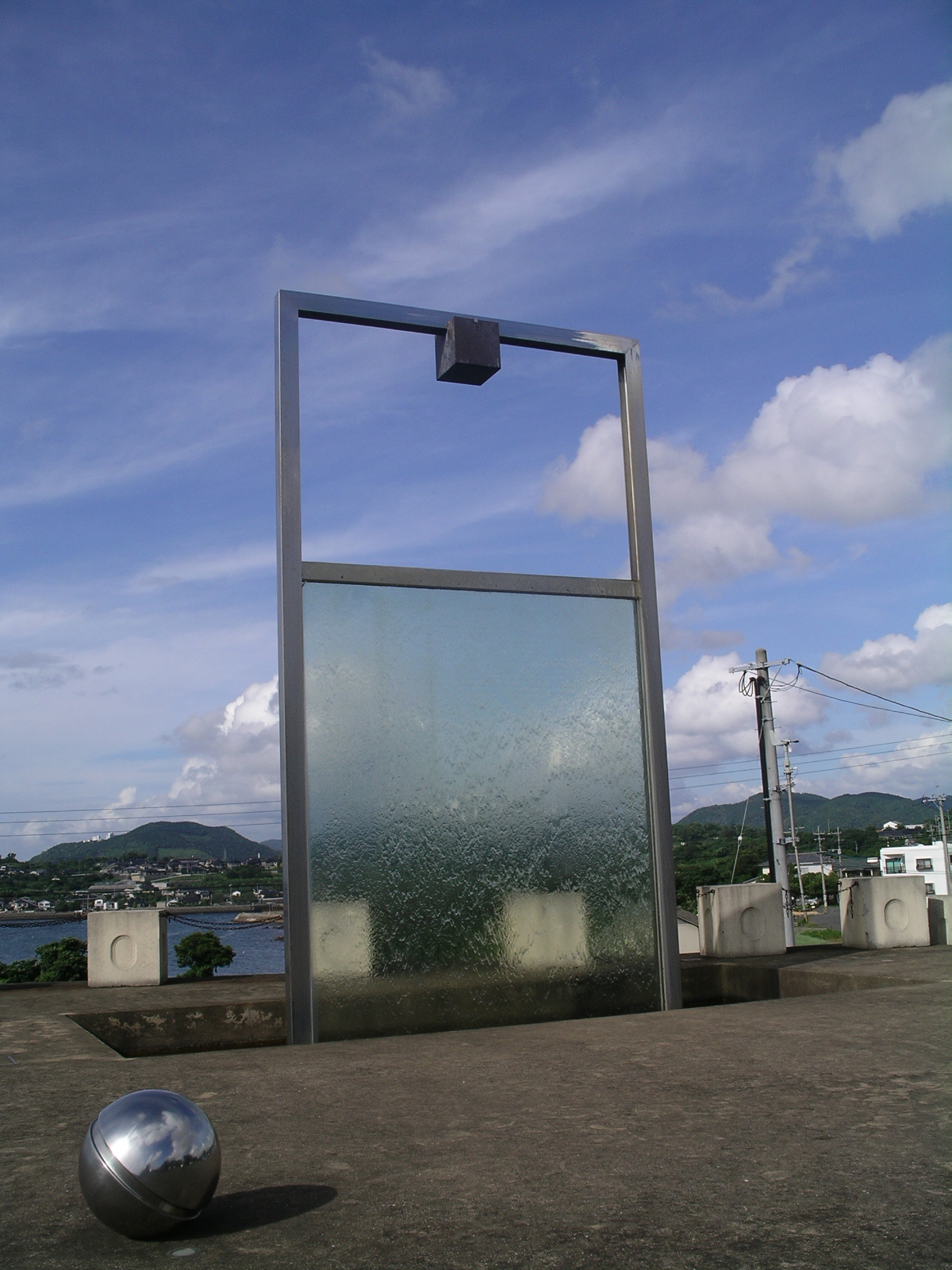
Memorial at the Minamata Disease Municipal Museum

Minamata disease remains an important issue in contemporary Japanese society. Lawsuits against Chisso and the prefectural and national governments are still continuing and many regard the government responses to date as inadequate. Chisso's 2004 Annual Report reports an equivalent of about US$50 million (5,820 million yen) in "Minamata Disease Compensation Liabilities". From 2000 to 2003, the company also reported total compensation liabilities of over US$170 million. Their 2000 accounts also show that the Japanese and Kumamoto prefectural governments waived an enormous US$560 million in related liabilities. Their FY2004 and FY2005 reports refer to Minamata disease as "mad hatter's disease", a term coined from the mercury poisoning experienced by hat-makers of the last few centuries (cf. Erethism).

A memorial service was held at the Minamata Disease Municipal Museum on 1 May 2006 to mark 50 years since the official discovery of the disease. Despite bad weather, the service was attended by over 600 people, including Chisso chairman Shunkichi Goto and Environment Minister Yuriko Koike.

On Monday, March 29, 2010, a group of 2,123 uncertified victims reached a settlement with the government of Japan, the Kumamoto Prefectural government, and Chisso Corporation to receive individual lump-sum payments of 2.1 million yen and monthly medical allowances.

Most congenital patients were in their forties and fifties for the first years of the new millennium, being in their sixties and seventies in the 2020s. Their health has been deteriorating for a long time. Their parents, who are often their only source of care, were either already deceased, or aged between 70 and 89 in the 2000s (90–109 as of the 2020s). Often, these patients find themselves tied to their own homes and the care of their family, effectively isolated from the local community. Some welfare facilities for patients do exist. One notable example is Hot House, a vocational training centre for congenital patients as well as other disabled people in the Minamata area. Hot House members are also involved in raising awareness of Minamata disease, often attending conferences and seminars as well as making regular visits to elementary schools throughout Kumamoto Prefecture.

== See also ==
- Heavy metal poisoning
- Minamata Convention on Mercury
- Ontario Minamata disease
- Mercury in fish
