= Tomoko and Mother in the Bath =

1971 photograph by W. Eugene Smith

Tomoko and Mother in the Bath is a photograph taken by American photojournalist W. Eugene Smith in 1971. Many commentators regard Tomoko as Smith's greatest work. The black-and-white photo depicts a mother cradling her severely deformed, naked daughter in a traditional Japanese bathroom. The mother, Ryoko Kamimura, agreed to deliberately pose the photograph with Smith to illustrate the effects of Minamata disease (a type of mercury poisoning) on the body and mind of her daughter Tomoko Kamimura. Upon publication the photo became world-famous, significantly raising the international profile of Minamata disease and the struggle of the victims for recognition and compensation. At the wishes of Tomoko Kamimura's family, the photograph was withdrawn from further publication in 1997, 20 years after Tomoko's death.

Although Tomoko's surname is "Kamimura", the photograph is commonly known as Tomoko Uemura in Her Bath. This stems from a misreading of the first kanji of the subject's surname Kamimura (上村). Other alternate names given for the photograph include Tomoko in Her Bath and Tomoko is Bathed by Her Mother.

== Capture ==
W. Eugene Smith and his wife Aileen Mioko Smith lived in Minamata from 1971 to 1973, with the specific aim of bringing Minamata disease to public attention. During those three years Smith took thousands of photographs, leading to the production of numerous magazine articles, exhibitions and a book. Smith realised that a single, striking photograph was required to become a symbol of Minamata disease. In Smith's own words, "It grew and grew in my mind that to me the symbol of Minamata was, finally, a picture of this woman [the mother], and the child, Tomoko. One day I simply said […] let us try to make that symbolic picture".

Tomoko's parents allowed Smith to photograph their daughter's body, in the hope that it might draw attention to the plight of similar families in Minamata and other pollution victims all over the world. Ryoko Kamimura was keen for the photograph to portray her daughter in a sympathetic manner and actively collaborated with Smith to stage the perfect shot. Jim Hughes, (a biographer) said of Smith, "Although he wanted a photograph that would clearly show Tomoko's deformed body, Gene told me it was Ryoko Uemura, the mother, who suggested the bathing chamber". The photograph was finally taken on a chilly afternoon in December 1971, with Ryoko, Tomoko, Smith and his wife Aileen all cramped into the small bathing room. It was taken with a Minolta SR-T 101 and super wide 16mm Rokkor lens.

== Publication and impact ==
The photograph was first published in the June 2, 1972, edition of Life magazine as the centrepiece of a short Minamata photo essay. This was expanded into book form featuring the full series of photographs taken by Smith during his stay in Minamata. The issue of Minamata disease and the plights of the victims was brought to worldwide attention by this photo essay and book. As well, Smith was attacked and beaten by yakuza hired by Chisso, the polluting corporation.

The striking nature of the photograph ensured that it became world-famous very quickly. The Kamimura family found themselves under a media spotlight. Tomoko's father, Yoshio Kamimura said, "We were faced with an increasing number of interviews. Thinking that it would aid the struggle for the eradication of pollution, we agreed to interviews and photographs while the organizations that were working on our behalf used the photograph of Tomoko frequently". However the increased attention was not without its drawbacks. Rumors began to circulate in the Minamata community that the Kamimuras were benefiting financially from the publicity. Some local people (who relied on the polluting Chisso Corporation for their livelihoods) were fiercely opposed to the Minamata disease victims' struggle for compensation. All these pressures added up significantly for the Kamimura family. "I do not think," Yoshio Kamimura stated, "that anybody outside our family can begin to imagine how unbearable the persistent rumors made our daily lives... Although she could not speak herself, I am sure that Tomoko felt that her family were worried for her".

Tomoko Kamimura died in 1977 at the age of 21.

== Withdrawal ==
In 1997, a French television production company contacted the Kamimura family, asking permission to use Smith's famous photograph in a documentary about the most important photographs of the 20th century, and to interview the family once again about Minamata disease and the photograph. However, by this stage, 20 years after his daughter's death, Yoshio Kamimura had changed his mind. He refused any interviews and disliked the idea of Tomoko's image being further exploited: "I wanted Tomoko to be laid to rest and this feeling was growing steadily", he said.

After W. Eugene Smith's death in 1978, the copyright of his Minamata photographs passed to his ex-wife Aileen Mioko Smith. Upon hearing the reaction of the Kamimura family to the request of the TV company, she travelled to Minamata and met with them. She decided to grant the copyright of the photograph to the family in 1998, so that they might have the right of decision regarding its use. Aileen M. Smith said, "This photograph would mean nothing if it did not honor Tomoko. This photograph would be a profanity if it continued to be issued against the will of Tomoko and her family. Because this was a statement about Tomoko's life, it must honor that life and by it her death."

== See also ==
- List of photographs considered the most important
