= Shitagau Noguchi =

Japanese entrepreneur

Noguchi Shitagau
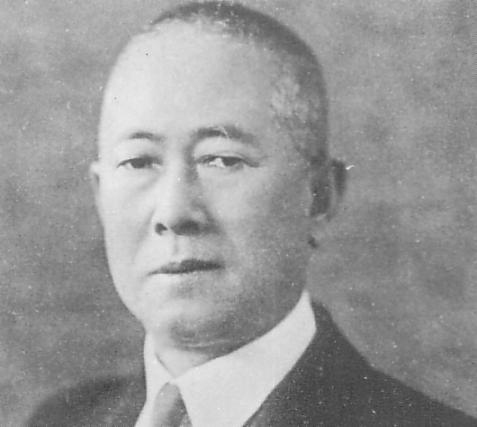
- Born: July 26, 1873; Kanazawa, Ishikawa, Japan
- Died: January 15, 1944 (aged 70)
- Education: Tokyo Imperial University
- Occupation: Entrepreneur
- Known for: Nichitsu zaibatsu

Shitagau Noguchi (野口 遵, Noguchi Shitagau; July 26, 1873-January 15, 1944) was a Japanese entrepreneur who founded the Nichitsu zaibatsu. Known as the father of electrochemical engineering in Japan, he invested heavily in the development of Korea and Manchukou in cooperation with the Imperial Japanese Army and Navy. His company was dissolved under the American occupation after World War II, and its successor companies include the Chisso Corporation, and portions of Asahi Kasei, Sekisui Chemical Company, and Shin-Etsu Chemical.

== Biography ==
Noguchi was born to a samurai class family in Kanazawa, Ishikawa Prefecture, Japan. He studied electrical engineering at the Tokyo Imperial University and was hired by Siemens in 1898. He designed Japan's first commercial production plant for Calcium carbide in Sendai in 1903. In 1906, two Germans, A.Frank and N. Caro, invented a new method to produce calcium cyanamide to be used a fertilizer. Noguchi learnt of this invention in a newspaper and realized that the method could be used to utilize the calcium carbide that his plant produced. He went to Germany, and with the support of an acquaintance at Siemens obtained the patent rights, beating other, larger and better-known Japanese trading firms like Mitsui and Furukawa.

In 1906, he formed the company Kiso Electric, to develop a hydroelectric power in Kagoshima prefecture under contract by local mine owners in Kyūshū. Since the capacity of the plant he built - 800 kW - was in excess of the demand, he established another company, Nippon Carbide Shokai, located in Minamata, Kumamoto, to produce calcium carbide with the surplus electricity in 1907.

With financial help from Mitsubishi, Noguchi merged his two companies into Nihon Chisso Hiryo (lit. "Japan Nitrogenous Fertilizer") in 1908. The name was frequently abbreviated to "Nichitsu". Then, with his collaborator, Fujiyama Tsuneichi, he developed a 'continuous method' of production to replace the 'alternate method' of Frank-Caro's technology. He also produced ammonium sulphate out of the calcium cyanamide, because it was safer and better known. In 1914, he formed "Hiroshima Electric", the forerunner of Chugoku Electric Power to develop the hydroelectric power potential of the Chugoku region of Japan.

In 1921 Noguchi bought a new technology for synthetic ammonia from an Italian, Luigi Casale. It was still at the stage of a tiny pilot plant when he purchased the license. Again, by their own effort, Nichitsu succeeded in developing a commercially viable plant and selling ammonium sulphate cheaper than the rivals could, thereby dominating the market. Nichitsu also diversified into the production of synthetic fiber and dynamite. In 1922 the German rayon manufacturer Vereinigte Glanzstoff-Fabriken (VGF) invested in a new Japanese firm in partnership with Noguchi and Asahi Chemicals. The technology was licensed under conditions that prevented competition in VGF's home market, and ensured that VGF would receive the rights to any technical advances made in Japan.

In 1926, with the collaboration of the Imperial Japanese Army, Noguchi established "Chosen Electric Power" and "Chosen Chisso Hiryo". The former developed Pujon and Chagjin branches of the Yalu River in northern Korea with a number of huge hydraulic power plants, which supplied a number of huge electrochemical plants, producing a diverse range of products, from fertilizer and explosives to soda and metals.

Noguchi suffered from an intracranial hemorrhage while at Seoul in 1940, and began to withdraw from active involvement in his conglomerate, which by 1941 had invested 659 million Yen, 66 percent of the fixed capital in the Nichitsu Group, in Korea. Within Korea, 34 percent of all the industrial production in 1939 was made by the Nichisu group. In 1941, Noguchi donated his personal fortune to The Korean Scholarship Foundation, dedicated to building schools, funding scholarships, and raising educational standards in Korea. In 1942, he was awarded the Order of the Sacred Treasures, 1st class. He died in 1944.

== Sources ==
- Donzé, Pierre-Yves; Nishimura, Shigehiro (2013-11-12). Organizing Global Technology Flows: Institutions, Actors, and Processes. Routledge. ISBN 978-1-135-01357-8.
- Odagiri, Hiroyuki (1996). Technology and Industrial Development in Japan. Oxford University Press. p. 79. ISBN 0-19-828802-6.
