= NIMD =

NIMD may refer to:

- Netherlands Institute for Multiparty Democracy
- National Institute for Minamata Disease (Japan)
