= Paul Sandifer =

British neurologist (1908–1964)

Paul Harmer Sandifer MRCS, LRCP, FRCP (25 April 1908 – 29 December 1964) was a British medical doctor. He is considered one of the early founders of paediatric neurology in Great Britain.

== Background ==
Sandifer was born in 1908 to Henry Stephen Sandifer, a general practitioner in Kensington, London, and Evelyn Lee. He attended Mill Hill School. Sandifer was a talented athlete; he was captain of the rugby team and named victor ludorum. He studied law for a brief period before deciding to change to medicine.

== Career ==
Sandifer trained at Middlesex Hospital medical school. After graduation, he worked at the hospital as house physician under renowned neurologist Douglas McAlpine, founder of UCL Great Ormond Street Institute of Child Health Alan Moncrieff, tuberculosis specialist R. A. Young, and George Ernest Beaumont. In 1935, Sandifer was appointed house physician to George Beaumont and Clifford Hoyle at Royal Brompton Hospital. In 1936, he returned to Middlesex Hospital to become a casualty medical officer. In 1937, he worked at the Maudsley Hospital and obtained a diploma in psychological medicine. Sandifer then became house physician and later senior resident medical officer at National Hospital for Neurology and Neurosurgery until the outbreak of World War II.

During World War II, Sandifer worked as a neurologist in Sector 5 of the Emergency Hospital Service. He later became a neuropsychiatrist at the rank of wing commander in the Royal Air Force. He continued to work for the RAF until 1951. In 1946, Sandifer became assistant physician at the Maida Vale Hospital for Nervous Diseases and the Royal National Orthopaedic Hospital. In 1948, he became a neurologist at Mount Vernon Hospital and Radium Institute. From 1948 until 1953 he served as neurologist to the Oxford Regional Hospital Board.

In 1953, Sandifer established the Department of Neurology at Great Ormond Street Hospital, becoming one of the first official paediatric neurologists in the United Kingdom.

== Sandifer syndrome ==
Sandifer syndrome was named in his honour by his former student, Marcel Kinsbourne.

== Personal life ==
In 1939 he married Sheila Anderson, an anaesthetist at Great Ormond Street Hospital. They had no children. Sandifer's interests outside medicine included travel, ballet, music, haute cuisine, gardening and fast cars.

== Death ==
Sandifer died in 1964.
