= R. A. Young =

R. A. Young in 1947

Sir Robert Arthur Young, CBE, FRCP (6 November 1871 – 22 August 1959), known as R. A. Young even to his friends, was a British physician and tuberculosis specialist.

== Early life and education ==
Robert Arthur Young was born in the village of Hilborough, Norfolk, the only son of William Young, a labourer, and his wife, Hannah Elizabeth Ann (née Fairs). His mother, at least, was illiterate and signed the registration of his birth with her mark.

He was educated at Westminster City School and King's College, London, graduating Bachelor of Science (BSc) in physiology with first-class honours in 1891.

== Career ==
Young trained as a doctor at Middlesex Hospital, graduating Bachelor of Medicine (MB) in 1894 and Doctor of Medicine (MD) with gold medal in 1895. He also became a Licentiate of the Society of Apothecaries. He was elected Member of the Royal College of Physicians (MRCP) in 1897 and Fellow of the Royal College of Physicians (FRCP) in 1905.

He carried out postgraduate work in Vienna, Austria, and then returned to London to work as a house physician at the Middlesex Hospital and Brompton Hospital, and also later at the King Edward VII Sanatorium near Midhurst, Sussex. His students at the Middlesex Hospital included renowned neurologist Paul Sandifer. Young established a private practice in Harley Street, continuing there long after his retirement from the Middlesex Hospital in 1936, which made him a very wealthy man. He advised on King George VI's lung cancer in 1951.

== Other activities ==
At various times he also served as lecturer in physiology and pharmacology, warden of the medical college, pathologist, and museum curator at the Middlesex Hospital.

Young chaired the National Association for the Prevention of Tuberculosis.

== Honours ==
He was appointed Commander of the Order of the British Empire (CBE) in January 1920 for his work in the First World War and was knighted in 1947.
