= Sandifer syndrome =

- Other names: Sandifer's syndrome
- Specialty: Pediatrics

Sandifer syndrome (or Sandifer's syndrome) is an eponymous paediatric medical disorder, characterised by gastrointestinal symptoms and associated neurological features. There is a significant correlation between the syndrome and gastro-oesophageal reflux disease (GORD); however, it is estimated to occur in less than 1% of children with reflux.

== Symptoms and signs ==
Onset is usually confined to infancy and early childhood, with peak prevalence at 18–36 months. In rare cases, particularly where the child is severely mentally impaired, onset may extend to adolescence.

The classical symptoms of the syndrome are spasmodic torticollis and dystonia. Nodding and rotation of the head, neck extension, gurgling, writhing movements of the limbs, and severe hypotonia have also been noted.

Spasms may last for 1–3 minutes and may occur up to 10 times a day. Ingestion of food is often associated with occurrence of symptoms; this may result in reluctance to feed. Associated symptoms, such as epigastric discomfort, vomiting (which may involve blood) and abnormal eye movements have been reported. Clinical signs may also include anaemia.

== Diagnosis ==
Diagnosis is made on the basis of the association of gastro-oesophageal reflux with the characteristic movement disorder. Neurological examination is usually normal. Misdiagnosis as benign infantile spasms or epileptic seizures is common, particularly where clear signs or symptoms of gastro-oesophageal reflux are not apparent. Early diagnosis is critical, as treatment is simple and leads to prompt resolution of the movement disorder.

== Treatment ==
Successful treatment of the associated underlying disorder, such as GORD or hiatus hernia, may provide relief.

== Prognosis ==
Sandifer syndrome is not typically life-threatening and the prognosis is typically good.

== History ==
Sandifer syndrome was first described in 1964 by Austrian neurologist Marcel Kinsbourne in The Lancet. Kinsbourne named the syndrome after his mentor, British neurologist Paul Sandifer, who had initially cared for the patients described in Kinsbourne's case reports.

== See also ==
- List of eponymously named diseases
