= Masazumi Harada =

Japanese doctor and medical researcher

Masazumi Harada (原田 正純, Harada Masazumi; September 14, 1934 – June 11, 2012) was a Japanese doctor and medical researcher. His most famous work covered the effects of Minamata disease, a type of severe mercury poisoning that occurred in the city of Minamata, Kumamoto Prefecture during the 1950s and 1960s. His publications included Minamata disease (水俣病, Minamata-byō) (1972) and Minamata Ga Utsusu Sekai (水俣が映す世界, Minamata Ga Utsusu Sekai) (1989). He died June 11, 2012, of acute myelocytic leukemia at his home in Kumamoto.

== Timeline ==
- 1934 Born in Kagoshima Prefecture, Japan
- 1959 Graduates from Kumamoto University medical department and goes on to study psychoneurology
- 1972 Minamata-byō is published
- 1989 Minamata Ga Utsusu Sekai is published
- 1994 Receives the Global 500 Prize from the United Nations Environment Program
- 1999 Retires from Kumamoto University and joins Kumamoto Gakuen University
- 2004 Minamata-byō is published in English as Minamata Disease
- 2012 Dies of leukemia

== Published works in English ==
- Harada, Masazumi. (1972). Minamata Disease. Kumamoto Nichinichi Shinbun Centre & Information Center/Iwanami Shoten Publishers. ISBN 4-87755-171-9 C3036
- Harada, Masazumi. (1995-01-01). "Minamata Disease: Methylmercury Poisoning in Japan Caused by Environmental Pollution". Critical Reviews in Toxicology. 25 (1): 1–24. doi:10.3109/10408449509089885. ISSN 1040-8444. PMID 7734058.

== See also ==
- Minamata disease
