= Minamata Bay =

Factory town in southwest Japan; site of a 1960s environmental disaster

Coordinates: 32.2073°N 130.3976°E

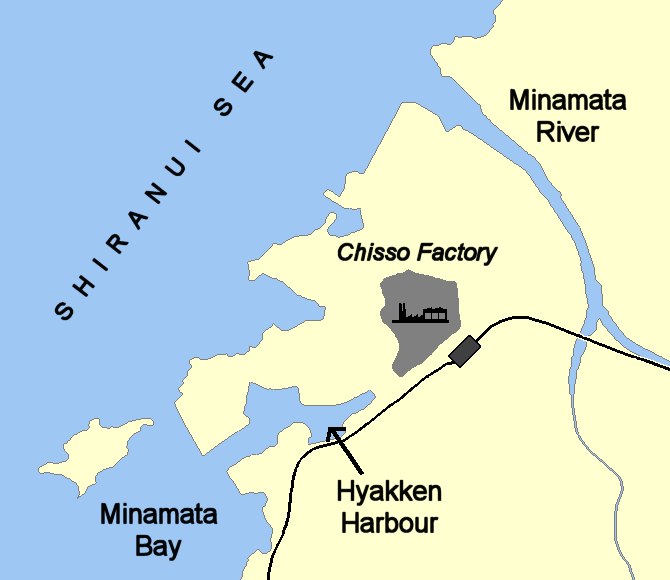
Map of Minamata Bay and the Chisso factory

Minamata Bay is a bay in the small factory town of Minamata on the west coast of Kyūshū island, located in Kumamoto Prefecture, Japan. The bay is part of the larger Shiranui Sea which is sandwiched between the coast of the Kyūshū mainland and the off-lying islands of Kumamoto and Nagasaki prefectures.

The coastline is rugged, with many inlets and coves which act as the spawning grounds of fish and shellfish. A great variety of creatures live in this area.

== Minamata disease ==
Minamata Bay was heavily polluted in the 1950s and 1960s by wastewater, mixed with mercury dumped into Hyakken Harbour from the Chisso Corporation's factory in Minamata, particularly by methylmercury. The highly toxic compound bioaccumulated in fish and shellfish in the bay which, when eaten by the people living around the bay, gave rise to Minamata disease. More than 10,000 people were affected.

A memorial service was held at the Minamata Disease Municipal Museum on 1 May 2006 to mark 50 years since the official discovery of the disease. Despite bad weather the service was attended by over 600 people, including Chisso chairman Shunkichi Goto and Environment Minister Yuriko Koike.

The poisoning of Minamata Bay had a large impact on Japanese culture as well. Hayao Miyazaki used this event as inspiration to create his epic manga Nausicaä of the Valley of the Wind and its anime adaptation. Toshiko Akiyoshi composed the jazz suite Minamata for big band, performed on her album Insights, divided into three parts, reflecting the transition of the village from a peaceful existence, to prosperity and consequence, and epilogue.
