= Douglas McAlpine =

British neurologist (1890–1981)

- Born: Archibald Douglas McAlpine; 19 August 1890; Garscadden, Glasgow
- Died: 4 February 1981 (aged 90)
- Occupation: Neurologist
- Known for: McAlpine's Multiple Sclerosis

Archibald Douglas McAlpine (19 August 1890 – 4 February 1981) was a British neurologist who pioneered research into multiple sclerosis. His book Multiple sclerosis, published first time in 1955, has since his death been published with the title McAlpine's Multiple Sclerosis, and has become the standard reference for multiple sclerosis researchers. Dr McAlpine was the first one to suggest mercury poisoning as the probable cause for the Minamata disease.

== Biography ==
McAlpine was born in Garscadden, Glasgow, on 19 August 1890, the only son and eldest of three children of civil engineering contractor Sir Robert McAlpine, 1st Baronet and his second wife Florence Margaret Palmer.

He graduated in 1913 with a Bachelor of Medicine, Bachelor of Surgery from Glasgow University. During World War I he served in the Royal Army Medical Corps and then as a Surgeon Lieutenant in the Royal Navy, where he was mentioned in dispatches. After taking his Doctor of Medicine (M.D.) in 1923 and working in junior hospital posts, he was appointed neurologist to the Middlesex Hospital in 1924. His students at Middlesex Hospital included renowned neurologist Paul Sandifer.

McAlpine served as a Brigadier in the Royal Army Medical Corps as an adviser in neurology to the South East Asia Command during World War II, and was mentioned in dispatches again.

In 1953, McAlpine was the leading light in the formation of the Multiple Sclerosis Society of Great Britain. His book Multiple Sclerosis (1955) was recognised as the authoritative study of the disorder and was revised and updated in subsequent editions.

In 1958, McAlpine was the first to suggest that the Minamata symptoms resembled those of organic mercury poisoning.

After retiring from the National Health Service, he worked for the World Health Organization on demyelinating disorders. He was member and fellow of Royal College of Physicians, London.

== Private life ==
McAlpine married Elizabeth Meg Sidebottom (d. 1941) in 1917. The marriage produced two children:

- Robert Douglas Christopher McAlpine (born 14 June 1919, d.2008), a diplomat and managing director of Baring Brothers, 1969–79.
- Florence Mary Scott (born 24 August 1922).

He secondly married Diana Christina Dunscombe Plummer (d. 1981), daughter of Bertram Plummer, on 3 July 1945. The marriage produced one child,

- Alastair Bertram McAlpine (born 23 Apr 1946).

== Works ==
- —; Nigel Dean Compston; Charles Edward Lumsden (1955). Multiple Sclerosis. E. & S. Livingstone.
- — (1965). Multiple Sclerosis: A Reappraisal by Douglas McAlpine. Livingstone.
- —; Charles Edward Lumsden; Ernest D. Acheson (1968). Multiple Sclerosis: A Reappraisal. Livingstone. ISBN 9780443008252.
- —; Ernest Donald Acheson; Charles Edward Lumsden (1972). Multiple Sclerosis: A Reappraisal [by] Douglas McAlpine, Charles E. Lumsden [and] E.D. Acheson. ISBN 978-0-443-00825-2.
