= Hajime Hosokawa =

Japanese physician (1901–1970)

Hajime Hosokawa (細川 一, Hosokawa Hajime; 23 September 1901 – 13 October 1970) was director of the company hospital attached to the Chisso Corporation's chemical factory in Minamata, Kumamoto prefecture, Japan. He was the first doctor to discover and treat patients of the massive outbreak of mercury poisoning that occurred in the town, which became known as Minamata disease.

== Timeline ==
- 23 September 1901, born in Mikame village, Nishiuwa-gun, Ehime prefecture.
- 1927 Graduates from Tokyo University medical department.
- 1936 Joins Japan Nitrogenous Fertilizer Company (日本窒素肥料, Nihon Chisso Hiryō) and is attached to the hospital of the Agochi factory (阿吾地工場) on the Korean peninsular.
- 1941 Appointed director of the Minamata factory hospital.
- 1941 Assumes a new post as a field surgeon in Burma.
- 1947 Demobilizes and returns to work at the Minmata factory hospital.
- 1950 The occupying forces order the dissolution of the zaibatsu, including the Japan Nitrogenous Fertilizer Company. A successor company, New Japan Nitrogenous Fertilizer Company (新日本窒素肥料株式会社, Shin Nihon Chisso Hiryō Kabushiki Kaisha) is founded.
- 1 May 1956 Reports the discovery of an "epidemic of an unknown disease of the central nervous system" to the Minamata local health office, marking the official discovery of Minamata disease.
- May 1957 Begins experimenting on cats in an effort to determine the cause of the disease. Factory wastewater is included in the cats' food.
- October 1959 "Cat 400" exhibits signs of mercury poisoning. Hosokawa is convinced the factory's wastewater is the cause of Minamata disease but under persuasion from the company, these results are not published.
- 1962 Retires from the company and returns home to Ehime prefecture
- 1970 Hospitalised with lung cancer. While hospitalised he is interrogated for a judicial proceeding regarding Minamata disease and testifies to the concealment of the experimental results of "Cat 400".
- 13 October 1970 Dies at the age of 69.
