= National Institute for Minamata Disease =

Japanese medical research facility

Coordinates: 32.2304°N 130.4039°E

Japan's National Institute for Minamata Disease (NIMD) is a medical research facility in Minamata, Kumamoto Prefecture, that focuses on Minamata disease. It is part of Japan's Ministry of the Environment
