= Yokkaichi asthma =

Lung disease caused by air pollution in Japan

Yokkaichi asthma (四日市ぜんそく, Yokkaichi zensoku) refers to cases of chronic obstructive pulmonary disease, chronic bronchitis, pulmonary emphysema, and bronchial asthma in humans and various environmental changes usually attributed to sulfur dioxide (SO_{2}) emissions which appeared as smog over the city of Yokkaichi in Mie Prefecture, Japan between 1960 and 1972, though other SO_{x} compounds have been proposed. The generally accepted source of the sulfur oxide pollution was the Yokkaichi Kombinato petrochemical processing facilities and refineries built in Yokkaichi between 1959 and 1972 which did not properly desulfurize the high sulfur content in its crude oil. Yokkaichi asthma is considered one of the Four Big Pollution Diseases of Japan and was the subject of Japan's first court case related to pollution.

== Industry background ==
In 1899, wealthy Yokkaichi landowner Inaba San'emon transformed Yokkaichi's wetlands into a port for textile exports. Ishihara Industries built an oil refinery in Yokkaichi's remaining marshes in 1937. In 1938, the imperial navy built another oil refinery in Yokkaichi that would later become a target for American air raid bombing during the Pacific War. The oil refineries and a majority of the city were destroyed in 1945. In 1955, the Ministry of International Trade and Industry began its policy to transition Japan's primary fossil fuel source from coal to petroleum, and oil refineries were once again opened in Yokkaichi. The oil used in Yokkaichi was primarily imported from the Middle East, which contained 2% sulfur in sulfur containing compounds, resulting in a white-colored smog developing over the city.

=== Petrochemical Complex No.1 ===
To accomplish the goal of the government-issued Petrochem Industry Program - Phase I from 1955, the Daichi Petrochemical Complex, a joint project of Showa Oil and Shell Oil Company, began construction in 1956 around the remnants of World War II naval fuel factories in south Yokkaichi Harbor which were destroyed by bombing before their operation began. The location was convenient because waste could easily be dumped into the ocean and Yokkaichi's port provided a means for easily shipping products. Daichi Petrochemical Complex, the first of its kind in Japan, contained an oil refinery, a petrochemical plant, ethylene plant, and a power station when it began operation in 1959. As demand increased, the operation expanded its workday so that production could continue twenty four hours a day.

=== Petrochemical Complex No.2 ===
In 1960, the government of Prime Minister Hayato Ikeda accelerated the growth of petrochemical production as part of its goal to double individual incomes of Japanese citizens over a 10-year period. The Petrochemical Industry Program - Phase II began as the Ministry of International Trade and Innovation (MITI) announced that a second complex was to be constructed on reclaimed land in northern Yokkaichi. During its trial run, the complex broke down and expelled odorous runoff that spurred many complaints by citizens and visitors. The second complex went online officially in 1963.

== Symptoms ==
Beginning shortly after the opening of the first complex in 1959, severe cases of chronic obstructive pulmonary disease, chronic bronchitis, pulmonary emphysema, and bronchial asthma rose quickly among the local inhabitants, particularly in the Isozu and Shiohama districts which were closest to the factories, and among males over 50. Other chronic symptoms included sore throat. Symptoms showed some relief when affected people left areas of high air pollution. By 1964, Isozu Village, which was most affected, had 2.5% of the population exhibiting symptoms. A 2008 study by researchers from the Mie University Graduate School of Medicine and the Hiroshima University Natural Science Center for Basic Research and Development indicated a 10- to 20-fold higher mortality rate as a result of COPD and asthma in the affected populations of Yokkaichi versus the general population of Mie Prefecture. Several people with asthma committed suicide, such as Kihira Usaburou, with some writing suicide notes attributing their deaths to the disease.

For one 40-year-old Yokkaichi patient with asthma reported in Respiratory Medicine Case Reports journal, symptoms showed relief when treated using a vibrating mesh nebulizer.

== Environmental effects ==
=== Marine life ===
The fishing industry is considered the first victim of Yokkaichi pollution. Fish caught in Ise Bay as far as five miles from the mouth of Suzuka River developed a bad taste and greasy smell in 1959. Fish sent to Tsukiji, Tokyo were returned to Ise due to complaints, causing local fishermen to petition the government for compensation for their unsaleable fish in 1960. Special Committee of Promotion Council for Ise Bay Industrial Waste Water Pollution Countermeasures was organized by the Mie Prefectural Government in response to the incident and attributed the foul smelling fish and oily water texture to mineral oil in waste water expelled into the bay by nearby petrochemical plants and oil refineries. In 1962 during a factory tour, factory officials interviewed by Research Committee on Pollution founding member Miyamato Ken'ichi maintained despite these findings that the foul smelling fish was due to a sunken ship in Ise bay.

=== Air quality ===
Soot and white smog from the petrochemical plants filled the skies of Yokkaichi, and were the main concern of complaints before Petrochemical Complex No. 2 was constructed in 1963. The air was said to have an offensive odor. Researchers in the Journal of Environmental Health found in 1985 that as air quality decreased, mortality rate for bronchial asthma and chronic bronchitis cases increased.

=== Soil quality ===
A study in 1975 from Mie University in Japan found a significant correlation between the number of Yokkaichi asthma patients and decrease in expected grain yield for May to September summer crops.

== Cause ==
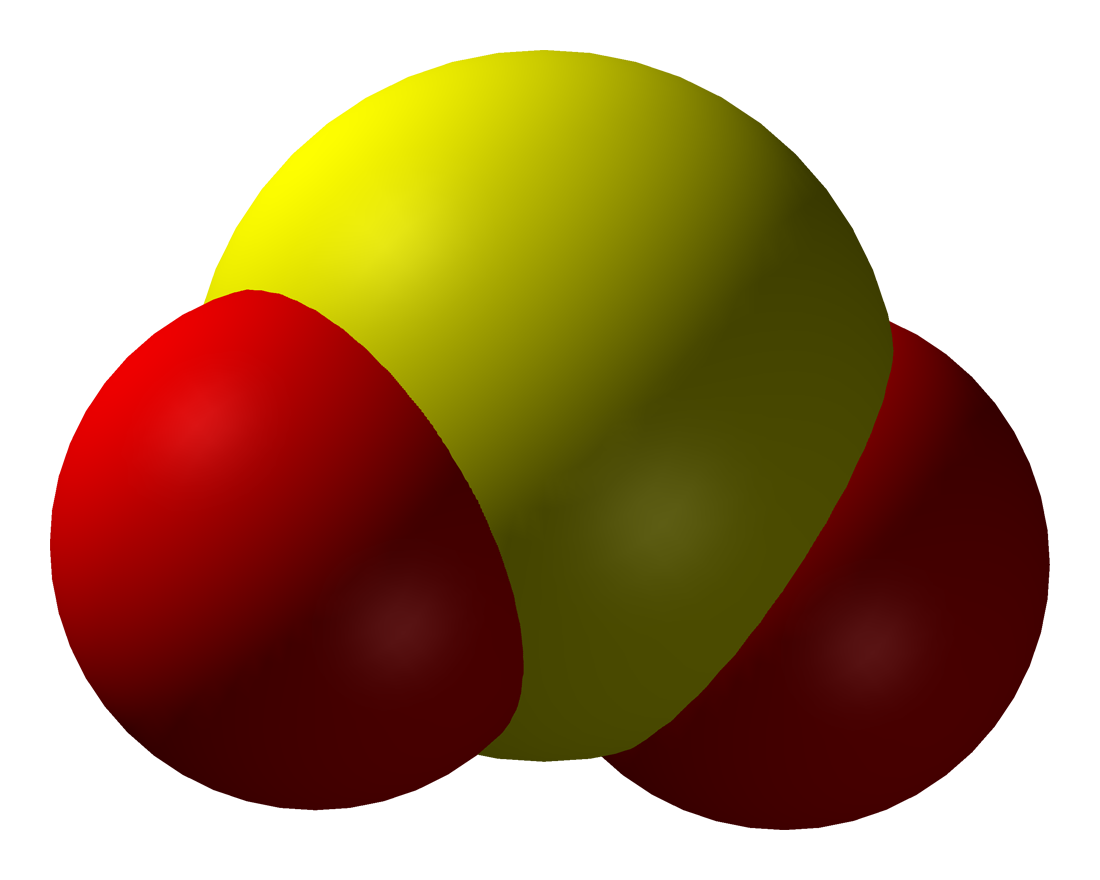

Sulfur dioxide, a toxic gas found in high concentrations in the air of Yokkaichi and initially believed to be the cause of the asthma cases

All clinical cases of Yokkaichi asthma began after the establishment of the oil refinery and petroleum chemical plants in 1959.

Complaints from citizens of offensive odors spurred investigation. Initially, the suspected sources of the odors included SO_{2}, hydrogen sulfide (H_{2}S), methylmercaptan, aldehydes, and other substances found to be leaking from the factories. However, sulfur dioxide emitted from the combustion of high sulfur content oil has typically been attributed as the cause of the disease since the beginning.

Despite common belief that SO_{2} was the main source of the asthma, by investigating sulfur dioxide and sulfur trioxide levels in Yokkaichi and analyzing compound toxicity levels, a study conducted in 1984 from Yokohama National University concluded that respiratory diseases were not a result of sulfur dioxide, but rather due to a titanium oxide manufacturing plant venting concentrated sulfuric acid mists downwind onto populated urban areas. The high concentration of Yokkaichi asthma patients in Isozu Village can be further accounted for under this conclusion, as the source of sulfur trioxide emissions is 2 kilometers south of the most affected population. A 2001 study by several researchers in the Environmental Management journal confirmed by analyzing the effects of SO_{2} and SO_{3} on humans that SO_{3} was likely the real cause of the asthma. They further propose that one of the reasons flue-gas desulfurization implementation did not lead to the disappearance of all cases was due to differences in SO_{2} and SO_{3} cleanup.

== Legal action ==
In 1960, those living in Isozu complained to Yokkaichi officials about noise from the factories and sickness caused by the chemicals, but they were ignored. Children were advised by teachers in Mihana Primary School to avoid breathing as much as possible. When the fishing industries in Yokkaichi began to collapse in spring 1960, the government finally issued a 100 million yen settlement that was to be divided up and distributed by Yokkaichi fishing unions. This settlement did nothing about the source of pollution. In August 1960, The Yokkaichi City Environmental Pollution Control Measures Committee was organized by the city of Yokkaichi prompted by further citizen complaints. The committee found that the Isozu district had six times the SO_{2} content in air of the rest of Yokkaichi and concluded that the asthma would likely cause an increase in mortality rate. They found that children were affected the most, and that about half of the children in Isozu district had the disease.

When the pollution did not stop, angry fishermen from Isozu upset with the government's lack of action attempted to plug an industrial drainpipe belonging to Mie electric company with sandbags. To prevent the fishermen from doing so, the company increased emissions and a fight broke out between those working for the company and the fishermen that had to be defused by local officials. This incident led to investigations in Yokkaichi by the national government.

The national government sent out investigators with the issue of the Special Survey Council on Yokkaichi Area Air Pollution in 1963, and they concluded their report in March 1964. Meanwhile, the government offered more compensation to fishermen following findings in 1965. Through the survey council's investigation Yokkaichi became an official target area of the 1968 Soot and Smoke Regulation Law. However, SO_{2} air pollution did not decrease, most notable through the suicide of confection shop owner Outani Kazuhiko, who wrote a note blaming the bad air for his death. Through this law, taller smokestacks were built, but they simply spread the pollution over a wider area and did not help alleviate the health issues. In 1965, the local government offered more compensation to fishermen following Special Survey Council on Yokkaichi Area Air Pollution findings in what would become the world's first public-relief system for pollution victims. For the first year, this was financed by the local government, but was financed by the national government's treasury in its second year.

Isozu district Yokkaichi residents with asthma filed a civil suit against companies with ties to Showa Yokkaichi Oil's Petrochemical Complex No. 1 in 1967 which would go on to become Japan's first court trial related to pollution. The trial ended in 1972 in favor of the plaintiffs, ruling that the company had committed negligence. After the trial, the local Yokkaichi government requested that the city be considered a target area for the 1968 Soot and Smoke Regulation Law. The 1968 Air Pollution Control Law led to the implementation of a flue-gas desulfurization processes for all emissions, which gradually led to health improvement in the local populace.

== Other cases ==
Yokkaichi asthma has been identified in other rapidly industrializing areas in parts of the world, including Mexico City, Singapore, and cities in mainland China like Guangzhou where air pollution caused by smog can lead to chronic asthma. Sulfur oxides have also been attributed to causing other Japanese city asthma outbreaks, such as in the Nishiyodogawa industrial district of Osaka, Japan.
