= Chisso =

Japanese chemicals company

Chisso Corporation
- Industry: Chemical
- Predecessor: Sogi Electric Company
- Founded: 1906 in Ōkuchi, Kagoshima Prefecture, Japan
- Founder: Shitagau Noguchi
- Headquarters: Japan
- Products: Liquid crystal
- Owner: Mizuho Bank (4.90%)
- Website: www.chisso.co.jp

The Chisso Corporation (チッソ株式会社, Chisso kabushiki kaisha), since 2012 reorganized as JNC (Japan New Chisso), is a Japanese chemical company. It is an important supplier of liquid crystal used for LCDs, but is best known for its role in the 34-year-long pollution of the water supply in Minamata, Japan, which caused Minamata disease—a devastating neurological condition that has led to thousands of victims of the disease dying, becoming disabled or exhibiting signs of mercury poisoning.

Between 1932 and 1968, Chisso's chemical factory in Minamata released large quantities of industrial wastewater that was contaminated with highly toxic methylmercury. This poisonous water bioaccumulated in local sea life that was then consumed by the immediate population. As a result of this contamination, 2,265 individuals in the area were afflicted with what is now known as Minamata disease. 1,784 of those victims died as a result of the poisoning and/or the disease. Those who were afflicted with the disease developed skeletomuscular deformities and lost the ability to perform motor functions such as walking. Many also lost significant amounts of vision, as well as hearing and speech capabilities. Severe cases presented with insanity, paralysis, coma and then death within weeks of the onset of symptoms.

As of March 2001, over 10,000 individuals had received financial remuneration from Chisso to compensate them for the harm caused by the chemical release. By 2004, Chisso Corporation had paid $86 million in compensation, and, in the same year, the company was ordered to clean up its contamination. However, the incident remains controversial for not only the poisoning itself but also for the tactics that the company used to suppress the negative aftermath.

Chisso is a member of the Mizuho keiretsu.

== History ==
=== Foundation ===
In 1906, Shitagau Noguchi, an electrical engineering graduate of Tokyo Imperial University, founded the Sogi Electric Company (曾木電気株式会社, Sogi Denki Kabushiki Kaisha) which operated a hydroelectric power station in Ōkuchi, Kagoshima Prefecture. The power station supplied electricity for the gold mines in Ōkuchi but had overcapacity. To make use of the surplus power, in 1908, Noguchi founded the Japan Carbide Company (日本カーバイド商会, Nihon Kaabaido Shōkai) which operated a carbide factory in the coastal town of Minamata, Kumamoto Prefecture, about 30 km northwest of Ōkuchi. In the same year he merged the two companies to form the Japan Nitrogenous Fertilizer Company (日本窒素肥料株式会社, Nihon Chisso Hiryō Kabushiki Kaisha) - usually referred to as Nichitsu.

=== Expansion ===
In 1909, Noguchi purchased the rights to the Frank-Caro process, whereby atmospheric nitrogen was combined with calcium carbide (a key product of the young company) to produce calcium cyanamide, a chemical fertilizer. Nitrogenous fertilizers were key to boosting agricultural production in Japan at the time, due to its lack of arable land and the small-scale nature of its farms, so the company found a ready market for its product. Nichitsu also branched out into other products produced from calcium carbide, beginning production of acetic acid, ammonia, explosives and butanol.

Production of ammonium sulfate (another chemical fertilizer) started in 1914 at a plant in Kagami, Kumamoto Prefecture, using a nitrogen fixation process - a Japan first. Sales of ammonium sulfate were increasing year-on-year as were market prices. A new plant was opened at the Minamata factory in 1918 where it was able to produce ammonium sulfate for 70 yen per ton and sell it for five and a half times the cost. These massive profits enabled Nichitsu to survive the subsequent drop in prices after the return of foreign competition into the Japanese market after the end of World War I in Europe in September 1918.

After the war, Noguchi visited Europe and decided Nichitsu should pioneer an alternative synthesis of ammonium sulfate in Japan. In 1924, the Nichitsu plant at Nobeoka began production using the Casale ammonia synthesis which required the use of extremely high temperatures and pressures. Once the process was proved a success, the Minamata plant was converted to the process and began mass production.

Nichitsu grew steadily, invested its profits in new technology and expanded production into new areas and slowly became a large conglomerate of many different companies.

=== Nichitsu in Korea ===
In 1924, Shitagau Noguchi expanded Nichitsu into Korea, a colony of Japan.

In 1926, he established two companies in Korea as subsidiaries of Nichitsu, mirroring the foundation of the parent company: Korea Hydroelectric Power Company (朝鮮水力電気株式会社, Chōsen Suiryoku Denki Kabushiki Kaisha) and Korea Nitrogenous Fertilizer Company (朝鮮窒素肥料株式会社, Chōsen Chisso Hiryō Kabushiki Kaisha). Noguchi wanted to repeat his success in Ōkuchi and Minamata, but on an even greater scale in Korea.

The power company constructed hydroelectric power plants along rivers draining into the Yalu River. In 1927, the fertilizer subsidiary built a huge chemical complex in Hungnam. The hydroelectric power plants supplied electricity for the chemical plant, in the same way as the Ōkuchi power plant had done so for the Minamata chemical factory.

Nichitsu invested in Korea more aggressively than any other Japanese company. It and its subsidiaries grew rapidly in Korea, and came to be recognized as an emerging zaibatsu.

The difference between Nichitsu's zaibatsu and established zaibatsu like Mitsubishi and Mitsui was that Nichitsu did not have its own bank and insurance company. Hence, Nichitsu relied on government-controlled banks.

=== Dissolution and reorganization ===
As Japan lost the Second World War in 1945, Nichitsu and its zaibatsu collapsed and was forced to abandon all properties and interests in Korea. Furthermore, the US-controlled Allied occupation of Japan ordered the dismissal of the company, regarding it as a company that adhered to the militarism government.

In 1950, the New Japan Nitrogenous Fertilizer Company (新日本窒素肥料株式会社, Shin Nihon Chisso Hiryō Kabushiki Kaisha), usually referred to as Shin Nichitsu, was founded as a successor of the old company. Other successor companies include Asahi Kasei and Sekisui Chemical.

=== Minamata disease ===
Nichitsu had started production of acetaldehyde using a mercury catalyst at its Minamata plant in May 1932, and Shin Nichitsu continued production after the war. The plant discharged wastewater from its acetaldehyde plant into Minamata Bay via Hyakken Harbour. The wastewater contained many pollutants and poisonous substances including methylmercury, a highly toxic chemical.

This chemical was absorbed by fish and shellfish and bioaccumulated up the food chain. People who unknowingly ate the fish over many years suffered from severe mercury poisoning. Hajime Hosokawa, a doctor at a Shin Nichitsu's company hospital, officially reported on May 1, 1956 an "epidemic of an unknown disease of the central nervous system", marking the official discovery of Minamata disease.

In 1963, doctors at Kumamoto University concluded that the cause of Minamata disease was mercury emitted by Shin Nihon Chisso Hiryo. In 1965, the company changed its name to Chisso Corporation (チッソ株式会社, Chisso Kabushiki Kaisha). In May 1968, Chisso finally stopped using a mercury catalyst in the production of acetaldehyde. In 1969, patients sued Chisso for compensation. Many lawsuits were filed against Chisso after 1969, and some of them go on even now.

Chisso president, later chairman Yutaka Egashira (later maternal grandfather of Masako, Empress of Japan) used yakuza in order to threaten and silence patients and their supporters. Patients and their supporters started the "single shareholder" movement by buying one share of Chisso each, which was aimed at accusing the executives of Chisso in its general meeting. A thousand of the single shareholders participating in the movement gathered in front of a hall in Osaka to attend the general meeting called on November 28, 1970, but the company prevented them from entering the hall by asking yakuza to become shareholders and occupy the hall. The meeting ended in five minutes with all the bills submitted by the board approved.

In addition, Chisso had American photographer and photo-journalist W. Eugene Smith beaten by yakuza goons after Smith published a highly regarded photo-essay showing the caustic injuries and birth defects Chisso had caused the Minamata population. The centerpiece of the work, titled "Tomoko and Mother in the Bath", depicted the severe deformation of a child in her mother's arms after the child was exposed to the effects of Chisso's contamination of the water supply in the womb. In response to Chisso's beating of W. Eugene Smith for dissemination of the photographs, Smith was awarded the Robert Capa Gold Medal in 1974 for "best published photographic reporting from abroad requiring exceptional courage and enterprise".

The company's "historical overview" in its current website makes no mention of their role in the mass contamination of Minamata and the dreadful aftermath, although a separate section of the website, accessed from the same list as the overview, is devoted to the subject. This section, however, is absent from the English version of the website. Additionally, their 2004 Annual Report reports an equivalent of about US$50 million (5.82 billion yen) in "Minamata Disease Compensation Liabilities". From 2000 to 2003, the company also reported total compensation liabilities of over US$170 million. Their 2000 accounts also show that the Japanese and Kumamoto prefectural governments waived an enormous US$560 million in related liabilities. Their FY2004 and FY2005 reports refer to Minamata disease as "Mad Hatter's Disease", a term coined from the mercury poisoning experienced by hat-makers of the last few centuries (cf Mad Hatter).

==== Animal experimentation ====
After initial reports of Minamata disease emerged, Chisso secretly conducted animal experiments in the '50s, exposing effluent to cats by mixing it in with their food. Despite Hosokawa's discoveries and public disclosures in 1959 the company did not release their experimental findings and continued to release effluent. The shack used during the animal experimentation was later obtained by The Supporting Center for Minamata Disease(Soshisha) in 1974 and is on display at the Minamata Disease Museum in Kumamoto Prefecture.

== See also ==
- LCD
- Liquid crystal
- Minamata disease
- Four big pollution diseases of Japan
- Minamata, Kumamoto
- Industrial waste
- Chemical waste
- Zaibatsu
