= Minamata =

Minamata 水俣市
- City
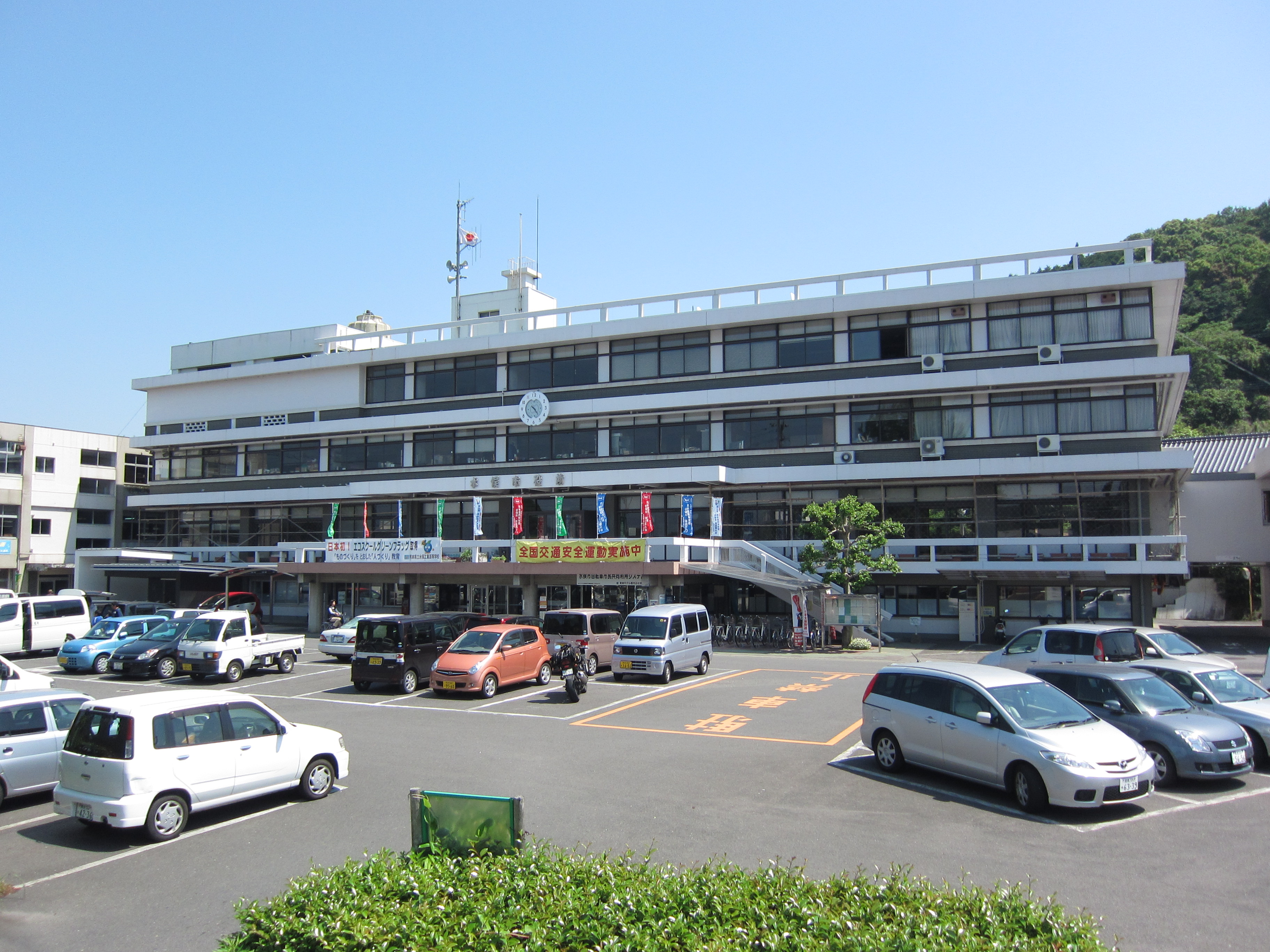
- Minamata City Hall

- Flag Emblem

- Location of Minamata in Kumamoto Prefecture

- Location in Japan
- Coordinates: 32°13′N 130°24′E
- Country: Japan
- Region: Kyūshū
- Prefecture: Kumamoto

Government
  - Mayor: Toshiharu Takaoka

Area
  - Total: 162.88 km^{2} (62.89 sq mi)

Population (October 1, 2020)
  - Total: 23,580
  - Density: 144.4/km^{2} (374/sq mi)
- Time zone: UTC+09:00 (JST)
- Postal code: 867-8555
- Phone number: 0966-63-1111
- Address: 1-1-1 Jinnai, Minamata-shi, Kumamoto-ken
- Climate: Cfa
- Website: Official website
- Symbols
- Flower: Rhododendron
- Tree: Sakura

Minamata (水俣市, Minamata-shi) is a city located in Kumamoto Prefecture, Japan. It is on the west coast of Kyūshū and faces Amakusa islands. Minamata was established as a village in 1889, re-designated as a town in 1912 and grew into a city in 1949. As of March 2017, the city has an estimated population of 25,310 and a population density of 160 persons per km^{2}. The total area is 162.88 km^{2}.

Minamata is known due to Minamata disease, a neurological disorder caused by mercury poisoning. The disease was discovered in 1956. A local chemical plant was blamed for causing the disease by emitting untreated wastewater into Minamata Bay.

Lately, Minamata has focused on becoming a model environmental city. In 1999, the city obtained the ISO 14001 certification for Environmental Management. In 2001, Minamata became an official Japanese Eco-town. In 2004 and 2005, Minamata won the Japanese Top Eco-City contest.

== Minamata environmental disaster ==
=== History ===
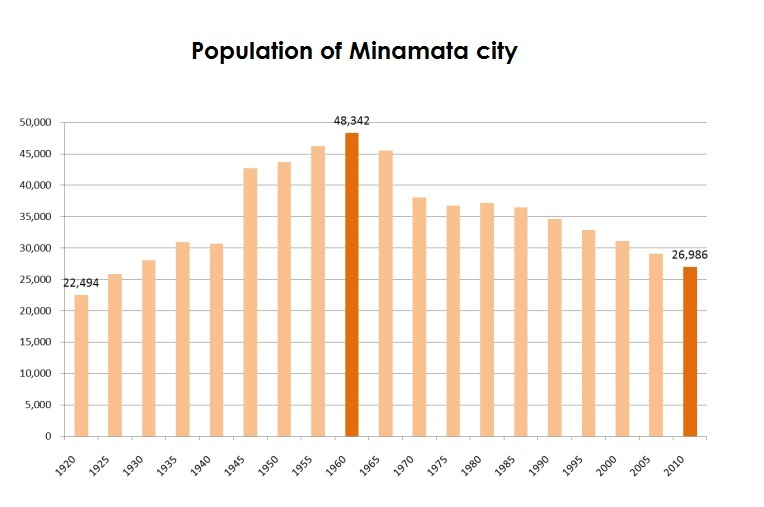
Evolution of population of Minamata 1920- 2010

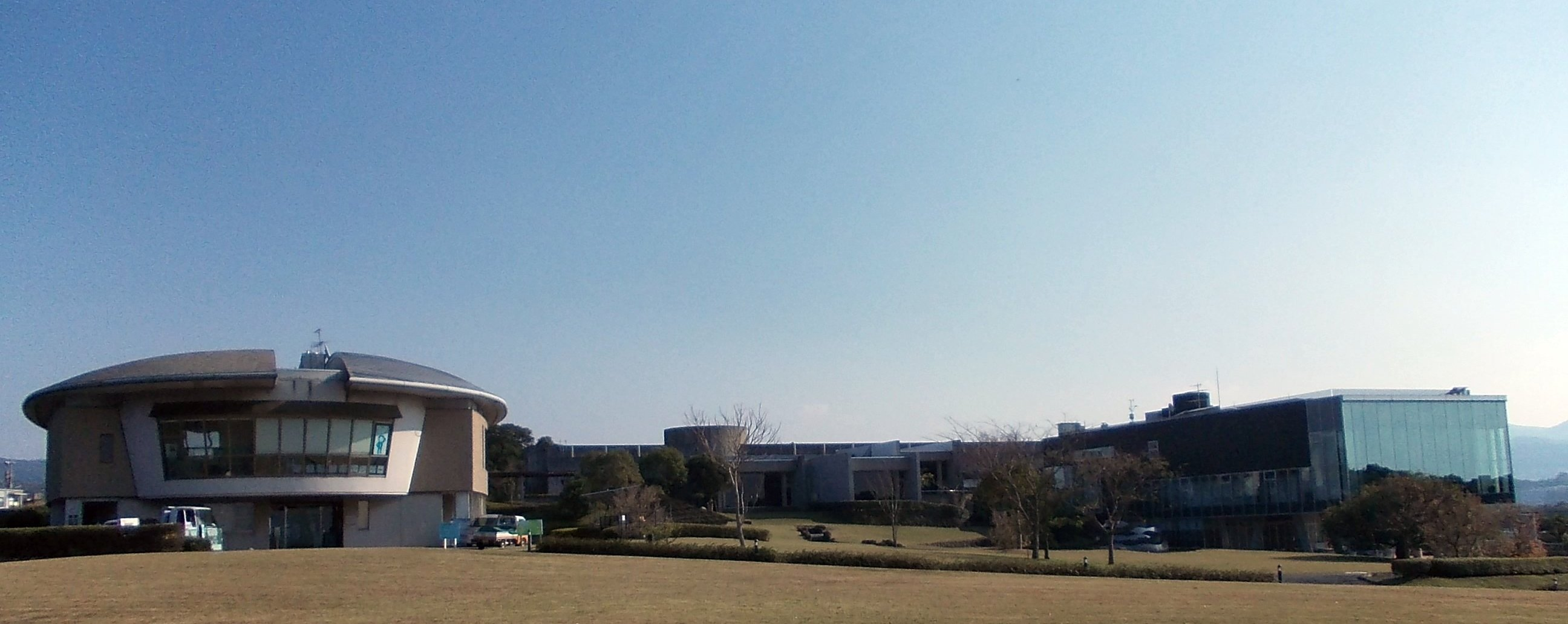
Minamata Disease Municipal Museum

The city is best known as the former site of an environmental disaster caused by industrial pollution of the bay with mercury. From 1932 to 1968, the chemical company Chisso discharged effluent containing methyl mercury from their plant in Minamata. Methyl mercury contaminated Minamata Bay and accumulated in fish, which were then consumed by the local population.

In 1968 the discharge of poisonous effluent was ceased due to discontinuation of acetaldehyde production at the Chisso factory. However, the sea sediment as well as fish remained contaminated and so measures were taken to counteract the effects. In 1975, the bay was fenced by fishing nets. A sludge dredging project was initiated in 1977 and continued until 1990. During the project, 784,000m^{3} of sludge was dredged and 582,000 m^{2} of land was reclaimed. On July 29, 1997, a Minamata Bay Safety Declaration was issued, nets had been removed and the environment was pronounced safe.

By 2007, a total of 2,668 people were certified as Minamata disease patients, 639 of whom are alive today. Since the Minamata mercury contamination event, the toxic burden of anthropogenic mercury (Hg) pollution for human and ecosystem health is globally accepted by policymakers and resulted in the UNEP Minamata Convention.

=== Legacy ===
The first patient with previously unseen neurological symptoms was reported in Minamata in 1956. In 1959, a researcher from Kumamoto University suspected that an organomercury compound could be the cause. However, paths of transformation of inorganic to organic mercury were unknown or uncertain at that time and so the effluent from Chisso was not identified as the sought source. It took 9 more years until the government officially acknowledged mercury-containing effluent from local acetaldehyde chemical plants to be the cause of Minamata disease. Since then, victims of Minamata disease have been compensated by Chisso and both local and national governments, due to the lawsuits won and official relief programs.

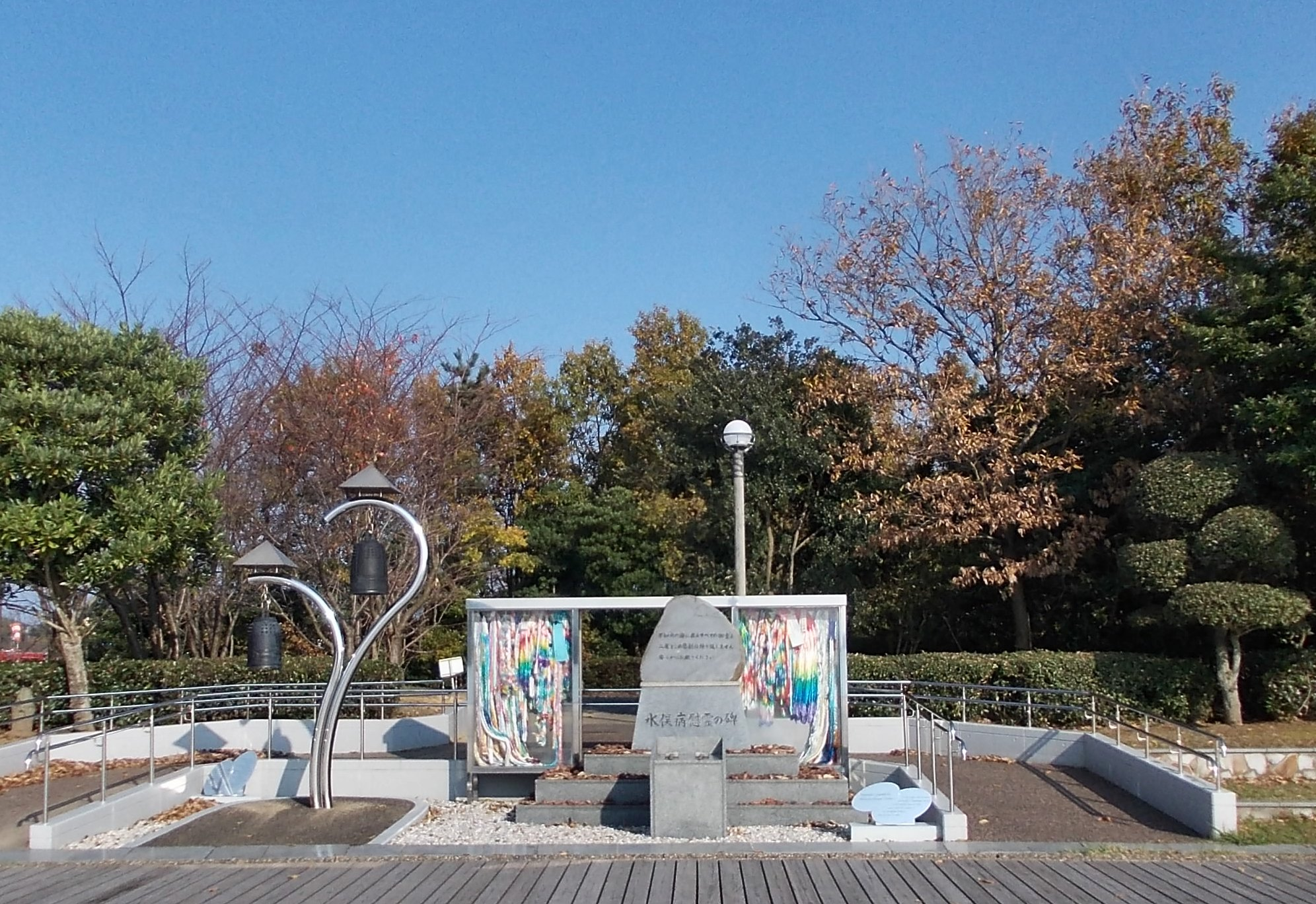
Minamata disease memorial monument located in the Seaside Park Eco Park of Minamata, Kumamoto Prefecture

The 1970 session of the Japanese Diet became remembered as the "Pollution Diet," as the Japanese government took action under the pressure of civil society movements provoked by Minamata disease as well as other two major environmental catastrophes - Yokkaichi Asthma and Itai-itai disease. Fourteen new environmental laws were passed in a single session, giving Japan what at the time were the most stringent environmental protection laws in the world. These new laws included a Water Pollution Act and nationwide regulations of toxic discharges. The polluter pays principle was introduced. A national Environmental Agency, which later developed into the Ministry of Environment, was founded in 1971. National governmental expenditures on environmental issues almost doubled between 1970 and 1975 and tripled on the local government level. Business investments in clean technologies rose dramatically, too.

Minamata disease attracted global attention in 1972 during the United Nations Conference on the Human Environment held in Stockholm. The official report presented to the Conference by the Japanese government did not mention the disease at all; this lack of honesty resulted in a second report being put together by Japanese citizens. Minamata disease patients were sent to Stockholm to hand in the citizens' report. Evidence of the misery caused by heavy environmental pollution revealed the downside of Japan's post-war rapid economic development to the global public.

In 1978, the National Institute for Minamata Disease was established in Minamata. It consists of four departments: The Department of Basic Medical Science, The Department of Clinical Medicine, The Department of Epidemiology and The Department of International Affairs and Environmental Sciences. In 1986, The Institute became a WHO Collaborating Centre for Studies on the Health Effects of Mercury Compounds. The Institute seeks to improve medical treatment of Minamata disease patients and conducts research on mercury compounds and their impact on organisms as well as potential detoxification mechanisms. In April, 2008 the Institute invented a method for adsorbing gaseous mercury in order to prevent air pollution and enable recycling of the metal. For an overview of research in 2012, see website list of research

Despite the fact that anti-pollution measures and patient-support programmes started in the 1970s, it took four more decades for the Government to fully admit responsibility and apologize on-site; on 1 May 2010 Prime Minister Hatoyama was the first Prime Minister to participate in a yearly-held Memorial Service for the Victims of Minamata Disease and to so demonstrate regret on behalf of the national government.

== Minamata Eco-Town ==
Minamata Eco-Town constitutes a set of environmental goals and initiatives, which seek to turn the town's negative legacy into a positive present and future. The idea dates back to 1992. In that year, the municipal government of Minamata announced "Moyai Naoshi" (meaning "Repairing social bonds") - a policy to amend relations between victims of the Minamata Disease and the other citizens and to give an end to prevailing social divisions. On 1 April 1992 the first Memorial Service for the Victims of Minamata Disease was organized and has taken place annually ever since. Moreover, the Minamata Disease Municipal Museum was founded in January 1993 in order to collect, preserve and pass on information about the disease and related issues. Apart from exhibitions, the Museum offers story-telling sessions by Minamata disease patients. Additional Minamata Disease archives were opened in 2001.

In respect of envisaged sustainable development, the municipal government addressed environmental challenges along the social ones; A Declaration of the Construction of Eco-City Model was launched in 1992. Subsequently, waste separation by citizens became one of the key activities; today, 24 different kinds of waste are separated. A Prize for the Environment was established to promote sustainability across Japan and South-East Asia and a prefectural environmental centre was built in Minamata.

Other major events and achievements:

- In 1996, an International Environment Forum was held in Minamata Cultural Hall. The topic was "Creating a city that is kind to the environment"
- In 1997, Minamata Bay Safety Declaration was issued and no more restrictions on fishing or consuming fish were valid
- In 1999, Minamata City Hall was certified with ISO 14001, so was the local chemical plant of Chisso
- In 2001, Minamata became an officially recognized Japanese Eco-Town
- In 2008, Kumamoto Toa IWD, after years of protests and civil resistance, withdrew a plan to build a landfill for industrial waste in the mountains near Minamata City

Currently, Minamata employs a plan of reducing greenhouse gases by 32% in 2020 and by 50% in 2050 compared to 2005. Four major target areas are designated to achieve these reductions: Activities for Environmentally Friendly Living, Development of Environmentally Friendly Industries, Development of a Nature-oriented Ecological Town, Development of The City for Environmental Learning.

=== Activities for environmentally friendly living ===
This target area has three main goals:

- Promotion of the reduction, separation and recycling of household garbage
- Promotion of ISO throughout the city
- Eco-Shop Certification system (Environmental Master Certification)

==== Garbage collection ====
Since August 1993, in order to promote recyclable household garbage through sorting, the residents of Minamata City have planned (before any other city in Japan) a detailed garbage classification system; garbage was divided into 21 categories in the fiscal year 1999, and has now reached 24 categories. The City has set up 300 garbage collection stations around the City. Each area's assigned recycling volunteers take turn in groups of two or three to assist the residents who bring in garbage for sorting out recyclable materials by themselves. Once a month the residents work together to classify garbage, an activity which revives the community spirit, and creates a place for residents to get together. Profits from the sale of recyclable garbage are distributed to each district according to the weight of each district's recyclable garbage; large districts receive up to 600,000 yen a year and smaller districts about 70,000-80,000 yen. Besides classification, the Recycling Volunteers Committee promotes Taking-Back-Home- Garbage Campaign, Recycling Campaign, and organizes recycling fairs such as flea markets where reusable goods are sold.

==== Women's Liaison Meeting for Reducing Waste ====
Because of its effort to classify garbage, Minamata City has successfully reduced its waste output significantly, from 10,000 tons in 1992 to 8,000 tons in 1994. However, it has become necessary to move beyond garbage classification to garbage reduction due to increasing garbage generation. As a result, in December 1997, 16 women's groups, which have great interest in waste reduction, met together and organized the "Women's Liaison Conference on Waste Garbage" with the slogan of "Let's reduce the increasing garbage from each household!" They actively encourage residents not to bring home items that are not absolutely required which may result in waste, to repair broken items and to buy recycled products when possible. Major activities of "Women's Liaison Meeting for Reducing Waste" are:

- Concluded "Agreement on Abolition of Plastic Food Trays" with four large retailers in the city. Plastic food trays were prohibited in the sale of 65 items (September 1998). Sales activities have been monitored on a regular basis since then.
- Engaged in the distribution of free "shopping bags" to households to reduce the use of plastic bags offered at cash registers (November to December 1998).
- Prompted one of the large retailers to introduce a point-card system for clients coming with their own shopping bags.
- Supported the establishment of the Eco-Shop Certification System and engaged in examination (since April 1999).
- Engaged in family ISO certification examination (since October 1999)

==== Promoting ISO ====
The municipal office of Minamata City obtained ISO 14001, international standard for environmental management, in February 1999. Under the system, the city intends to redouble efforts for the realization of "an environmental model city" making the most of the lessons from Minamata disease and fulfill the roles local governments should play in the preservation and revival of the global environment. There were multiple effects the city hoped to achieve with the implementation of ISO throughout the city:

- A significant step for Minamata City to be recognized by everybody as an international environmental model city.
- Improvement of the regional image (may give favorable effects at the Local Government Environmental Council, Mansfield Environment International Conference in 2000, Mercury International Meeting in 2001, etc.)
- Reduction of costs through energy and resource saving, including lower costs of electricity and paper used at the municipal office and related facilities.
- Changes of ideas on environment and progress in activities of staff members.
- Rationalization of administration and progress of reform as a result of the introduction of the system.
- Improvement of ideas and influence on concrete activities of citizens as a result of the acquisition of environmental ISO by the municipal office.
- Support of small enterprises in the city in the acquisition of environmental ISO.

==== Eco-Shop Certification system ====
Minamata City established a system for certifying craftsmen who attach much importance to the environment in their production activities. This is called the Environment Master System, and commenced in fiscal 1998, before any other city in Japan. This is to improve the status and consciousness of craftsman and promote the creation of safe and sound commodities in consideration of environment and health, reflecting their experience with Minamata disease. In the first year, fiscal 1998, nine craftsmen engaged in the activities of paper making, and the production of tea leaves, bread, tangerine oranges, vegetables, rice or eggs were certified. In fiscal 1999, five craftsmen including a tatami-maker were additionally certified, making the current total of certified environmental masters fourteen. All of them produce products with confidence and pay careful attention to the environment in every part of their processes, including materials selection, production, processing, selling, and disposal of waste. "Products produced by environmental masters" mean safe and sound products certified by the municipal office. For some time in the past, Minamata-made products were not favorably accepted on the market due to the bad image of the city. Nonetheless, people in Minamata have learned through experience the dreadfulness of environmental pollution and because of this, they can now produce truly safe and harmless products. Before the establishment of the master system, Minamata products were simply products produced with confidence by people who were particularly concerned about the environment. In the future, however, they will be traded as brand products produced by the renowned environmental masters of Minamata City. There are six qualification criteria to become an environmental master:

1. Have been engaged in production in consideration of environment and health for 5 years or longer.
2. Have experience in production in consideration of environment and health, including the use of natural materials and elimination of chemicals
3. Have detailed knowledge, experience, technology, etc. in relation to production in consideration of environment and health.
4. Engaged in activities in relation to the preservation of the local environment.
5. Have detailed knowledge about environmental problems and preservation.
6. Have detailed knowledge upon pollution, including the Minamata disease.

=== Development of environmentally friendly industries ===
Minamata tries to develop environmentally friendly industries with three goals. The first topic is producing biomass energy from regional resources. The resources they want to use are citrus fruit, bamboo and food waste, to produce bio-ethanol and E3. But in the environmental report of the city from 2011. It is not stated that biomass energy is used and most of the energy is purchased (48%) or made from oil (44%). In January 2012 a test facility to make Bio-ethanol from bamboo was opened with a capacity of 100.000 kilolitres/year capacity. The facility will run for the remainder of 2012 to consider the feasibility of the process.

The second goal is to have safe and reliable production in Agriculture, Forestry and Fisheries. The emphasis in this project is on local food production to reduce food mileage. Local agriculture produces mostly rice, mandarins and local salad onions. After the Minamata disease scandal local farmers wanted to show that their products were safe, so they changed their way of production by: not using pesticides anymore, use 70% less fertilizer and instead started using a special fertilizer from Chisso. In the 2011 environmental report the local production was stable for the last 10 years and the advice was to promote local production. Fishing was not possible from 1970 till 1997, because the bay was closed with a net to prevent the catching of contaminated fish. During this period fishers were compensated by the local government. When the nets were removed sardine catching started to flourish and there now are full-time and part-time fishers, who combine fishing with other jobs.

Finally the last goal for the industry is Development of a Second Eco-Industrial Housing Complex. With this program the city wants to build an industrial park mostly filled with companies that focus on the environment and the park is now filled with companies like:

- Act-be Recycling a company that dismantles TVs, air conditioners, washing machines and refrigerators.
- Tanaka a glass recycling company that reuses used bottles and makes paving out of the unused ones, with a capacity of 8 million bottles per year.
- RBS a company that makes fertilizer from sewage and other materials.
- Repla-tec recycle waste plastic into resin for furthering manufacturing purposes, accepts all waste plastic from Minamata City.
- Minamata Environmental Technology Center is a research center that researches and promotes technology transfer with an environmental benefit.
- Kiraku Mining Industries recycles waste oils into low-sulfur heavy oil that can be reused.
- Southern Kyushu Tire Recycling collects old tires and makes rubber powder feedstock out of them or other new rubber products

The different companies in the park vary in size and capacity and some companies only process products from Minamata city, while others process products from the region or the country. Part of this park is made possible by subsidies,.

=== Development of a nature-oriented ecological town ===
Natural environment preservation sector:

Goals:

- Strengthening relations with the central town
- Support for activities in mountainous and coastal areas
- Cultivation of water resources and forests by the residents, revitalization of the sea
- Accelerate the absorption of carbon dioxide
- Use of natural energy

District Environmental Agreement System:

There are 26 districts within the city of Minamata. Each district develops their own environmental agreement system by allowing the local residents to establish "lifestyle rules" for their district. The Kagumeishi District Residents' Association (Environment Department) has developed one of the most extensive environmental agreement systems seen below:

- We will preserve the waterfront, rivers and streamside forests, the habitats of fireflies and dragonflies.
- We will not pollute water resources and will preserve riverside scenery.
- We will ensure that districts save clean water
- As a rule, unless an agreement is made by Kagumeishi District, we prohibit quarrying in forests due to the risk of rock-falls, the outflow of soil and landslides. Quarrying from valleys is also prohibited to prevent the landscape from being spoiled and the outflow of soil caused by freshets.
- We will reduce the amount of household garbage and try to recycle it.
- We will reduce over-packaging and try to take as little waste home as possible.
- Under the slogan "mottainai" we will try to use things for as long as possible by repairing them.
- When we dispose of recyclable garbage, we will make sure to separate it based on city guidelines.
- We will make compost from garbage.
- We will take care not to cause disasters when we construct roads or cut down trees in the mountains.
- We will guard the districts against illegal dumping.

Creating an Environmentally Symbiotic Region:

Part of the goal of Minamata becoming an eco town is to maximize, protect, and integrate the town with the environment. Programs to foster and maintain ecosystems began in 1998. One specific goal is to have forests cover 75% of the city area. Other generalized goals serve to maintain and improve absorption levels of carbon dioxide, and revitalize the sea with abundant marine plant life. Several districts have implemented projects to help create an environmentally symbiotic region:

- Creating eco-tourism.
- Building terraced fields with flowers and fruit.
- Management of "Citizens Forest" and expansion of forest lands.
- Cultivation of seaweed (kelp) and the reconstruction of kelp farms.

Utilizing New and Natural Energy:

Minamata is striving to implement new and natural energy measures. Sources of natural energy: wind and solar. Wind and solar energy is mostly used for providing energy for buildings and infrastructure. Sources of new energy: bioethanol from bamboo, citrus fruit extract, thinned wood, and other plants. Bioethanol is mostly used for transportation and shipping. JNC Corp is one such bioethanol plant that was established in early 2012 that will produce 100,000 kiloliters/ year of bioethanol from bamboo.

=== Development of The City for Environmental Learning ===
In this target area, Minamata eco-town committed itself to the four following goals:

- Publishing the lessons of Minamata disease.
- Promoting effects inside and outside by developing personnel.
- Developing of a base for environmental learning.
- Establishment of natural environmental learning and excursion programs.

In 1998, Minamata City set up an original certification system to support producers, which is called the "Environmental Meister Programme". The "Environmental Meister Programme" certification focuses on environment and health, but not on a specific field of production, which is quite unique. This system guarantees that certain products are safe to use.

In 2000, Minamata City obtained ISO14001 certification to reduce environmental burdens associated with service businesses for citizens. The city drew up a version of ISO, for various service businesses for citizens, such as an office, home, preschool and hotel. The city has the authority to do the assessment, the certification and the promotion of the ISOs.

All of the 16 elementary and junior high schools in the city work on the school version of ISO to achieve the following goals:

- To conserve and pass on to the future generations the beautiful sea, mountains, rivers and air of Minamata.
- To grow the spirit to be proud of their home Minamata.
- To cooperate in family and community activities.

At the first school that implemented the school version of environmental ISO, teachers and students made an action plan. Every two weeks, they reflect on their conduct, in order to achieve a lifestyle by which they can conserve and improve the environment. The aim of this project is to make the actions as practical as possible, so children can easily implement that in their everyday life.

The Japan International Cooperation Agency (JICA) established a training program in which participants can learn the lessons of Minamata. At the end of the program, the participants are expected to achieve the following:

- Being able to explain how serious, how difficult to overcome, and how important to prevent pollution damages through learning experiences of Minamata City and Japan.
- Being able to explain approaches towards sustainable society through collaboration with residents, enterprises, and governments, following Minamata City as a model.
- Being able to explain how local governments promote environmental mind, and how they collaborate with community to conduct environmental education.
- Being able to explain environmental policies in corresponding governorates.

In Minamata itself, there are several environmental learning programs. At the Kumamato Prefecture Environmental Center, visitors can gain knowledge and understanding about environmental problems at facilities. This program focuses on daily life. There is also a program about aquatic environment, a program about pollution in rivers and several programs regarding recycling.

== Geography ==
=== Surrounding municipalities ===
- Kagoshima Prefecture
  - Isa
  - Izumi
- Kumamoto Prefecture
  - Ashikita
  - Kuma
  - Tsunagi

=== Climate ===
Climate data for Minamata, 1991–2020 normals, extremes 1976–present
Month	Jan	Feb	Mar	Apr	May	Jun	Jul	Aug	Sep	Oct	Nov	Dec	Year
Record high °C (°F)	22.3 (72.1)	24.3 (75.7)	27.1 (80.8)	30.2 (86.4)	33.8 (92.8)	35.1 (95.2)	38.1 (100.6)	38.6 (101.5)	37.9 (100.2)	32.9 (91.2)	28.8 (83.8)	24.6 (76.3)	38.1 (100.6)
Mean daily maximum °C (°F)	11.0 (51.8)	12.4 (54.3)	15.7 (60.3)	20.6 (69.1)	24.9 (76.8)	27.2 (81.0)	31.1 (88.0)	32.3 (90.1)	29.2 (84.6)	24.2 (75.6)	18.8 (65.8)	13.4 (56.1)	21.7 (71.1)
Daily mean °C (°F)	6.8 (44.2)	7.8 (46.0)	10.9 (51.6)	15.3 (59.5)	19.6 (67.3)	22.9 (73.2)	26.7 (80.1)	27.4 (81.3)	24.3 (75.7)	19.1 (66.4)	13.9 (57.0)	8.8 (47.8)	17.0 (62.5)
Mean daily minimum °C (°F)	2.6 (36.7)	3.2 (37.8)	6.1 (43.0)	10.3 (50.5)	14.8 (58.6)	19.4 (66.9)	23.3 (73.9)	25.7 (78.3)	20.5 (68.9)	14.8 (58.6)	9.5 (49.1)	4.5 (40.1)	12.9 (55.2)
Record low °C (°F)	−7.4 (18.7)	−4.9 (23.2)	−2.4 (27.7)	−0.4 (31.3)	6.8 (44.2)	11.3 (52.3)	17.2 (63.0)	17.6 (63.7)	9.0 (48.2)	3.6 (38.5)	0.0 (32.0)	−3.2 (26.2)	−7.4 (18.7)
Average precipitation mm (inches)	71.1 (2.80)	94.7 (3.73)	130.1 (5.12)	143.3 (5.64)	187.2 (7.37)	463.8 (18.26)	410.7 (16.17)	232.6 (9.16)	212.1 (8.35)	97.5 (3.84)	98.8 (3.89)	80.2 (3.16)	2,222.1 (87.49)
Average precipitation days (≥ 1.0 mm)	8.9	9.8	11.7	10.7	9.7	15.4	12.4	10.9	10.2	7.5	8.6	8.8	124.6
Mean monthly sunshine hours	119.5	135.6	168.2	184.9	194.8	131.2	202.3	223.4	178.3	185.1	149.0	129.3	2,001.7
Source 1: JMA
Source 2: JMA

== Demography ==
According to Japanese census data, this is the population of Minamata in recent years.

1995	2000	2005	2010	2015	2020
32,842	31,147	29,120	26,978	25,411	23,580

== Sister cities ==
- Devonport, Australia, since 1996

== Notable people ==
- Hisashi Eguchi
