= Komekurayama Solar Power Plant =

Solar power plant operated by Tepco in Japan

Coordinates: 35°35′N 138°34′E

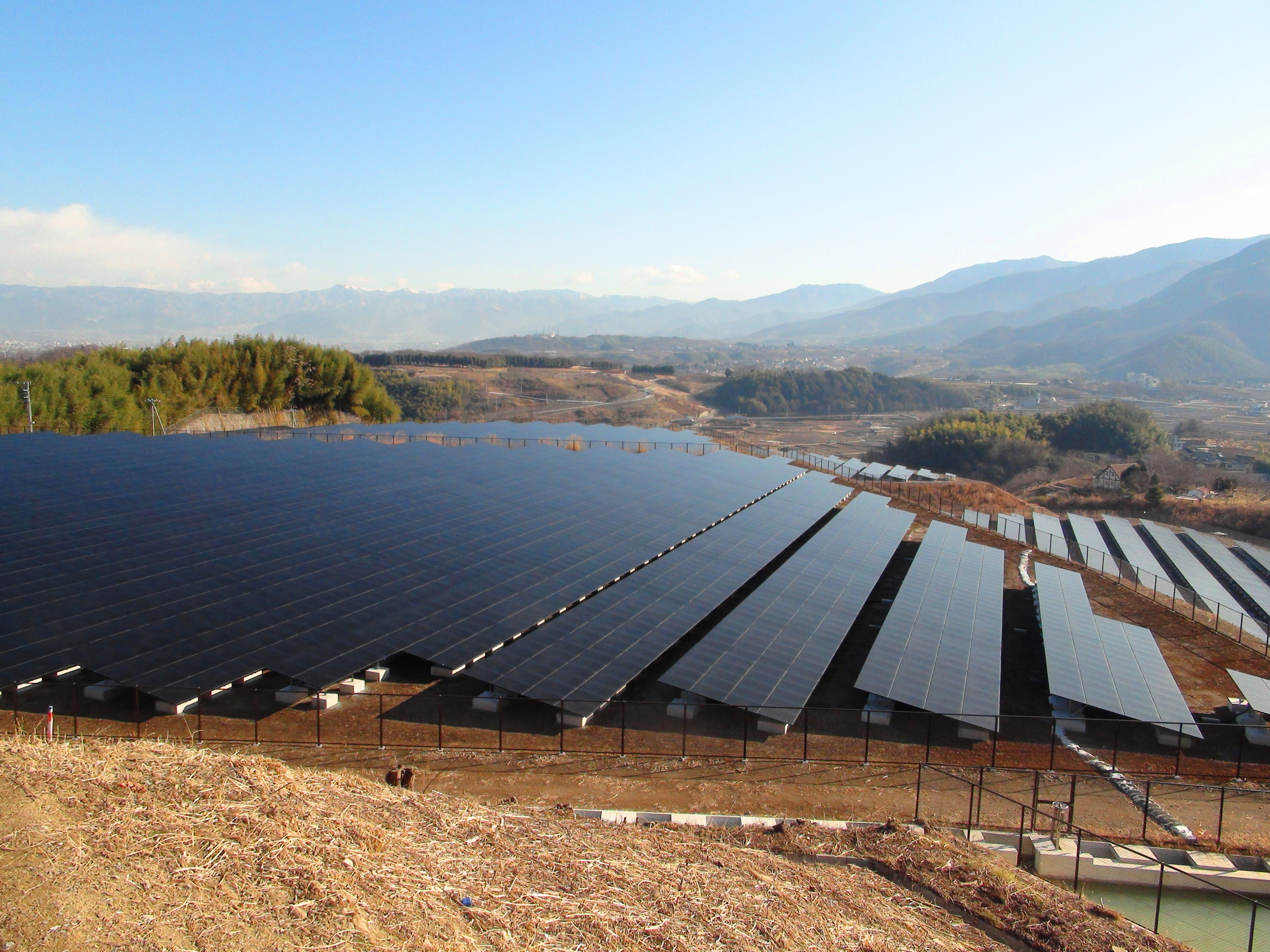
Part of the Solarpark

The Komekurayama Solar Power Plant (米倉山太陽光発電所) is a 10 megawatt (MW) solar photovoltaic power station located at Mt. Komekura. It is the third solar plant built by Tepco, and was completed on January 27, 2012. In the first year of operation, it produced 14,434 MWh, which was about 20% greater than anticipated.

== See also ==
- Ogishima Solar Power Plant
- Ukishima Solar Power Plant
- Solar power in Japan
