= Ōnodai Dolmen Cluster =

- 大野台支石墓群 (Japanese)
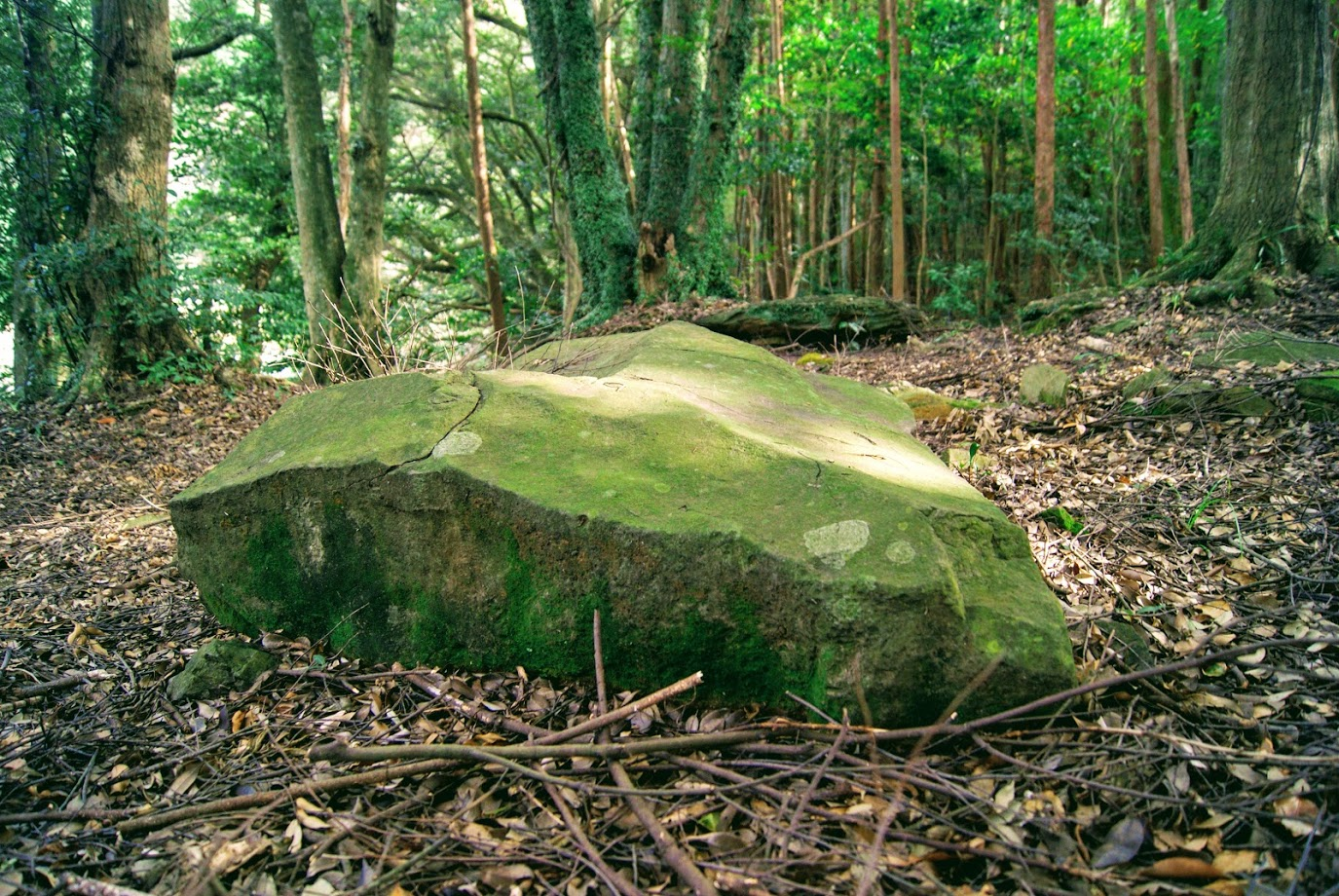
- Ōnodai Dolmen Cluster, Dolmen #15

- Ōnodai Dolmen Cluster Ōnodai Dolmen Cluster (Japan)
- Interactive map of Ōnodai Dolmen Cluster
- 33°17′54.9″N 129°37′8.8″E
- Periods: Jōmon period
- Location: Sasebo, Nagasaki, Japan
- Region: Kyushu

Site notes
- Public access: Yes

The Ōnodai Dolmen Cluster (大野台支石墓群, Ōnodai shisekibo-gun) is an archaeological site with a late Jōmon cemetery containing at least 71 dolmens, located in the Shikamachi neighbourhood of city of Sasebo, Nagasaki Prefecture Japan. The site was designated a National Historic Site of Japan in 1985. It is the oldest in Japan, along with the Harayama Dolmen Cluster on the Shimabara Peninsula.

== Overview ==
The Ōnodai Dolmen Cluster is located south of Emukae Bay, on a plateau about 70–80 meters above sea level. It spreads out over an area of about 250 meters east-to-west and 200 meters north-to-south, and is divided into five main sites, A to E, with only Site C and E being included in the National Historic Site designation. In 1963, a local resident discovered a stone coffin, and several archaeological excavations were conducted from 1966 onwards Site C was surveyed in 1966, and eight box-shaped stone coffins and one jar coffin were found. Site E is located at the highest point, 80 meters above sea level, and 38 dolmens were found there. All of the sites date mainly to the late Jōmon period based on Jōmon pottery found in or around the dolmens, but at Site E, ritual remains belonging to the late Yayoi period were found, including the handle of a wide bronze spear and Yayoi pottery, but these artifacts are believed to postdate the dolmens. The substructure of the dolmens is mostly a box-shaped stone coffin, which is a characteristic of the dolmens in Nagasaki Prefecture.

As of 2010, 13 dolmen sites have been confirmed in Nagasaki Prefecture (including this site), and seven of these (including this site), are in the northern part of the prefecture, all of which are adjacent to alluvial plains near the coast. It has also been pointed out that there are similarities with the Ukumatsubara Dolmen Site on Ukujima island, as well as dolmen sites distributed in Saga Prefecture and Itoshima, Fukuoka, such as the Shito Dolmen Cluster.

Excavated items and materials are stored and exhibited at the Shikamachi History and Folklore Museum. The site is about a 20-minute walk from Emukae-Shikamachi Station on the Matsuura Railway Nishi-Kyushu Line.

== See also ==
- List of Historic Sites of Japan (Nagasaki)
