= Ogishima Solar Power Plant =

13 MW solar photovoltaic power station

Coordinates: 35°29′19″N 139°43′38″E

The Ogishima Solar Power Plant (扇島太陽光発電所) is a 13 MW solar photovoltaic power station located on the waterfront in Kawasaki. It is the second, and the largest solar plant built by Tepco, and was completed on December 19, 2011. In the first year of operation, it produced 15,059 MWh, a capacity factor of 0.13, which was about 10% greater than anticipated. An unusual feature of the plant is that the panels are mounted at a fixed angle of 10°, instead of the 30°, which would normally be considered optimal for this latitude.

== See also ==
- Komekurayama Solar Power Plant
- Ukishima Solar Power Plant
- Solar power in Japan
