= Harayama Dolmen Cluster =

Archaeological site in Japan

- 原山支石墓群 (Japanese)
- Harayama Dolmen Cluster Harayama Dolmen Cluster (Japan)
- Interactive map of Harayama Dolmen Cluster
- 32°40′45.8″N 130°12′22.4″E
- Periods: Jōmon period
- Location: Minamishimabara, Nagasaki, Japan
- Region: Kyushu

Site notes
- Public access: Yes

The Harayama Dolmen Cluster (原山支石墓群, Harayama shisekibo-gun) is an archaeological site with a late Jōmon cemetery located in the Kita-Arima neighbourhood of city of Minamishimabara, Nagasaki Prefecture Japan. The site was designated a National Historic Site of Japan in 1972. It is the oldest in Japan, along with the Ōnodai Dolmen Cluster on the Shimabara Peninsula.

== Overview ==
The Harayama Dolmen Cluster is located in the highlands at an elevation of about 250 meters, which extends from Mount Unzen in the southwestern part of the Shimabara Peninsula. It is a communal graveyard from the late Jōmon period, and archaeological excavations were carried out in parts of it in the 1950s and 1960s. It originally consisted of three groups, but the first group was lost due to land reclamation, and only the "third dolmen group" and the "second dolmen group" remain today. The 46 remaining dolmens are made up of several supporting stones with an andesite cover stone placed on top, and a box-type stone coffin, jar coffin, or earthen pit grave underneath. Most of the box-type stone coffins are about one meter long and 50-centimeters wide, and it is believed that the bodies buried in them were buried in a crouching position rather than lying down. About half of the dolmens have Jōmon pottery and stone knives from the late Jōmon period placed under the cover stone as grave goods. Thirty-six dolmens and pottery from the late Jōmon period bearing impressions of rice grains. It is believed that rice cultivation was introduced from mainland China (Zhejiang Province) in the late Jōmon period, which is contemporary with these graves.

The site has been developed as an archaeological park. It is located about 29.2 kilometers southwest of Shimabarakō Station on the Shimabara Railway Line.

As of 2010, 13 dolmen sites have been confirmed in Nagasaki Prefecture (including this site), and seven of these (including this site), are in the northern part of the prefecture, all of which are adjacent to alluvial plains near the coast. It has also been pointed out that there are similarities with the Ukumatsubara Dolmen Site on Ukujima island, as well as dolmen sites distributed in Saga Prefecture and Itoshima, Fukuoka, such as the Shito Dolmen Cluster.

== See also ==
- List of Historic Sites of Japan (Nagasaki)
