= Tobata Women's Association =

Japanese anti-pollution group (1950–1970)

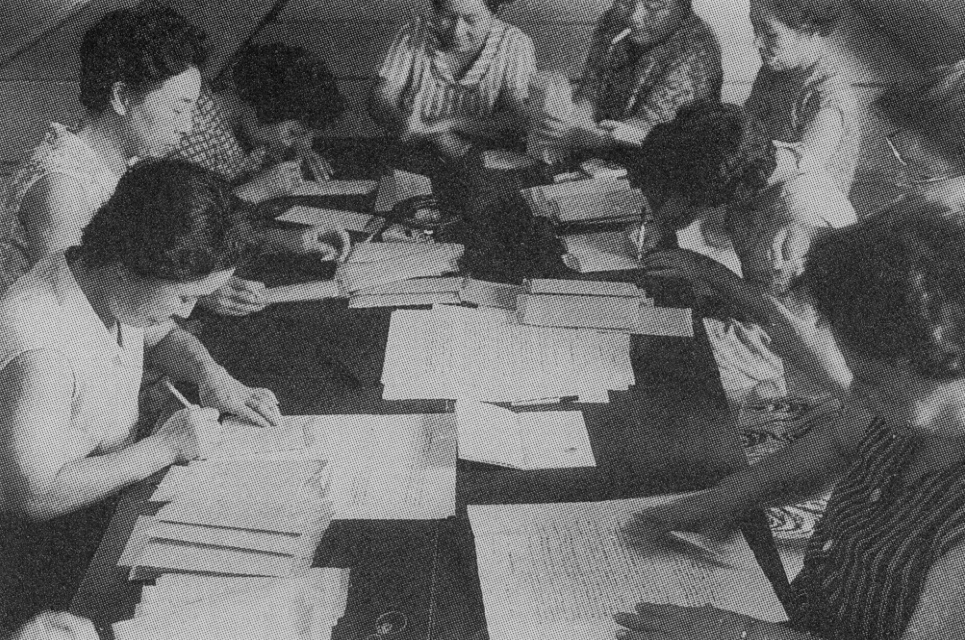
Members preparing letters of inquiry addressed to local government and corporations in 1967

The Tobata Council of Women's Associations, (Note: Founded in 1950 as the "Tobata City Council of Women's Associations" (戸畑市婦人会協議会, Tobata-shi fujinkai kyōgikai). Renamed the "Kitakyushu City Tobata Ward Council of Women's Associations" (北九州市戸畑区婦人会協議会, Kitakyūshū-shi Tobata-ku fujinkai kyōgikai) in 1963 when Tobata was amalgamated into Kitakyushu.) commonly known as the Tobata Women's Association (TWA; Japanese: 戸畑婦人会, romanised: Tobata fujinkai), was a federation of civic groups based in the Tobata ward of Kitakyushu, Fukuoka Prefecture, Japan. Founded in March 1950, the organisation initiated a grassroots campaign against pollution in the city, the heart of one of Japan's major industrial zones, during the 1950s and 1960s. The campaign was rooted in independent scientific research; housewives would conduct experiments to measure pollution levels and identify their connection with human health impacts in their neighbourhoods. Their work would become identified with the slogan "We want our blue sky back" (青空がほしい, Aozora ga hoshii), the name of a widely-screened 8mm colour film produced by the TWA in 1965, and a series of reports published each year from 1965 to 1969. The campaign raised awareness of the harms of pollution, and spurred public–private co-operation to curb it in Kitakyushu, resulting in improvements to the city's environmental conditions. Amid growing societal consciousness of the issue, the TWA wound down its anti-pollution activities in 1970.

== Background ==
Tobata, now incorporated into the city of Kitakyushu, is part of what was called the "Kitakyushu Industrial Zone" (北九州工業地帯, Kitakyūshū kōgyō-chitai), a large expanse of factories centred on the Yahata Steel Works, which opened in 1901. During Japan's rapid economic growth in the 1950s and 1960s, production increases caused serious pollution in industrial areas across the country, and many people came to suffer from pollution-related ailments. Tobata and neighbouring Yahata were no exception: a significant increase in industrial activity resulted in the emission of large amounts of soot, dust, smoke and other contaminants. Pollution in this area was the worst in Japan. The sky was enveloped in industrial emissions that were deemed the "seven-coloured smoke" (七色の煙, nana-iro no kemuri) by local residents for their varied hues, and the Dōkai Bay was so polluted that it was known as the "Sea of Death" (死の海, shi no umi). By 1961, the Yahata Steel Works alone emitted 27 tonnes (30 short tons) of particulate matter per day from 62 smokestacks. Factories covered 70% of the land area of Tobata in the 1960s, and Yahata Steel owned more than half of the city. It was in this context that women's associations in Tobata began to organise against pollution.

== History ==
=== Establishment ===
The first Tobata Women's Association to be established after the Second World War was founded in autumn 1946. The then mayor's wife, Tsuruta Yoshiko, was its chairman. In an era of post-war hardship, the organisation focused on providing for the welfare of its members. Its activities included researching how to use local plants as food and efficient ways to use rations, and holding bartering events. In March 1948, Charlotte Crist, a representative of the American military government (or GHQ) with responsibility for women's affairs in Fukuoka Prefecture, visited Tobata to observe the association's activities. She criticised the appointment of the mayor's wife as chairman as undemocratic, and ordered that elections be held. The association protested, but was then forcibly dissolved on 31 March.

Crist visited Tobata regularly in the subsequent months, providing guidance on how to create democratic, independent organisations for women. She intended Tobata to serve as a model case for the democratic mobilisation of women in Japan, where grassroots groups free from government influence would work to solve problems relevant to their communities. The first of these new organisations, the Nakabaru Women's Association (中原婦人会, Nakabaru fujinkai), was established in Tobata's Nakabaru area in May 1948. While the original Tobata Women's Association functioned at the municipal level, these new groups were created on an entirely voluntary basis by housewives in neighbourhoods across the city. In March 1950, a new Tobata Women's Association was created to serve as a city-wide umbrella organisation for the numerous neighbourhood groups.

=== Nakabaru ash investigation (1950–1952) ===
In 1950, Nakabaru association members discussed the problem of ash being emitted from a nearby coal-fired power station. The women decided that they should first try to investigate the situation themselves. First, they visually confirmed that ash was being emitted from the station along with a violent noise during the night. Then, they decided to establish four emissions monitoring stations across Tobata. They hung up bedclothes and white shirts, both starched and unstarched, at each station and left them to dry for 3 months. They found that the starched linens were rendered so soiled as to be uncleanable, and that those closest to the power station were in the worst condition. In 1951, they brought the results of their investigation to city councillors, pressuring them to act. The issue was quickly taken up by the local authorities, who held discussions with the power company. It agreed to swiftly address the problem by installing additional dust collectors, with all works complete by March 1952.

As a result of the Nakabaru Women's Association's efforts, the Tobata municipal government would go on to purchase emissions monitoring equipment; seven stations measuring sulphur dioxide gas and particulate quantities were set up across Tobata from May 1958. The city also began to offer subsidies for dust collector installation. From 1959, emissions monitoring was expanded to the neighbouring four cities that would merge with Tobata to form Kitakyushu in 1963.

=== Sanroku pollution research (1960–1964) ===
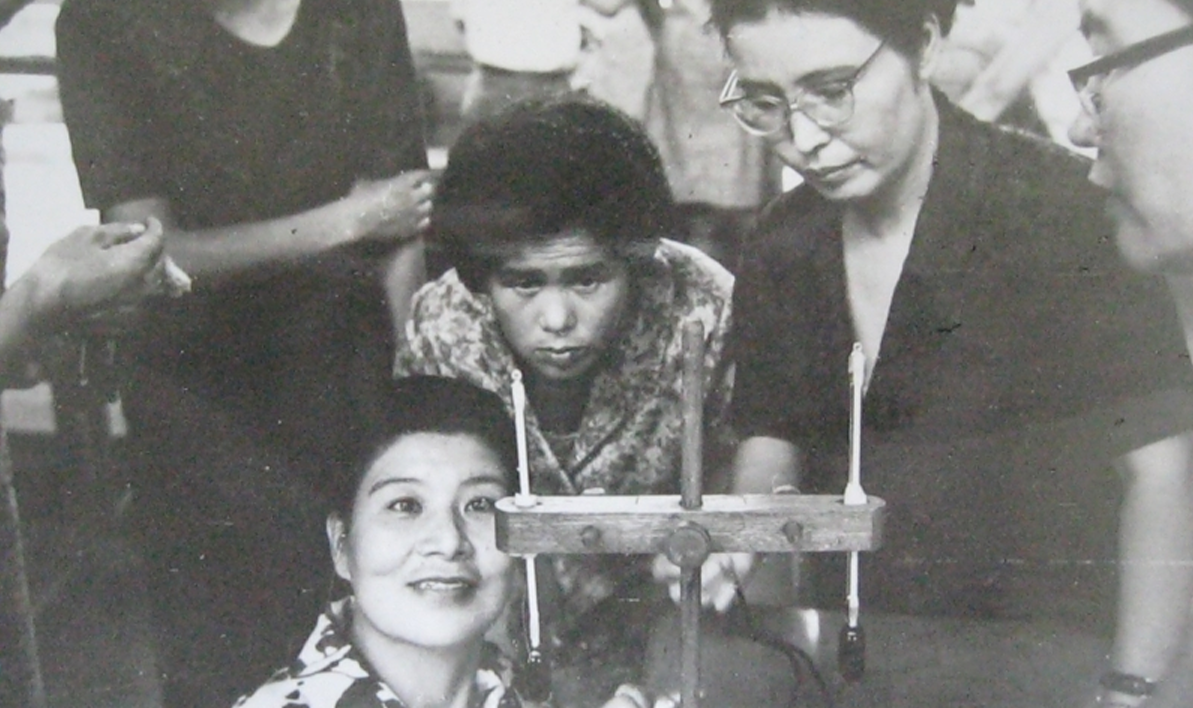
Members practising air pollution measurement methods

Starting in the 1950s, residents of the Sanroku neighbourhood of Tobata were exposed to noxious gas and soot emitted from pitch coke and carbon black production facilities operated by Nippon Steel Chemical as part of the Yahata Steel Works complex. The Sanroku Women's Association (三六婦人会, Sanroku fujinkai), together with other community groups, began to push for remediation in 1960. Numerous complaints about the pollution problem were lodged at meetings held at the Sanroku Community Centre (kōminkan) in 1961. Residents brought soot-stained shōji paper, magazines, and grass as evidence. After repeated discussion, the municipal government agreed to send a party of representatives to Nippon Steel Chemical's headquarters in Tokyo to petition for redress. Nakasu Sugako, chairman of the Sanroku Women's Association, was selected to represent the neighbourhood in these negotiations. As a result, Nippon Steel Chemical agreed to add a scrubber to the carbon black plant, and a gas collection system to the pitch coke plant. These did not resolve the problem, however, due to the lack of a back-up power supply, and the outdated design of the coking furnace.

In 1963, Hayashi Eidai came to Sanroku to work for the Tobata Board of Education. Placed in charge of the Sanroku and Nakabaru community centres, he was shocked by the air quality in the area, and encouraged the Sanroku Women's Association to begin an independent scientific study of the pollution problem. Starting from May 1963, the women decided to take example from the Nakabaru association's work, and hung 30 pieces of cloth at each of three different points in Sanroku, and checked their condition every ten days. They also conducted a survey of local residents, measured quantities of falling soot and dust using empty shirt boxes, and sent samples to the Kyushu Institute of Technology for analysis. The results of these studies were presented at an event held jointly by the Tobata Women's Association and the Tobata Board of Education in October 1963, and were widely covered on television, radio and in newspapers. With the municipal and prefectural governments as intermediaries, the Sanroku Women's Association was able to pressure Nippon Steel Chemical to upgrade its outdated coking furnace, and install a backup power supply for its dust collectors. The parties agreed to settle the dispute with these conditions in February 1964.

=== We Want our Blue Sky Back (1965–1969) ===
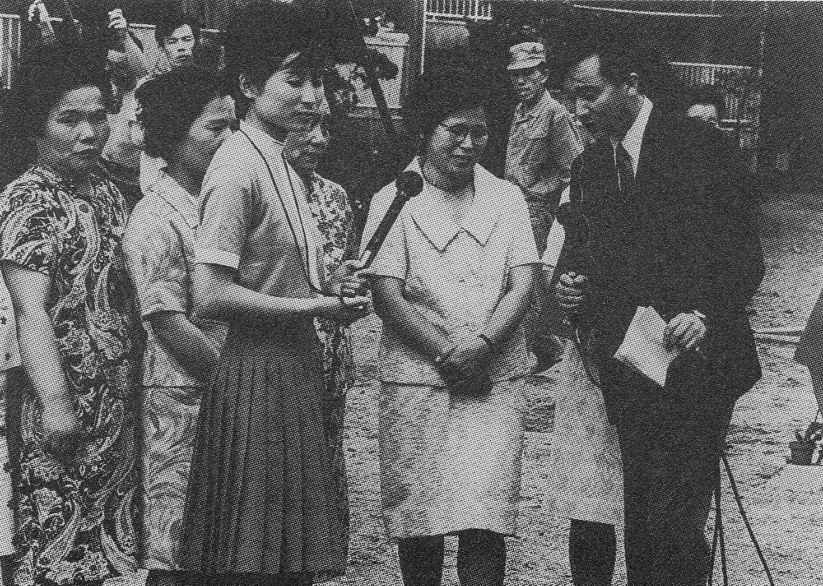
Members being interviewed by the local media

While the dispute with Nippon Steel Chemical was settled, the broader pollution issue had yet to be resolved. The Sanroku Women's Association thus decided to continue monitoring air quality. It was in 1964 that the Sanroku association first proclaimed the words "We want our blue sky back" (青空がほしい, Aozora ga hoshii), which later became the slogan of Kitakyushu's anti-pollution movement. Building on Sanroku's experience, the Tobata Women's Association decided to take up pollution as a Tobata-wide research topic in 1965. The TWA had grown to host 13 different neighbourhood associations, with 6,900 members. Hayashi Eidai suggested the formation of a pollution research committee, with one member from each of the 13 associations. Yamaguchi University professor Nose Yoshikatsu, was invited to share his experience of tackling pollution in Ube, in neighbouring Yamaguchi Prefecture, and to provide guidance on the appropriate research methods. Members of the Sanroku association were despatched across Tobata to share what they had learned during their own investigation. One group of women was tasked with gathering data, and visited city hall to review the pollution measurement statistics collected by the municipal governments of each of the five cities that had joined to form Kitakyushu in 1963. Nose provided guidance in analysing the data. Another group examined attendance records from all primary schools in Tobata from 1959 to 1965, aiming to identify a link between pollution levels and absences due to sickness. They also visited the local public health office to investigate local mortality rates and causes of death.

The results of this research project were assembled into a pamphlet called We Want our Blue Sky Back. The women found that the absence rate for primary school children suddenly increased in January and February, the months with the worst air pollution, every year for 6 years. They also produced a graph that demonstrated that deaths from asthma and respiratory conditions in Tobata were higher during what was called the winter "smog season". These findings suggested a link between air pollution and human health that had yet to be identified by public authorities, which shocked both politicians and researchers. Concurrently with the report, the TWA produced an 8mm colour film, called We Want our Blue Sky Back. Taking advantage of the facilities of the Board of Education, the women divided into groups to make the film, with the aim of spreading their anti-pollution message. The 29-minute film, which premiered in autumn 1965, was broadcast on nationwide television by public broadcaster NHK, and had a significant impact.

One challenge facing the TWA was that most of its members were economically dependent on the polluting companies. Their husbands were employed by Yahata Steel and related companies, and in many cases, they lived in company-provided accommodation. While their husbands acknowledged the pollution problem, they were also aware that these companies offered them comparatively high salaries, and that there were few other good opportunities in Kitakyushu. Accordingly, many men were infuriated when they learned that their wives were participating in activities that targeted their employers for criticism. The resulting strain on domestic relations caused a sudden decline in women's association membership in 1966, forcing the pollution committee to briefly pause its activities. According to Hayashi Eidai, some men whose wives were prominent activists were either dismissed from their post or transferred to other parts of Japan. This drove the TWA to take a non-confrontational approach, which avoided direct protest against the companies themselves.

Despite these hurdles, the TWA continued its research during 1966–1969, releasing successive pamphlets titled We Want our Blue Sky Back II–V each year. During this period, the women frequently appeared in the media, expanding their activities from research to activism. In 1967, they sent letters of inquiry to 83 companies across Kitakyushu, requesting information about dust collection and effluent treatment facilities. They received responses from 45, including Yahata Steel, which invited them to a meeting to explain its pollution control efforts, and Mitsubishi Chemical, which allowed them to inspect its plant in Kurosaki. In 1968, the TWA wrote to the parties represented in the Kitakyushu City Council, requesting that each one provide its position on the pollution problem. In response to the TWA's efforts, the city adopted the Kitakyushu Pollution Control Ordinance in April 1970. It also began its own pollution monitoring scheme, with the establishment of the municipal Pollution Monitoring Centre. Moreover, pollution had become a nationwide political issue. The 64th session of the National Diet, convened in November 1970, was called the "Pollution Diet" because it adopted a number of laws seeking to regulate and control pollution. After a 1971 mayoral election dominated by the pollution issue, Kitakyushu significantly tightened its own regulations with a revision of the Pollution Control Ordinance the same year.

=== Winding down ===
Amid this backdrop of regulatory action, the TWA's pollution-related research and activism would wind down, with most significant activities ending by 1970. One factor in the movement's decline was the loss of Hayashi Eidai, who was transferred to a different position 1968, before quitting the Kitakyushu municipal government altogether in 1970. Another factor was the rise of a leftist anti-pollution movement in the city. The TWA did not want to become caught up in an ideological and political dispute, as its members felt that this was in conflict with their position as housewives, who placed prime importance on the home. The focus of the pollution problem would shift from particulates to sulphur dioxide; as industry transitioned from coal to oil, emissions of dust, soot and ash declined, while those of sulphur dioxide rapidly increased. Kobori Satoru notes that the TWA could not easily mobilise against sulphur dioxide emissions, despite being aware of their significance, as unlike with particulates, there was no simple, economical solution to their elimination using the technology available at the time. As the TWA always took care to avoid action that would be economically injurious to local companies, it had reached the limit of what it could achieve.

== Legacy ==
The Tobata Women's Association played a critical role in raising the general public's awareness of the harms of pollution, and in Kitakyushu's history of environmental remediation. Their activism contributed to the formation of a community consensus in favour of tackling pollution, driving both local government and companies to action. As a result, Kitakyushu saw a significant decline in particulate pollution, and by the mid-1970s, the Dōkai Bay's water quality was improved. Over the period from 1972 to 1991, the city of Kitakyushu invested 804 billion yen (roughly 7 billion US dollars) in measures to control pollution and remediate environmental damage. The legacy of the women's movement was recognised at the 1992 United Nations Earth Summit, when Kitakyushu was honoured for its contributions to environmental management. The UN Environment Programme has described Kitakyushu as "one of the greatest environmental comeback stories of the 20th century", and a city that was "transformed from industrial wasteland to the first 'Eco Town' in Japan."

One feature that defined the TWA's activism was that it never took a confrontational stance toward industry, and did not question the city's "growth-oriented" strategy. Recognising the importance of industry to the local economy, the women focused their efforts on establishing pollution control regulations and encouraging the installation of pollution control equipment, requesting that companies embrace the practice of social responsibility, rather than trying to eliminate industrial activity altogether. This is distinct from concurrent anti-pollution movements elsewhere in Japan, such as that in Yokkaichi, Mie Prefecture, where locals initiated legal action against the polluter. As a result of their activism, Yahata Steel would go on to become an industry leader in pollution control, and worked to involve local stakeholders in decision-making. With support from Yahata Steel, the municipal government built a collaborative relationship with local businesses during the 1970s. This took the form of public–private environmental protection agreements, which facilitated the implementation of anti-pollution measures.
