= Ukishima =

Ukishima (written: 浮島 or 浮嶋) is a Japanese surname. Notable people with the surname include:

- Bin Ukishima (浮嶋 敏, born 1967), Japanese footballer and manager
- Tomoko Ukishima (浮島 智子, born 1963), Japanese politician
- Toshio Ukishima (浮島 敏男, born 1949), Japanese politician

== See also ==
- Ukishima Solar Power Plant, a power station in Kawasaki, Kanagawa Prefecture, Japan
