= Ukishima Solar Power Plant =

Photovoltaic power station located

Coordinates: 35°31′N 139°47′E

The Ukishima Solar Power Plant (Japanese: 浮島太陽光発電所) is a 7 MW solar photovoltaic power station located on the waterfront in Kawasaki. It is the first solar plant built by Tepco, and was completed on August 10, 2011. In the first year of operation, it produced 9,453 MWh, a capacity factor of 0.15, which was about 30% greater than anticipated. An unusual feature of the plant is that the panels are mounted at a fixed angle of 10°, instead of the 30°, which would normally be considered optimal for this latitude.

== See also ==
- Komekurayama Solar Power Plant
- Ogishima Solar Power Plant
- Solar power in Japan
