= Kushiro wetlands megasolar issue =

Environmental issue in Japan

- Part of the aftermath of the 2011 Tōhoku earthquake and tsunami, solar power and environmental issues in Japan
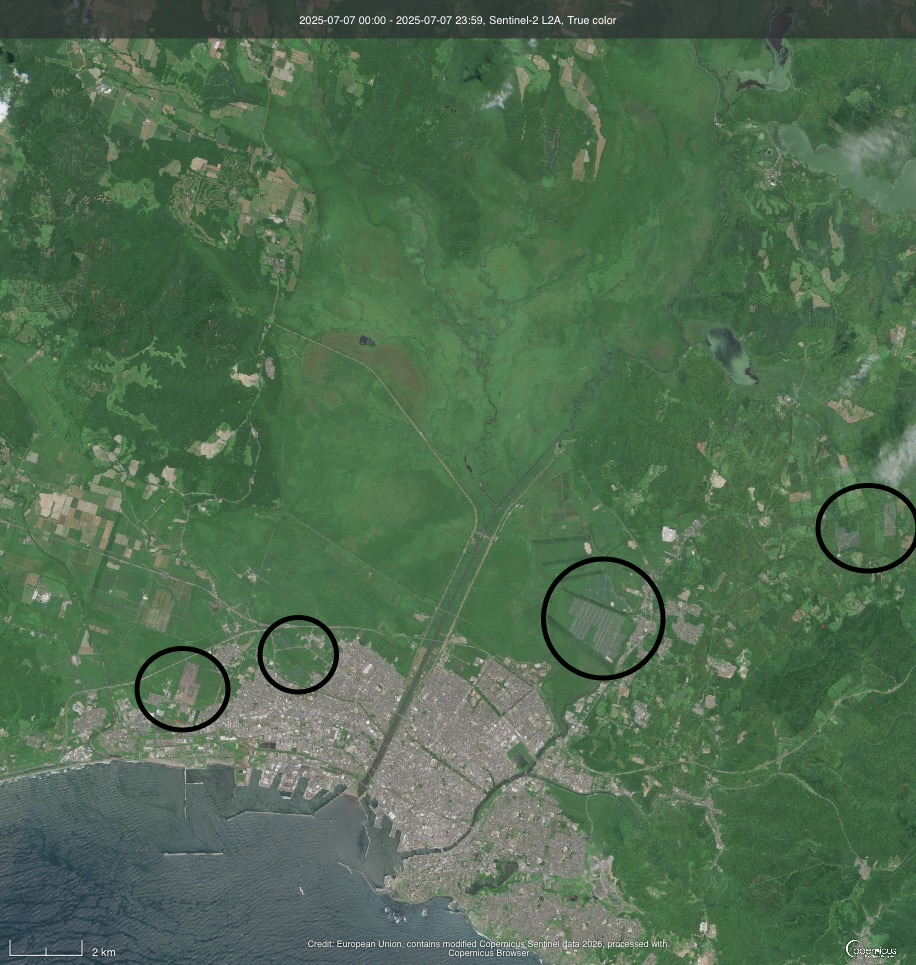
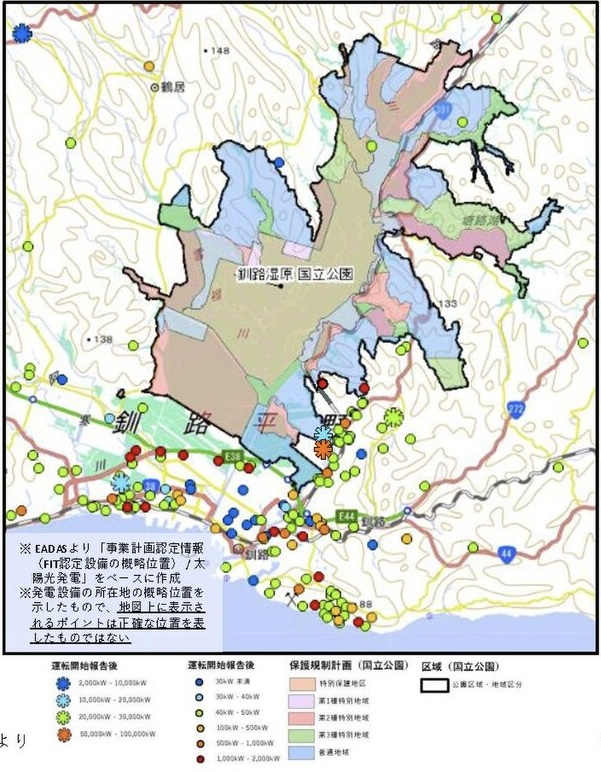
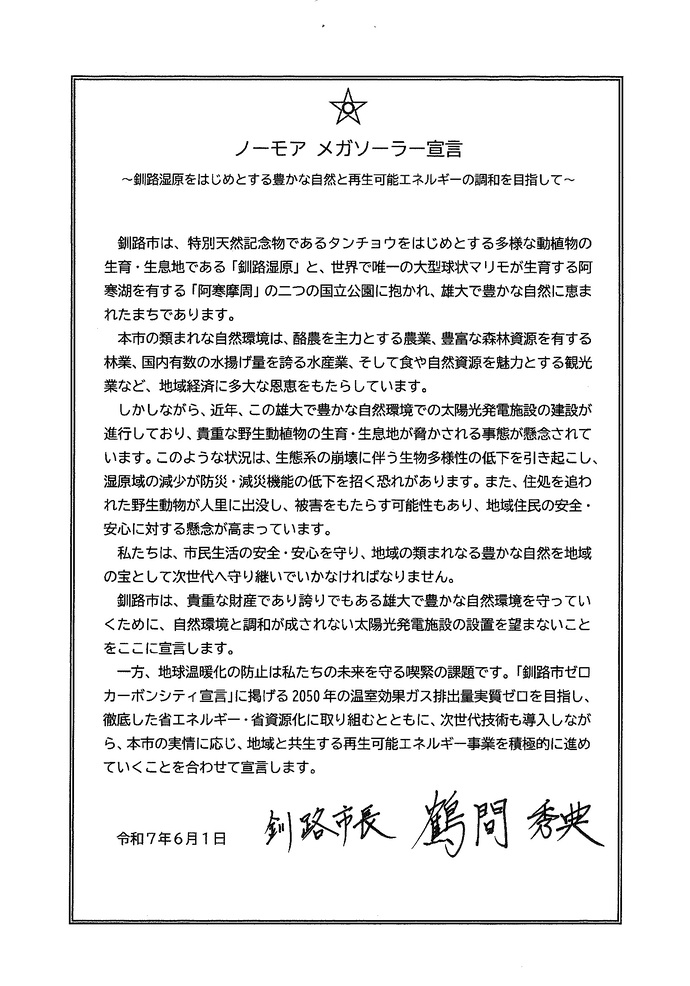
- From left to right: Aerial image of Kushiro-shitsugen National Park with mega solar plants in circle; Map of the solar plants in Kushiro; "No more mega solar" declaration by Kushiro City
- Date: 2012 – present Main surge: March 20, 2025 – present (1 year, 7 months and 29 days)
- Location: Kushiro wetlands, Hokkaido, Japan: Kushiro City (mainly); Kushiro town; Shibecha; Tsurui
- Caused by: Ecological concerns about the solar panels in the Kushiro wetlands; Japan Ecology attempts to construct a new megasolar plant in Kushiro City
- Goals: Blocking Japan Ecology on the construction of a new megasolar plant; Stricter regulations and policies on megasolar plants
- Methods: Petitions
- Status: Ongoing: Japan Ecology construction resumes; Several projects suspended; Stricter regulations regarding the installation of solar plants; New operators will be excluded from subsidy programs after 2027

Parties
Residents of Kushiro City Environmental groups: Kushiro Wetland Nature Regeneration Council; Nature Conservation Society of Kushiro; Kushiro City Government: Hidenori Tsuruma; City council of Kushiro; Supported by: Prefectural Government of Hokkaido: Naomichi Suzuki; (Japan) Japanese Government: Sanae Takaichi; Keiichiro Asao; Ishihara Hirotaka	Japan Ecology: Masanori Matsui

Since 2012, several solar facilities have been constructed in the area around Kushiro-shitsugen National Park in Japan, which the locals call a "sea of megasolar farms" (メガソーラーの海, Megasōrā no Umi). Several environmental groups and residents have expressed concern about the facilities' environmental impact on local wildlife.

Following the construction of mega solar farms by Japan Ecology, an Osaka-based enegy company, in Kushiro City in summer of 2025, the Kushiro wetlands megasolar issue (釧路湿原メガソーラー問題, Kushiro Shitugen megasōrā mondai) gained national attention and is widely reported in Japanese media which leads to the "No More Megasolar" declaration in Kushiro City and national policy change regarding the construction of Megasolar plants in Japan.

== Background ==
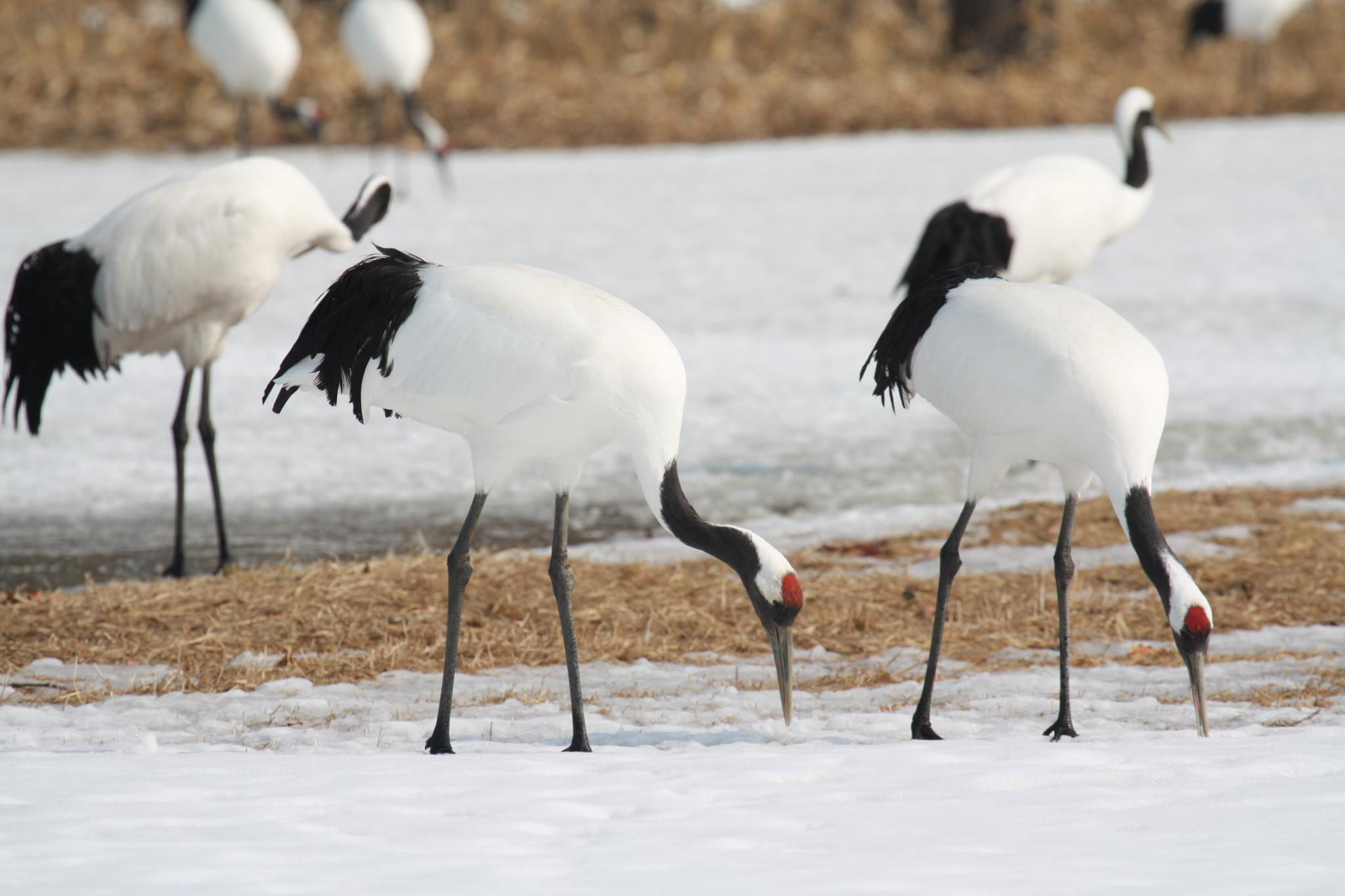
Red-crowned crane

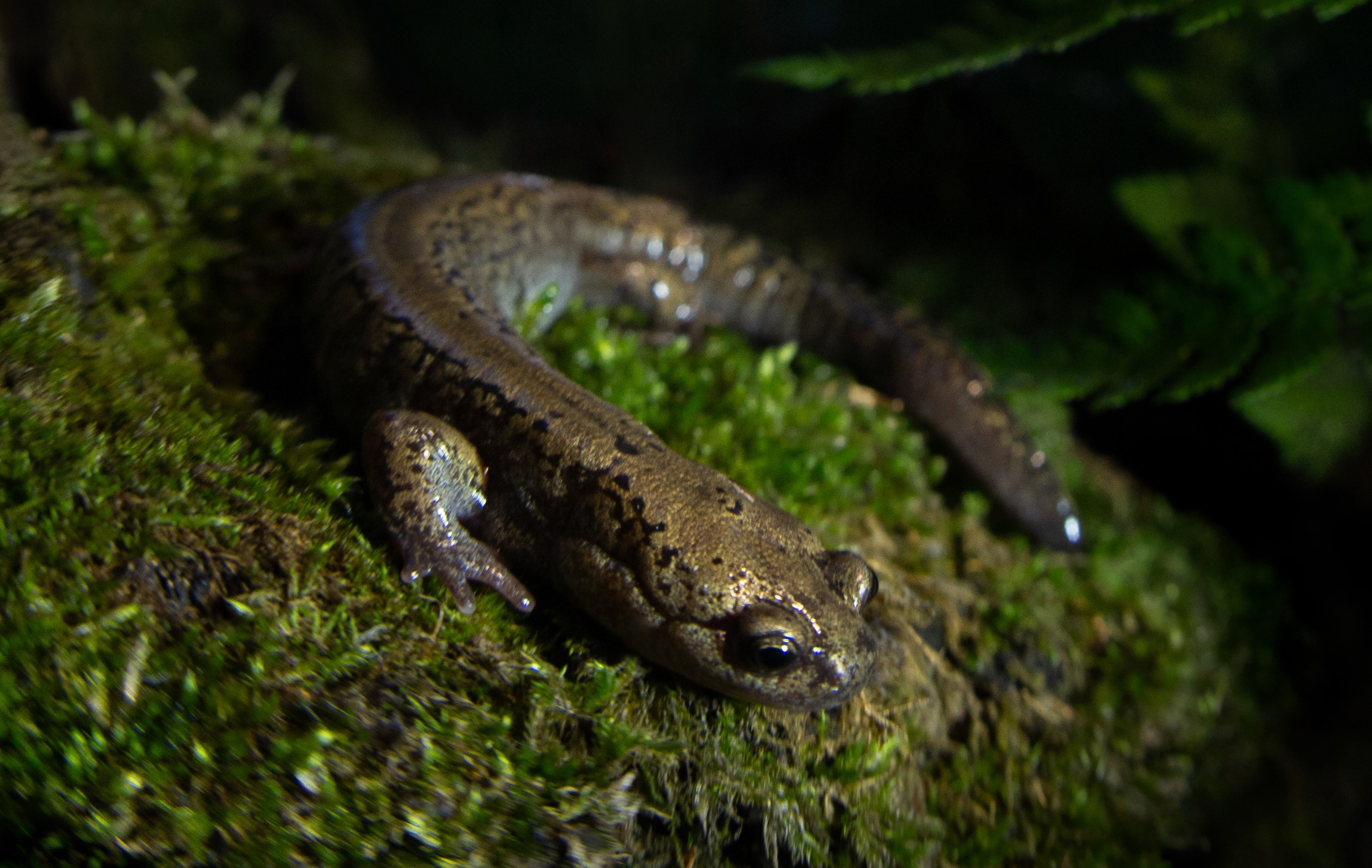
Siberian salamander

Kushiro-shitsugen National Park is a national park located in Kushiro, Hokkaido, and is the largest wetland in Japan. It was the first place in Japan to be registered at the Ramsar Convention as a critical wetland in the 1980s. It is home to over 2,000 species of plants and animals, including the endangered red-crowned cranes and Siberian salamander, which is a registered natural monument (a species with "high scientific value to Japan" according to the Cultural Property Act of Japan) of Kushiro and is listed on the Ministry of the Environment's red list, which is a list of endangered species in Japan.

Kushiro-shitsugen was identified as a site for potential development in the 1972 book Nippon-Rettō Kaizō-ron by Kakuei Tanaka, which sparked a debate on the future of the land, and led to the establishment of the national park.

== History ==
Following the aftermath of the 2011 Great East Japan earthquake, the Japanese government promoted solar power expansion. In 2012, the Japanese government implemented a feed-in tariff (FIT) system, which allowed electric power companies to purchase electricity generated from renewable energy sources at a price set by the government. During that time, 1 kilowatt-hour was equal to ¥42 (2012) (US$0.53). This initiative increased the number of megasolar operators in the area, which is considered to be an ideal environment for solar development because of its wide, flat land, long hours of sunshine, and close proximity to an urban area. Although the area is designated as a "non-urbanization zone", which prohibits erecting buildings around Kushiro-shitsugen National Park, the Building Standards Law does not consider solar panels to be "buildings", so their construction is permitted.

The number of megasolar power plants in the area has increased from only one plant in June 2014 to 27 plants by October 2024. By September 2023, the total number of solar power plants installed in the Kushiro Wetlands reached 301, up from only 50 a decade earlier.

=== Japan Ecology ===
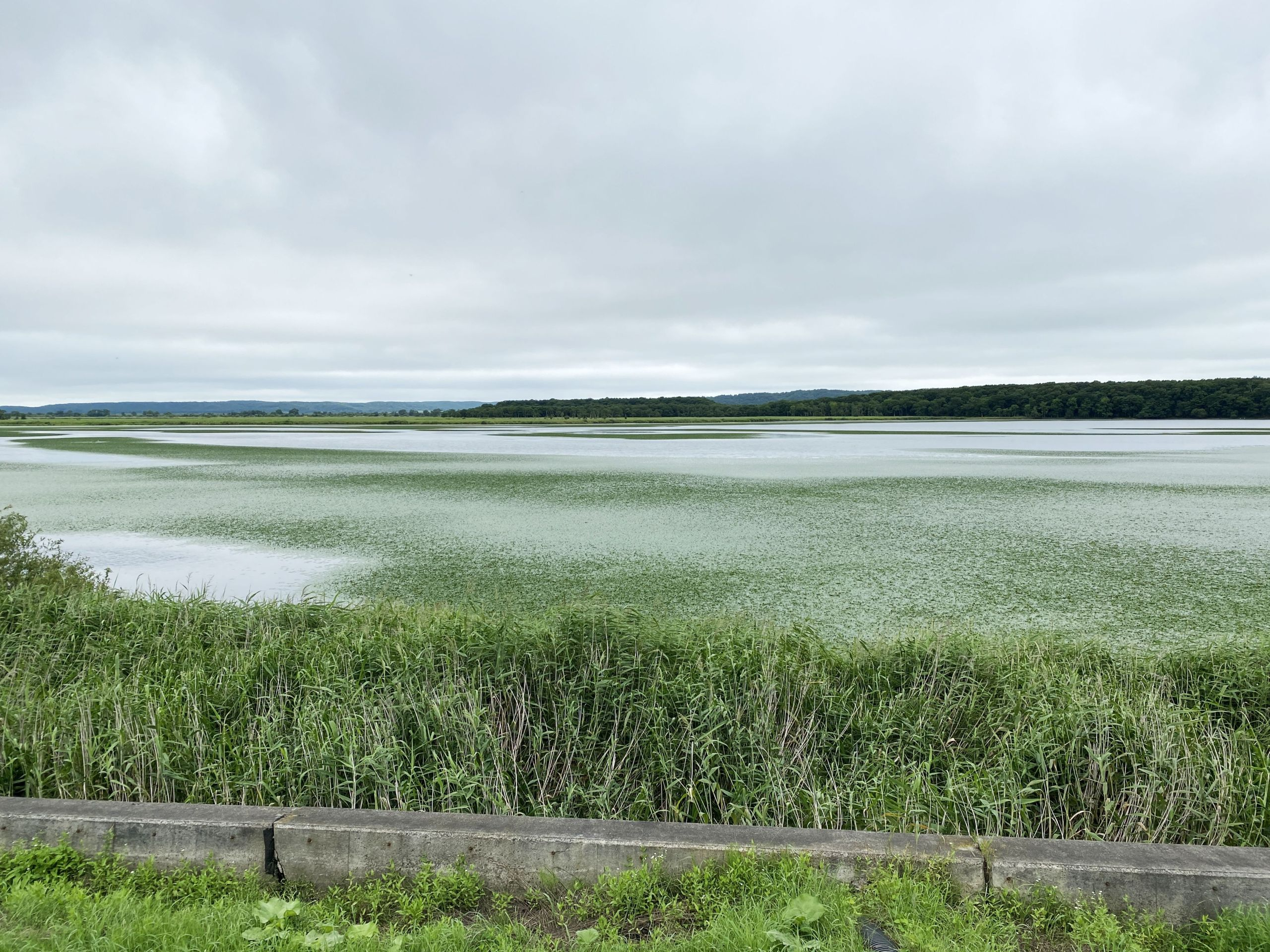
Kushiro wetlands in 2024 taken from Shibecha, Hokkaido

In December 2024, the Osaka-based energy company Japan Ecology announced plans to build a 27.3 hectares (67 acres) megasolar facility within the city limits of Kushiro. The proposed facilities would be spread across 17 locations within the city and would consist of approximately 6,600 solar panels. In a meeting with residents in February 2025, the company said that there were no white-tailed eagle nests on the proposed site. However, on March 20, Mainichi Shimbun reported that there were multiple nests at the site. In response, the Kushiro city government issued a notice prohibiting entry to the site until the end of May; Japan Ecology then halted construction of the facility near the nests. A survey of the development site conducted by the Northern Environment Research Institute on May 22 revealed that two Siberian salamander larvae were living at the site. In summer of 2025, following a drone footage of showing the forest around Kushiro-shitsugen National Park being destroyed was posted on social media, the issue gained national attention.

According to an NHK investigation in July 2025, the four municipalities in the wetland have megasolar plants. There are 30 plants in Kushiro City, six in Kushiro town, and two in both Shibecha and Tsurui.

On September 12, 2025, the president of Japan Ecology, Masanori Matsui, temporarily suspended the construction of the megasolar facility in Kushiro for one to one and a half months to discuss the future of the construction.

On December 23, 2025, Japan Ecology resumed construction in the Showa District in Kushiro City. Furthermore, it announced plans to begin construction at over 10 planned sites ahead of January 2026. According to Hokkaido Broadcasting Company (HBC), the move was believed to have been caused by the company's distrust of the city's review system, despite being required to obtain a mayor's permit before further installation within the city.

== Reaction and response ==
=== Residents and environmental groups ===
Many environmental groups and local citizens have expressed concerns about the growing number of megasolar power plants in the wetlands. On March 17, 2023, nine environmental groups, including the Kushiro Wetland Nature Regeneration Council and the Nature Conservation Society of Kushiro, submitted a request to the city government of Kushiro asking for measures to be taken against the growing number of megasolar facilities in the Kushiro wetlands. On May 9, 2025, six groups, including the Nature Conservation Society of Kushiro, presented Kushiro Mayor Hidenori Tsuruma with a 67,000-signature petition calling for a halt to construction of the Japan Ecology facility.

=== Government ===
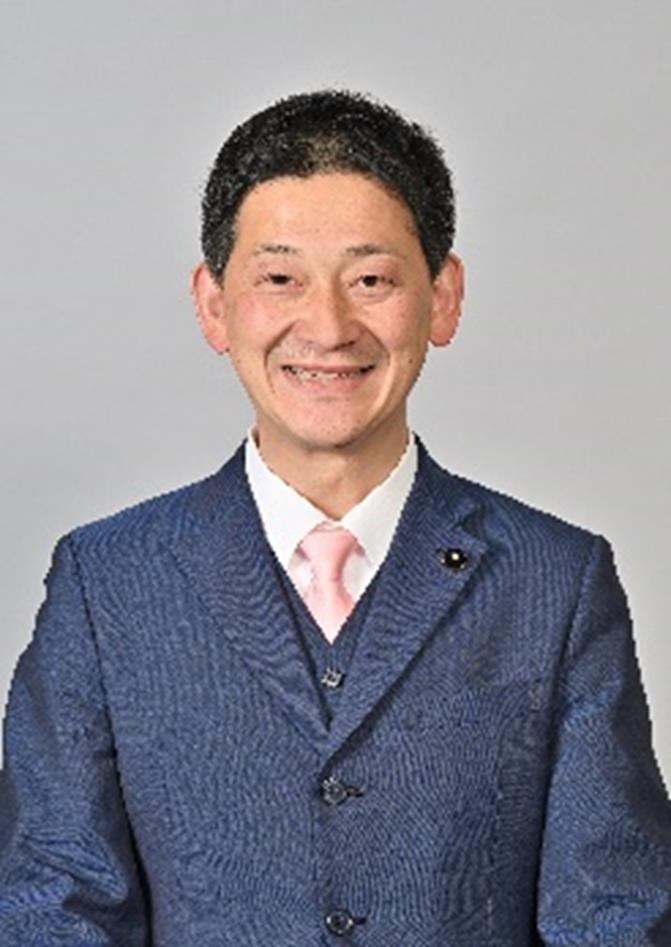
Hidenori Tsuruma, the mayor of Kushiro City

The Kushiro city government established guidelines for the installation of new solar panels in 2023. Since his election in October 2024, Kushiro Mayor Hidenori Tsuruma has been in favor of restricting development in the Kushiro wetlands, along with 20 of the 24 members of the city assembly. The assembly plans to create an ordinance to allow them to approve or deny construction in the area. On May 30, 2025, Tsuruma issued a "No More Megasolar" declaration (ノーモアメガソーラー宣言, Nō Moa Megasōrā Sengen) stating that he does not want any further construction in the area.

On September 5, 2025, Hokkaido governor Naomichi Suzuki recommended that Japan Ecology stop construction and questioned the company for proceeding without obtaining permission, as is required by the Forestry Act. He also announced an investigation into the approximately 1,200 alleged illegal forest clearings reported in the area to allow for megasolar construction.

On September 9, Liberal Democratic Party members in the National Diet, along with the Minister of the Environment Keiichiro Asao, visited and inspected the site. They said they want to balance the utilization of renewable energy with environmental protection through legal reform. On the same day, the Ministry of the Environment announced that it would establish a framework to curb the inappropriate construction of solar power facilities in the Kushiro wetlands. On September 11, officials from the Ministry of the Environment visited Shibecha (a town in the Kushiro wetlands), and Mayor Yoshihiko Sato requested for regulations regarding development in the Kushiro wetlands to be established.

In a meeting between Environment Minister Ishihara Hirotaka and Naomichi Suzuki on December 1, Suzuki urged the national government to strengthen regulations regarding the megasolar plants development. Following this meeting, the national government issued a plan to start in 2027, where new operators will be excluded from subsidy programs. Prime Minister Sanae Takaichi, a critic of the project, blamed the feed-in-tariff system for encouraging development in the area.

On January 15, 2026, Governor Suzuki inspected two construction sites in the city.

=== Other personalities ===
On August 18, rock star Masanori Sera expressed his concern for the construction of the megasolar farms, stating on his X post, "How is this environmentally friendly? The situation is now irreversible." (どこが地球環境に優しいのか もう取り返しのつかない状況). On September 10, Tomoka Igari, a member of the Japanese idol group Kamen Joshi, expressed her concern stating that "the megasolar construction in the area is a violation" and "should be stopped immediately". On September 14, Yūta Misaki, a Sapporo businessman, criticized the government response to the issue of megasolar plants in Tsurui, Hokkaido. He called for the government to "take responsibility in protecting nature".

== Impact ==
The issue draws attention in the research of Siberian salamander in the area. In October 2025, the Kushiro Nature Conservation Association raised ¥5.36 million (US$33,849.66) from 800 people for the research of the species.

== Investigation ==
Hokkaido Prefectural Government set out a survey on the area around the Kushiro shitsugen National Park between January 13 to 16, 2026. The result was published on March 3, 2026. According to the survey report, the harmful substances found in the area exceeds the standard value set out in the Soil Pollution Countermeasures Act with 26 specific harmful substances was detected including Arsenic, Fluorine, and Boron, which exceed the standard limit. On July 13, the Hokkaido prefectural government designated the construction site to be a Contaminated Soil Zone.

== See also ==
- Environmental issues in Japan
- Environmental effects of solar power
- Ukujima Mega Solar Plant

== Further readings ==
- Doedt, Christian; Maruyama, Yasushi (April 2023). "The mega solar Twitter discourse in Japan: Engaged opponents and silent proponents". Energy Policy. p. 113495. doi:10.1016/j.enpol.2023.113495.
