= Environmental issues in Japan =

Environmental issues arose in Japan together with industrialisation, starting in the Meiji period (1868–1912). Following a severe increase in pollution after the Second World War during the 1950s–1960s, Japan introduced environmental regulations to curb the impact of pollution on the environmental and public health.

Japan is the world's leading importer of both exhaustible and renewable natural resources and one of the largest consumers of fossil fuels.

== Historical issues ==
=== Meiji period (1868–1912) ===
One of the earliest examples was copper poisoning caused by drainage from the Ashio Copper Mine in Tochigi Prefecture, beginning as early as 1878. Repeated floods occurred in the Watarase River basin, and 1,600 hectares of farmland and towns and villages in Tochigi and Gunma prefectures were damaged by the floodwater, which contained excessive inorganic copper compounds from the Ashio mine. The local breeders led by Shōzō Tanaka, a member of the Lower House from Tochigi appealed to the prefecture and the government to call a halt to the mining operations. Although the mining company paid compensatory money and the government engaged in the embankment works of the Watarase River, no fundamental solution of the problem was achieved.

=== Environment deterioration in the 1960s ===
Current Japanese environmental policy and regulations were the consequence of a number of environmental disasters in the 1950s and 1960s that attended the high-speed economic growth associated with the Japanese economic miracle. Cadmium poisoning from industrial waste in Toyama Prefecture was discovered to be the cause of the extremely painful itai-itai disease (イタイイタイ病, Itai itai byō; "ouch ouch sickness"). Minamata City in Kumamoto Prefecture reported poisoning brought upon them by methylmercury drained from a chemical factory, a condition known as the Minamata disease. The number of casualties in Minamata is 6,500 as of November 2006.

In Yokkaichi, a port in Mie Prefecture, air pollution caused by sulfur dioxide and nitrogen dioxide emissions led to a rapid increase in the number of people suffering from asthma and bronchitis. In urban areas photochemical smog from automotive and industrial exhaust fumes also contributed to a rise in respiratory problems. In the early 1970s, chronic arsenic poisoning attributed to dust from arsenic mines occurred in Shimane and Miyazaki Prefectures.

In Kitakyushu during the 1960s, the Tobata Women's Association launched a campaign against pollution in the city, the heart of one of Japan's major industrial zones.

Environmentalist movements began to spring up around Japan in the wake of the 1960 Anpo protests, which energized a new generation of activists. These movements gained momentum as Prime Minister Hayato Ikeda's Income Doubling Plan placed a priority on economic growth at all costs, exacerbating environmental problems.

=== Introduction of pollution control regulations (late 1960s–2000s) ===
In 1969, the Consumers Union of Japan was founded to deal with health problems and false claims by companies. The National Diet session of 1970 came to be remembered as "the Pollution Diet." Responding to rising popular pressure and outrage, the Diet passed fourteen anti-pollution laws in a single session, in what was seen as a turning point in environmental policy. As a result, Japan had what were at the time the strongest set of environmental protection laws in the world.

These new laws included a Water Pollution Act and nationwide regulations of toxic discharges. The "polluter pays" principle was introduced. A national Environmental Agency, which later developed into the Ministry of Environment, was founded in 1971. National governmental expenditures on environmental issues almost doubled between 1970 and 1975 and tripled on the local government level. Business investments in clean technologies rose dramatically, too.

In the latter half of the 1970s, the Consumers Union of Japan led the opposition to nuclear power, calling for a nationwide Anti-Nuclear Power Week Campaign. This movement would continue to grow over the next several decades into a sizable anti-nuclear power movement in Japan.

In the 1990s, Japanese environmental legislation was further tightened. In 1993 the government reorganized the environment law system and legislated the Basic Environment Law (環境基本法) and related laws. The law includes restriction of industrial emissions, restriction of products, restriction of wastes, improvement of energy conservation, promotion of recycling waste, restriction of land utilization, the arrangement of environmental pollution control programs, and relief of victims and provision for sanctions. The Environment Agency was promoted to the full-fledged Ministry of the Environment in 2001, to deal with worsening international environmental problems.

In 1984 the Environmental Agency had issued its first white paper. In the 1989 study, citizens thought environmental problems had improved compared with the past, nearly 1.7% thought things had improved, 31% thought that they had stayed the same, and nearly 21% thought that they had worsened. Some 75% of those surveyed expressed concern about endangered species, shrinkage of rain forests, expansion of deserts, destruction of the ozone layer, acid rain, and increased water and air pollution in developing countries. Most believed that Japan, alone or in cooperation with other industrialized countries, had the responsibility to solve environmental problems. In the 2007 opinion poll, 31.8% of people answered that environmental conservation activity leads to economic development, 22.0% answered pro-environmental activity does not always obstruct the economy, 23.3% answered environmental conservation should be prioritized even if it may obstruct the economy and 3.2% answered economic development should be placed ahead of environmental conservation.

The OECD's first Environmental Performance Review of Japan was published in 1994, which applauded the nation for decoupling its economic development from air pollution, as the nation's air quality improved while the economy thrived. However, it received poorer marks for water quality, as its rivers, lakes and coastal waters did not meet quality standards. Another report in 2002 said that the mix of instruments used to implement environmental policy is highly effective and regulations are strict, well enforced and based on strong monitoring capacities.

In the 2006 environment annual report, the Ministry of Environment reported that ongoing major issues are global warming and preservation of the ozone layer, conservation of the atmospheric environment, water and soil, waste management and recycling, measures for chemical substances, conservation of the natural environment and participation in international cooperation.

== Current issues ==
=== Waste management ===
Japan burns close to two thirds of its waste in municipal and industrial incinerators. In 1999, some experts estimated 70 percent of the world's waste incinerators were located in Japan. Combined with incinerator technologies of the time, this caused Japan to have the highest level of dioxins in its air of all G20 nations. In 2019, technological progress had brought the problem of dioxins under control, no longer posing a major threat. In 2001, the US Department of Justice brought suit against Japan for the deaths of U.S. service-members at Naval Air Facility Atsugi caused by a nearby waste incinerator known as Jinkanpo Atsugi Incinerator. This has called into question the Japanese government line that the thousands of incinerators in Japan are safe.

=== Climate change ===
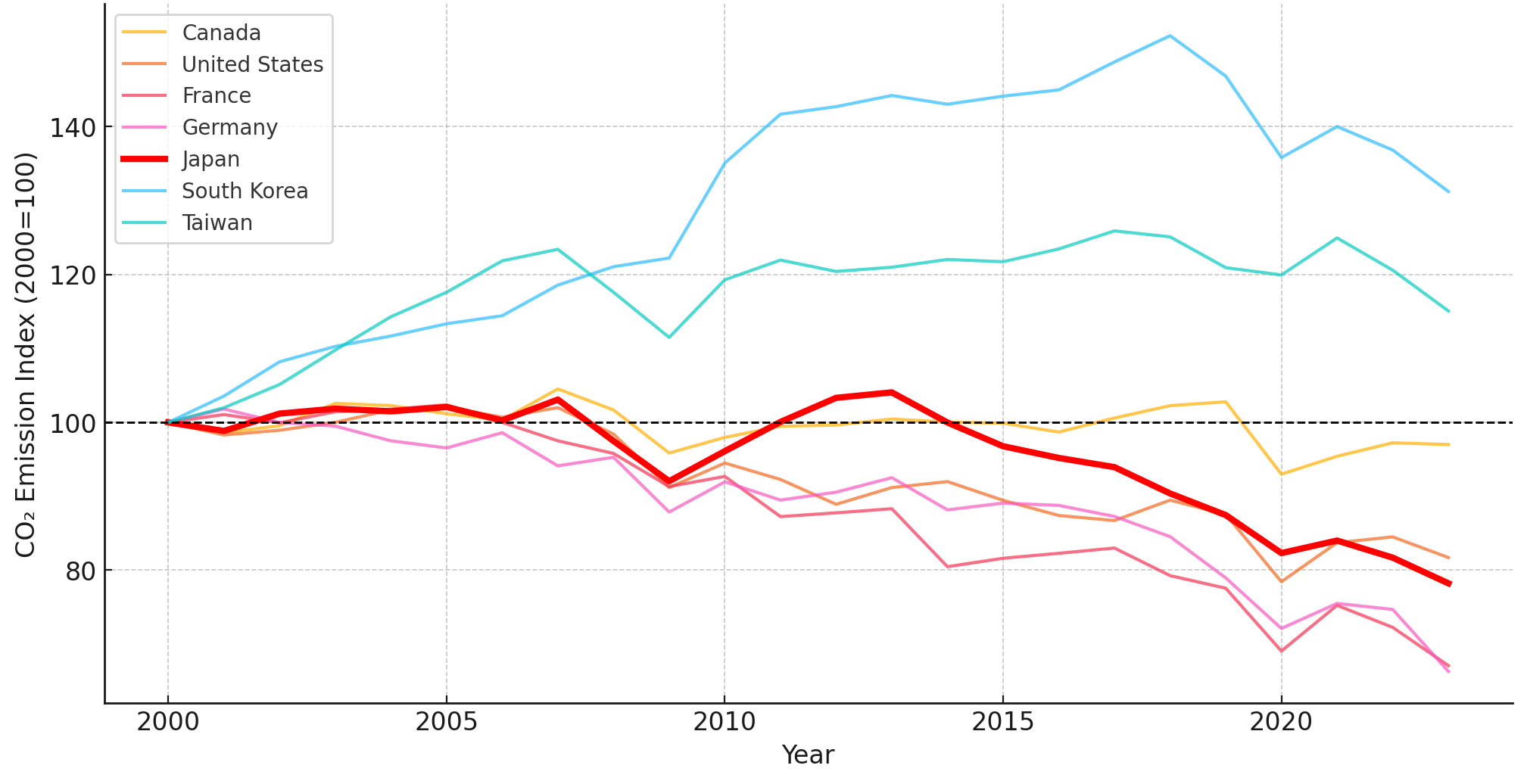
Japan and other countries' carbon emissions between 2000 and 2023: Japan has reduced its emissions by 22% since 2000.

Climate change is impacting the human population and environment of Japan. In recent years, the country has observed notable changes in its climate patterns, with rising temperatures serving as a prominent indicator of this phenomenon. The nation experiences a broad range of climates, spanning from the frigid winters of Hokkaido to the subtropical climates of Okinawa. Changes in temperature patterns have the potential to disrupt ecosystems, impact agricultural productivity, modify water resources, and pose significant challenges to infrastructure and human settlements.

=== Nuclear power ===
Japan maintains one-third of its electric production from nuclear power plants. While a majority of Japanese citizens generally supported the use of existing nuclear reactors, since the nuclear accident at the Fukushima Daiichi nuclear power plant on 11 March 2011, this support seems to have shifted to a majority wanting Japan to phase out nuclear power. Former Prime Minister Naoto Kan was the first leading politician to openly voice his opposition to Japan's dependence upon nuclear energy and suggested a phasing out of nuclear energy sources towards other sources of renewable energy. Objections against the plan to construct further plants has grown as well since the 11 March earthquake and tsunami which triggered the nuclear melt down of three reactors at the Fukushima Daiichi plant in Eastern Japan.

The treatment of radioactive wastes also became a subject of discussion in Japan. New spent-nuclear-fuel reprocessing plant was constructed in Rokkasho in 2008, the site of the underground nuclear-waste repository for the HLW and LLW has not yet been decided. Some local cities announced a plan to conduct an environmental study at the disposal site, but citizens' groups strongly oppose the plan.

=== Fishery and whaling ===
In Japanese diets, fish and its products are more prominent than other types of meat, so much so that fish consumption in Japan has been noted to be the highest in the world at times. In a fact sheet released by the FAO in 2010, it highlighted that with the exception of 2007, Japan has been the leading importer of fish and fishery products since 1970s. Even in today's market, Japan, is the third largest single market in the world for fish and fish products. It is estimated as of 2008 that Japan consumes 81 percent of the world’s fresh tuna. These reasons are why Japan has some of the most overfished waters in the world.

By 2004, the number of adult Atlantic Bluefin Tuna capable of spawning had plummeted to roughly 19 percent of the 1975 level in the western half of the ocean. Japan has a quarter of the world supply of the five big species: bluefin, southern bluefin, bigeye, yellowfin and albacore. As of 2005, more than ten species faced serious stock depletion. Moreover, the authorities has started to implement stock rebuilding plans for mackerel, snow crab, sailfin sandfish, Japanese anchovy, tiger puffer, and several other species, as stock diminished to depletive measures. These stock rebuilding plans were essential, because data shown by Japan's Ministry of Agriculture, Forestry and Fisheries highlights that mackerel stocks in the northern Sea of Japan were around 85,000 tonnes compared to 800,000 tonnes or so in the 1990s.

However, because of the depletion of ocean stocks in the late 20th century and government intervention, Japan's total annual fish catch has been diminishing rapidly. Government policy that has been implemented include The Total Allowable Catch System (TACs). This was ratified by the Japanese government and a law simply known as the TAC law came into place on 14 June 1996, which essentially sets quotas on the amount that fisheries are allowed to catch, together this coupled with the stock rebuilding plans is slowly reversing years of overfishing that has happened in Japanese waters.

Whaling for research purposes continued even after the moratorium on commercial whaling in 1986. This whaling program has been criticized by environmental protection groups and anti-whaling countries, who say that the program is not for scientific research.

=== Urban planning ===
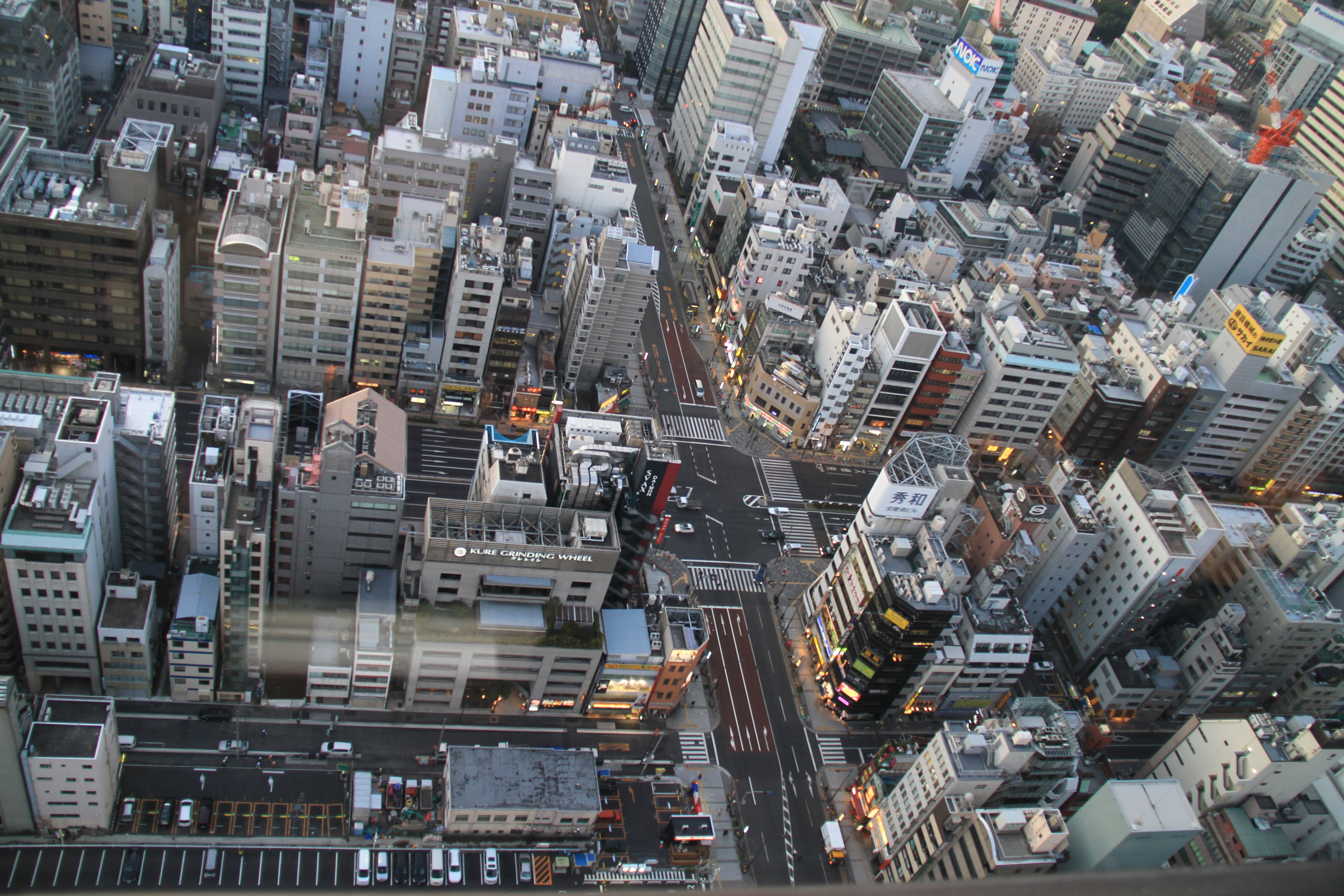
Densely packed buildings in Hamamatsucho, Tokyo

The massive nationwide rebuilding efforts in the aftermath of World War II, and the development of the following decades, led to even further urbanization and construction. The construction industry in Japan is one of its largest, and while Japan maintains a great many parks and other natural spaces, even in the hearts of its cities, there are few major restrictions on where and how construction can be undertaken. Alex Kerr, in his books "Lost Japan" and "Dogs & Demons", is one of a number of authors who focuses heavily on the environmental problems related to Japan's construction industry, and the industry's lobbying power preventing the introduction of stricter zoning laws and other environmental issues.

=== Forests ===
Japan had a 2018 Forest Landscape Integrity Index mean score of 5.8/10, ranking it 95th globally out of 172 countries.

== See also ==
- List of environmental issues
- Environmental movement
- Winter storms of 2009–10 in East Asia
- Kushiro Wetlands megasolar issue
