= Ukujima Mega Solar Plant =

Photovoltaic power stations in Japan

The Ukujima Mega Solar Plant project in Japan will be one of the world's largest photovoltaic power generation facilities at 480 MW(DC) and 400 MW(AC) respectively.

It is located on the island of Ukujima (33.27011°N 129.11171°), administratively to Sasebo City, Nagasaki Prefecture.

The project has been originated and developed by Photovolt Development Partners GmbH (PVDP) starting in 2012. In December 2018 a consortium of local companies formed by Kyudenko Corporation (renamed "KRAFTIA Co., Ltd." since October 2025) acquired the project.

== History ==
The project started in 2012 with the aim of helping to contribute to environmental protection and economic revitalization on the island. The land area for the project covers more than 800 hectares of largely unused land. To facilitate the project a special purpose company TeraSol G.K. was established, which signed more than 11,000 individual lease agreements with around 1250 landowners. The land registry had to be updated in many cases and owners to be located throughout Japan.

In March 2013, the project obtained the METI approval, qualifying for participation under the Japanese Act on Special Measures concerning the Procurement of Renewable Electric Energy by Operators of Electric Utilities (the "RENA") with a feed-in tariff as FY 2012 project.

The first application for grid connection was filed with Kyushu Electric Power in March 2013. In July 2016 the project finally obtained Grid Connection Application approval from Kyushu Electric Power for a direct current, high voltage submarine transmission system based on VSC technology from Siemens.

Subsequent permits and authorization were obtained and the start of construction was scheduled for Q1 of 2020.

The project was successfully developed by PVDP and subsequently Kyudenko Corporation because of, among other factors, the strong support from local communities, most notably local residents and the City of Sasebo.

After acquiring the majority interest in the project, the consortium formed by Kyudenko Corporation established a new special purpose company, Ukujima Future Energy Holdings G.K., which assumed all rights and obligations related to the project from TeraSol G.K. and is becoming the legal owner and operator of the solar park.

On 28 April 2020, Kyocera Corporation issued a press release confirming an investment of JPY 50 billion (approx. USD 466 million) by the consortium to finance the construction of the project. The entire investment costs are around JPY 200 billion (approx EUR 1,48 billion).

At the end of 2022, accommodation for around 200 workers was completed on Ukujima, and up to 1,000 workers will gradually move in after January 2023. Preparation work has already begun on Ukujima in January 2023, such as control facilities of the current and voltage during the power transmission via the submarine cable (total length of 64 km) between Ukujima and Kyushu Islands, as well as disaster prevention work to build a regulating pond to prevent damages from heavy rainfall. The full construction will begin in spring 2024 and the electricity sales are planned to take place during the Japanese fiscal year 2025, however the progress of the construction work has been delayed from the original schedule of Japanese fiscal year 2023 and is expected to be completed around the beginning of Japanese fiscal year 2027. The construction progress is managed by Kyudenko Cooperation in an appropriate manner and worked earnestly to secure the understanding of interested parties, including the fishery cooperative, while seeking feedback and guidance from local government and other stakeholders, primarily through Ukujima Mirai Energy LLC, which is leading the project. As of May 2025, the negotiation of SPC Financing are ongoing. Kyudenko Cooperation aims for early execution of the loan agreement, and the specific timing and interest cost of the loan will be determined as soon as receiving the approval to lay the submarine cable. The land lease agreement for the HVDC building of Kyushu Mainland has been completed. The permission for submarine cable has been obtained from Sasebo City and discussions are currently underwas with Nagasaki Prefecture.

== Power generation ==
The project is designed around a 33 kV circular network connecting different construction sites on the island and feeding electricity into a high-voltage transformer for step up to 220 kV. The connection to the grid network of Kyushu Electric Power is at Ainoura substation located in Sasebo city, Nagasaki Prefecture through the 64 km HVDC submarine cable. The original design provided by Siemens was subsequently changed by the consortium to another manufacturer (GE). Extensive studies have been undertaken by Toshiba to study the effects on the grid using both VSC and conventional, alternating current connections. The results indicated that both connection methods would be feasible. However, due to the application status and ongoing grid connection study by Kyushu Electric, it was decided to continue with VSC technology, despite higher construction costs. A number of seabed investigations had to be undertaken and consent from local fishermen had to be obtained.

As parts of the construction sites are located on agricultural land, PVDP has asked the Fraunhofer Institute for Solar Energy Systems ISE in Freiburg, southern Germany to simulate the effects of shadowing on the growth of biomass and to design an agri-photovoltaic system that would both satisfy the requirements of METI for the use of such land and local farmers’ needs.

To cope with challenging topography, proximity to sea and high wind speeds PVDP undertook various simulations to propose a workable design for the solar installations and adjacent high voltage equipment, that were forming the basis for approvals obtained by Kyudenko Cooperation as a designated engineering, procurement and construction (EPC) company for the construction of the project.

== See also ==
- List of photovoltaic power stations
- Kushiro Wetlands megasolar issue
