= Pollution Diet =

The "Pollution Diet" (公害国会, kōgai kokkai) was the 64th extraordinary session of Japan's National Diet, which sat from 24 November to 18 December 1970. It is commonly known as the "Pollution Diet" because legislators passed 14 bills that completely transformed Japan's pollution control regime.

== History ==
Severe pollution came to plague Japan during its post-Second World War economic boom, when rapid industrial development resulted in a surge of emissions. By the late 1960s, there was growing discontent about the lack of government action to control pollution. Businesses were anxious about the impact of protests on their industrial activities; the governing Liberal Democratic Party (LDP) was concerned that public anger could result in electoral defeat.

To address this problem, Prime Minister Eisaku Satō created the Central Pollution Countermeasures Conference in August 1970, which would draft a battery of legislation to tackle the issue. The Pollution Diet was summoned in November 1970 to vote on these bills; by taking decisive action, the LDP aimed to excise the threat posed by further unrest. During this brief session, which sat from 24 November to 18 December 1970, 14 pollution control bills were passed into law, creating a strict regulatory regime. The speed of this legislative salvo was unprecedented anywhere in the world; overnight, Japan was transformed from a country with meagre environmental regulations, to one of the strictest in the OECD. Notably, the legislation enacted the "polluter pays principle", which holds that polluters are financially responsible for the damage they cause.

With the Diet's approval, Satō would create the Environmental Agency to administer the legislation's implementation on 24 May 1971.

== Adopted bills ==
Important bills passed during the Pollution Diet include:

- Polluter Financial Responsibility Law
- Pollution Crime Punishment Law
- Water Pollution Prevention Law
- Revision of the 1967 Basic Law for Environmental Pollution Control

Removal of a clause that specified that pollution control measures must be carried out "in harmony with the healthy development of the economy".

- Revision of the Air Pollution Prevention Law
- Revision of the Natural Park Law
- Revision of the Poisonous Material Control Law
- Revision of the Agricultural Chemical Control Law
- Revision of the Waste Disposal Law
