= Ukujima =

Small Japanese island off Kyushu island

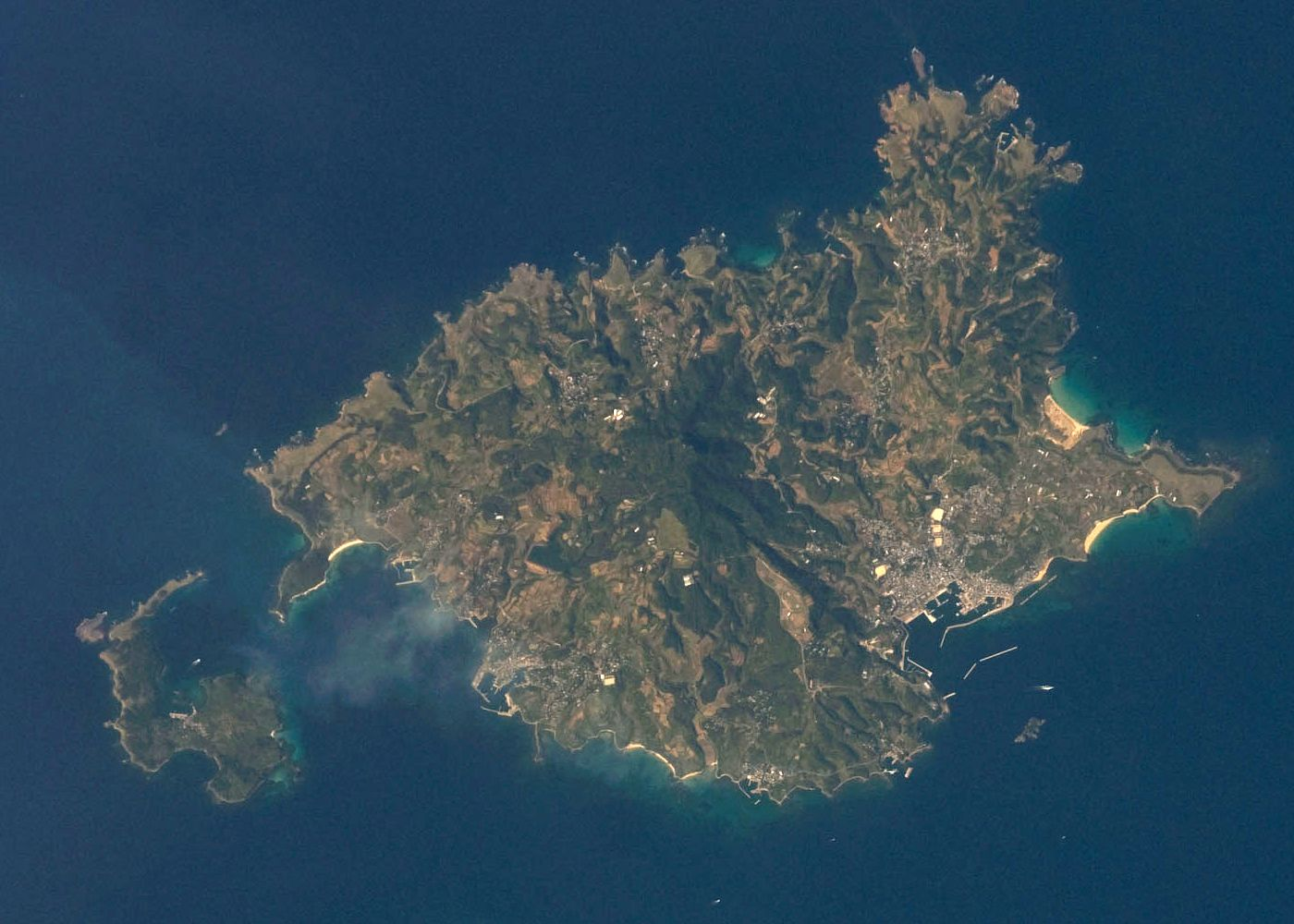

Geography
- Location: Gotō archipelago
- Coordinates: 33°16′11″N 129°06′46″E
- Area: 24.93 km^{2} (9.63 sq mi)
- Highest elevation: 258 m (846 ft)
- Highest point: Shirogatake (城ヶ岳)

Demographics
- Population: 1645 (1 October 2024)

Additional information
- Official website: http://www.ukujima.com/

Ukujima (宇久島 (Japanese), also called Uku Island) is an island in the northernmost part of the Gotō archipelago, about 50 km west of the mainland of Kyushu, Japan. It is administratively part of Sasebo City, Nagasaki Prefecture. The entire island lies within Saikai National Park.

== Overview ==
Ukujima is a remote island formed roughly 1,900,000 years ago from the volcanic eruptions of Mount Shirogatake. Its main industries are fishery and livestock raising, with a historical whaling industry that has since faded. Like many islands in rural Japan, it has seen a significant and steady population decline, from a high of nearly 12,000 since 1955 to 2,187 residents in 2015. Like the neighboring island of Ojika, Ukujima previously had significant resources of shellfish and seaweeds in the surrounding coasts that were collected by both professional fishers and community residents alike. However, these have been significantly depleted and a lack of replacement of aging fishers by the younger generation has threatened the continuity of the industry on the island.

According to the oral history of Ukujima, in 1187, following the loss of the Battle of Dan-no-ura, Taira-no-Iemori of the Taira clan, younger brother of Taira no Kiyomori, landed on the island at an inlet known as Funakakushi (舟隠し, the boat-hiding) and established rule over the island, later becoming known as Uku Iemori. Generations of the Taira clan were buried at Tōkōji, a temple in the center of the island known for its distinctive red gate.

During the early period of the Tokugawa shogunate, the two fishing districts, Taira and Kōnoura were under the control of the Fukue domain, along with the rest of the Gotō islands, excluding Ojika. The two districts differed in their primary fishing products, i.e. Taira was the center of commercial abalone fishing. However in the 17th century, Kōnoura, the area with the oldest commercial port on the island, fell under the authority of a new domain, the Tomie han, and resisted re-merging with the Fukue domain.

In 1889 the two municipalities, the town of Taira (平町) and the village of Kōnoura (神浦村) merged to form the town of Uku with an elected mayor and town councillors. The boundaries of the town of Uku (宇久町) also included the neighboring Terashima, or Temple Island, and the uninhabited Nezumishima, or Mouse Island.

Due to financial burdens and the promotion of municipal mergers in Japan, the town of Uku merged with the city of Sasebo in 2006. The functions of the councillors and town government were eliminated and replaced by a branch office the Sasebo municipal government. In 2016, the district self-governing council (地区自治協議会) was established to increase decision-making abilities for island residents on island-specific issues, such as road maintenance.

The northernmost point in the Gotō islands is Tsushimasehana Lighthouse (対馬瀬鼻灯台), located on the northeastern tip of Ukujima.

== Economics ==
With the motorization of fishing boats in the early 20th century, fishers from Ukujima and Ojika began to expand their activities into the adjacent areas of China and the Korean peninsula. In 1952, the South Korean government claimed new marine borders in order to protect its sovereignty. As a result, Japan's large-scale fisheries began to decline.

Like many other islands, the fishers of Ukujima are organized into groups known as Fisheries Cooperative Associations (FCA), which were the principal beneficiaries of fishery-related financial aid from the federal government. In the 1940s, Ukujima had four independent FCAs - these have since decreased and been consolidated into the Ojika-Ukujima FCA, now headquartered on Ojika. In 2005, the Remote Island Fishery Aid (RIFA) was established, and 144 fishing-affiliated households on Ukujima signed contracts to promote and improve the health of the surrounding waters, such as removing sea urchins, laying spawning beds for squids, and conducting beach clean-ups.

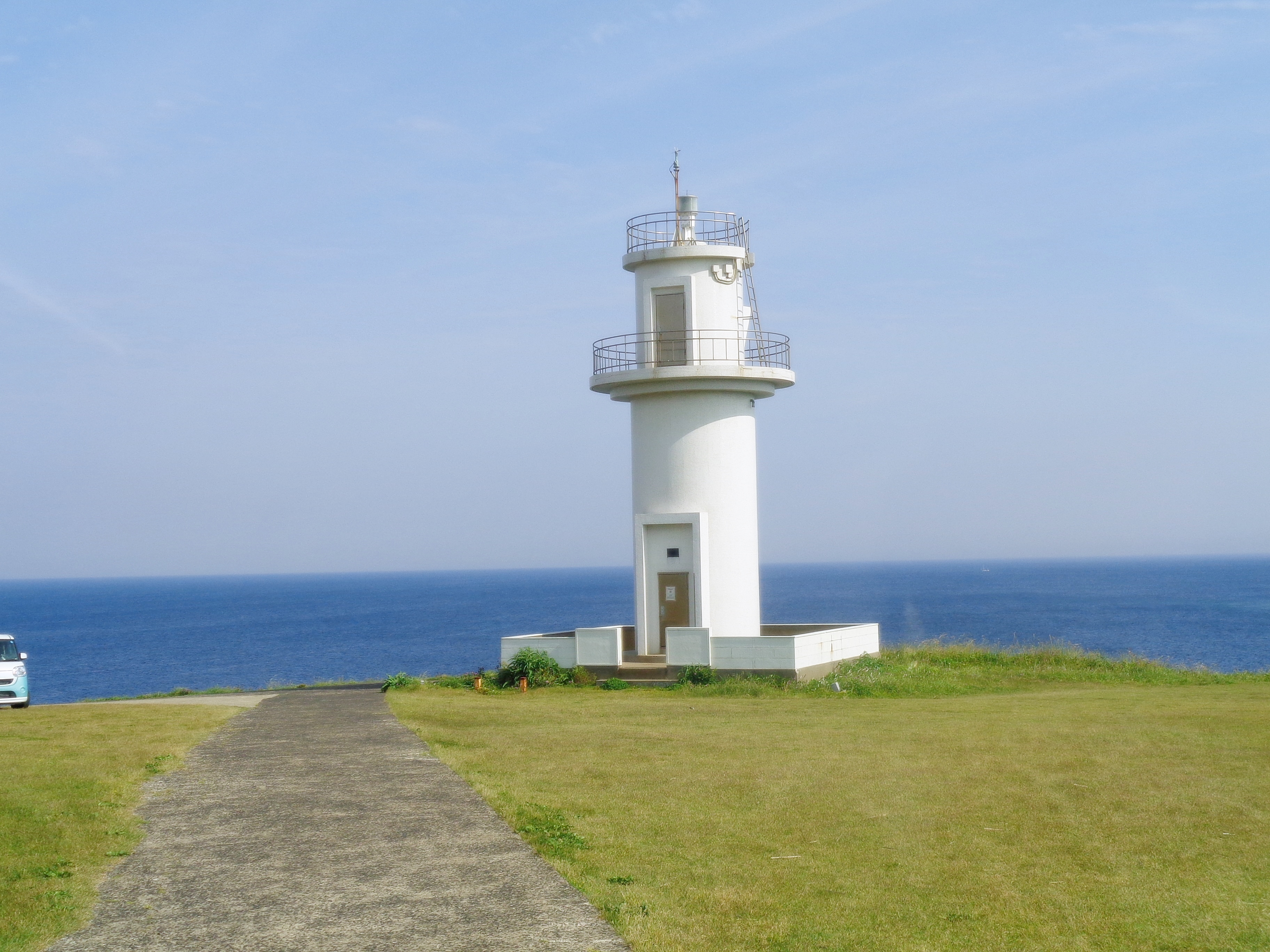
Tsushimasehana lighthouse

Ukujima is the site for the in-development Ukujima Mega Solar Plant, a joint venture between a German and a Japanese energy company.

== Culture ==
Like many communities in Japan, Ukujima holds a number of festivals such as the local Gion festival, the annual festival for Uku Shrine, and the New Year's Eve Festival. There are also festivals specifically to celebrate local vegetables and seaweeds, such as the Nobiru festival (野蒜祭り, a type of wild onion) and the Hijiki festival (鹿尾菜祭り, a type of seaweed). The Hiyohiyo festival, celebrated at Itsukushima Shrine, is a festival for fishermen that takes place at sea.

One of the major shrines of the island, Uku Shrine, was established in 1570.
