= Solar power in Japan =

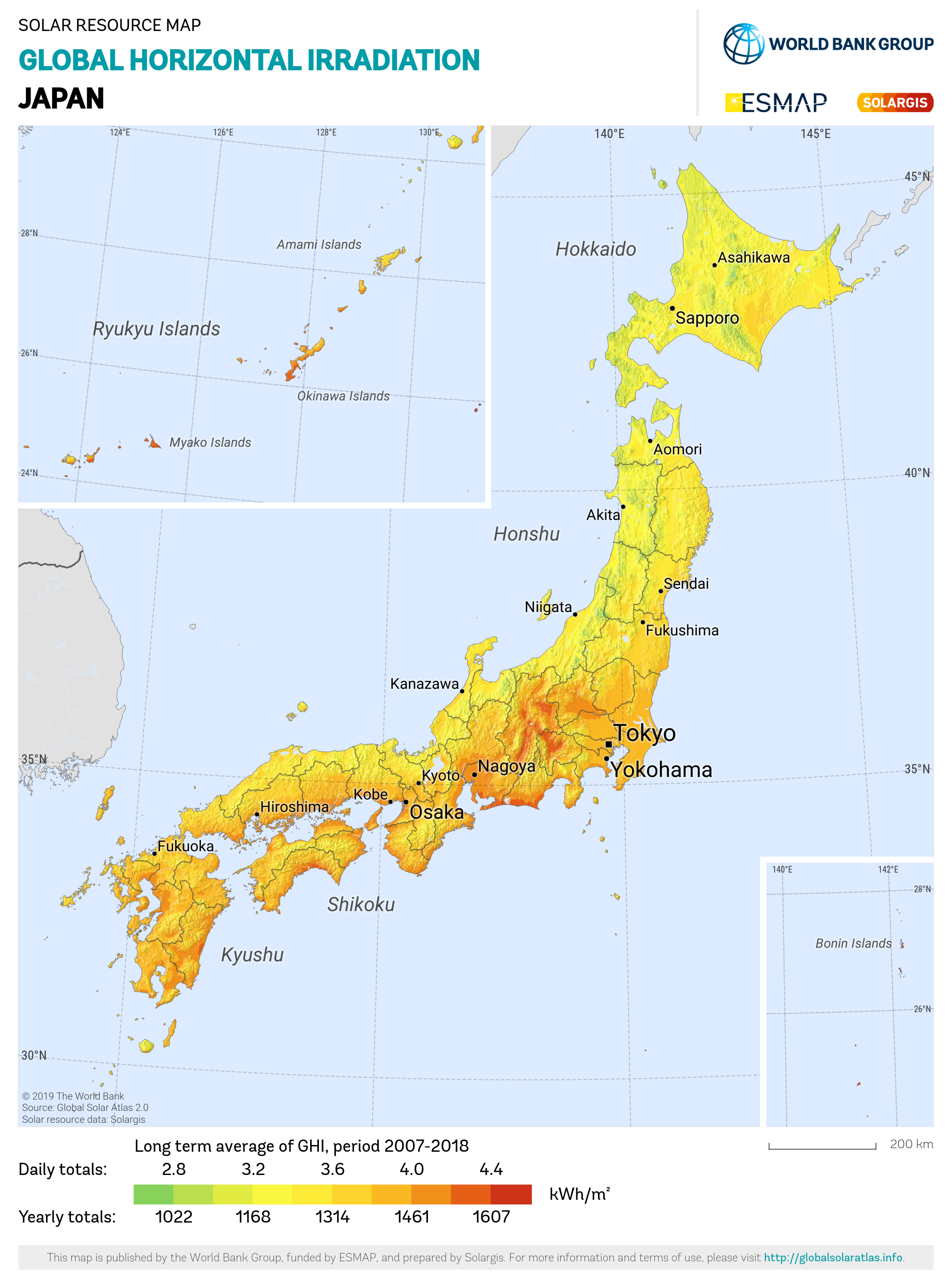
- Solar irradiation map of Japan
- Installed capacity: 91 GW (2024) (4)
- Annual generation: 102 TWh (2024)
- Capacity per capita: 744 W (2024)
- Share of electricity: 13% (2024)

Solar power in Japan has been expanding since the late 1990s. Japan is a large installer of domestic PV systems, with most of them grid connected. The country was a major manufacturer and exporter of photovoltaics (PV), with a global market share of around 50% in the early 2000s. However, by 2019, this had dropped to below 1% due to the rise of state-backed production in China.

With almost no domestic oil and gas reserves, Japan began investing heavily in research and development of renewable energy and energy conservation following the 1973 oil crisis. The Sunshine Project (1973–1992) explored the potential of solar power, geothermal power, liquefied coal, and hydrogen as primary energy sources. In 1992, during the early years of commercial PV installation, Japan accounted for 27.8% of global PV production, and by 2004, this had risen to 50.4%. Although conventional PV is no longer mass-produced in the country, Japan has been investing in perovskite solar cell technology in recent years, a technology invented by Tsutomu Miyasaka. Commercial production of perovskite cells in Japan is expected to begin by 2027.

Solar power has become an important national priority since the country's shift in policies toward renewable energy after the Fukushima nuclear accident in 2011. Japan was the world's second largest market for solar PV growth in 2013 and 2014, adding a record 6.97 GW and 9.74 GW of nominal nameplate capacity, respectively. By the end of 2017, cumulative capacity reached 50 GW, the world's second largest solar PV installed capacity, behind China. In line with the significant rise in installations and capacity, solar power accounted for 9.9% of Japan's national electricity generation in 2022, up from 0.3% in 2010. By the end of 2025, cumulative installed capacity had reached approximately 102 GW, with solar power accounting for about 9.8–10% of Japan’s national electricity generation (up from 0.3% in 2010 and 9.9% in 2022). Japan remained the world’s fourth-largest generator of solar electricity.

== Solar manufacturing industry ==
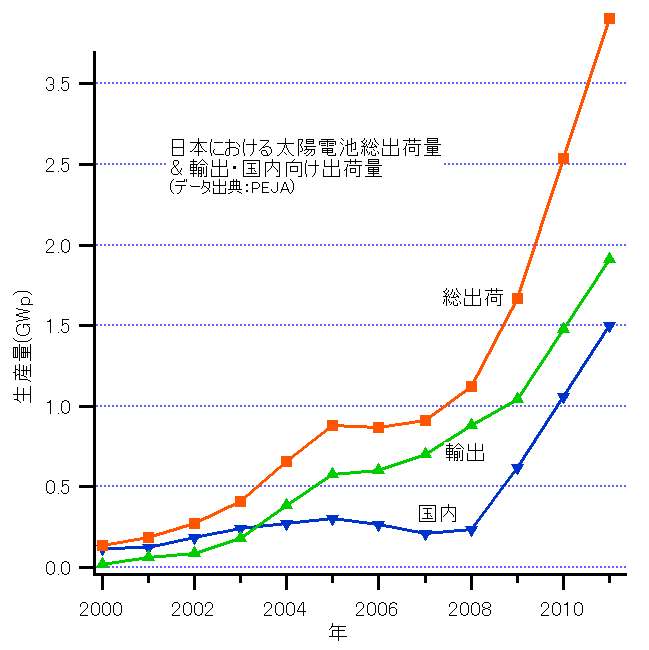
Japanese solar cell production (in GW) Total Export Domestic

In the 2000s, Japanese manufacturers and exporters of photovoltaics included Kyocera, Mitsubishi Electric, Mitsubishi Heavy Industries, Sanyo, Sharp Solar, Solar Frontier, and Toshiba. However, these manufacturers had stopped mass-producing PV by 2019.

During the Reagan administration in the United States, oil prices decreased, and the US removed most of its policies that supported the solar industry. Government subsidies were higher in Japan (as well as Germany), which prompted the solar industry supply chain to begin moving from the US to those countries.

By the early 2010s, Japanese companies had lost most of their global market share in conventional crystalline-silicon photovoltaics to Chinese manufacturers, who rapidly scaled production with lower costs and strong government support. Domestic mass production of silicon solar cells and modules in Japan largely ceased. Remaining Japanese activity in conventional PV shifted mainly to overseas factories (particularly in China and Southeast Asia) to higher- value system integration, specialized products, and research.

As of the mid 2020s, Japan relies heavily on imports for the solar modules installed domestically. The majority of modules come from China, with a significant secondary share from Southeast Asian countries. Japanese branded modules sold in Japan are also frequently manufactured abroad.

In response, the Japanese government and industry have prioritized next generation technologies, especially lightweight and flexible perovskite solar cells, as a route to rebuild domestic manufacturing capability and reduce supply chain dependence. A notable example is Sekisui Chemical's government supported project to mass produce perovskite solar films, with initial production targeted for 2027 at a facility in Osaka and a goal to reach gigawatt scale capacity later in the decade.

Separately, some Japanese companies have established or acquired manufacturing capacity abroad. One example of is Nippon Energy, a Tokyo based solar EPC company, which in 2025 announced plans for a 1 GW heterojunction (HJT) solar module factory in Dubai. The company said it had acquired an existing solar panel manufacturing unit in the city, and intended to upgrade it for high efficiency HJT production, aligning the project with the UAE's renewable energy goals and objectives of COP28.

== Government action ==
=== Feed-in tariff ===
The Japanese government is seeking to expand solar power by enacting subsidies and a feed-in tariff (FIT). In December 2008, the Ministry of Economy, Trade and Industry announced a goal of 70% of new homes having solar power installed, and would be spending $145 million in the first quarter of 2009 to encourage home solar power. The government enacted a feed-in tariff in November 2009 that requires utilities to purchase excess solar power sent to the grid by homes and businesses and pay twice the standard electricity rate for that power.

On June 18, 2012, a new feed-in tariff was approved, of 42 Yen/kWh. The tariff covers the first ten years of excess generation for systems less than 10 kW, and generation for twenty years for systems over 10 kW. It became effective July 1, 2012. In April 2013, the FIT was reduced to 37.8 Yen/kWh. The FIT was further reduced to 32 Yen/kWh in April 2014.

In March 2016, a new feed-in tariff was approved for electricity generated by photovoltaic power. The Procurement Price Calculation Committee compiled and publicized recommendations concerning the FY 2016 purchase prices and the periods to which they apply. Respecting the recommendations, METI finalized these as follows:

- Non-household customers (10 kW or more): reduced from 27 yen/kWh to 24 yen/kWh.
- Household customers (10 kW or less) was reduced from 33 yen/kWh to 31 yen/kWh when generators are not required to have output control equipment installed. When generators are required to have output control equipment installed the price was reduced from 35 yen/kWh to 33 yen/kWh.

Residential PV feed-in tariffs for systems below 10 kW were updated in 2017 to values between JPY24/kWh to JPY28/kWh depending on the circumstances. These were due to remain unchanged until 2019.

The most recent FIT only concerns non-residential solar power plants. The new non-residential FIT was due to reduce in 2017 from JPY21/kWh in 2017 to JPY18/kWh for facilities certified in and after April 2018.

=== Targets ===
The government set solar PV targets in 2004 and revised them in 2009:

- 28 GW of solar PV capacity by 2020
- 53 GW of solar PV capacity by 2030
- 10% of total domestic primary energy demand met with solar PV by 2050

The targets set for 2020 were surpassed in 2014, and the target for 2030 was surpassed in 2018.

As of July 2021, Japan was aiming at 108 GW of solar capacity by 2030. In May 2021, the Japanese Trade Ministry said that Japan may require up to 370 GW of solar capacity by 2050 to reach the goal of cutting carbon emissions to zero.

Under the Seventh Strategic Energy Plan (Cabinet Decision, February 2025), solar PV is positioned as Japan’s largest power source by FY2040, targeting a 23-29% share of electricity generation (corresponding to roughly 200-280 GW AC installed capacity). The 2030 cumulative capacity target range is approximately 103.5-117.6 GW AC (or 129-146 GW DC depending on conversion). The Japan Photovoltaic Energy Association (JPEA) projects ~150 GW (125 GW AC) by 2030 in its PV Outlook 2050. Longer-term JPEA scenarios under carbon-neutrality assumptions cite figures around 386-400 GW by 2050.

== Statistics ==
Installed PV capacity (in MW)
Year end	Total capacity	Yearly installation	Share of national electricity demand
1992	19.0	n/a	
1993	24.3	5.3	
1994	31.2	6.9	
1995	43.4	12.2	
1996	59.6	16.2	
1997	91.3	31.7	
1998	133	41.7	
1999	209	76	
2000	330	121	
2001	453	123	
2002	637	184	
2003	860	223	
2004	1,132	272	
2005	1,422	290	
2006	1,709	287	
2007	1,919	210	
2008	2,144	225	
2009	2,627	483	
2010	3,618	991	0.34%
2011	4,914	1,296	0.49%
2012	6,632	1,718	0.67%
2013	13,599	6,967	1.19%
2014	23,339	9,740	2.22%
2015	34,150	10,811	3.35%
2016	42,040	8,600	4.07%
2017	49,500	7,000	5.02%
2018	56,162	6,500	5.65%
2019	63,192		6.44%
2020	71,868		7.51%
2021	78,413		8.14%
2022	83,057		8.75%
2023	87,068		9.57%
2024	89,601		9.51%
2025	92,211		9.81%
Source: EPIA and IEA-PVPS. All nominal capacity figures are reconverted from W_{AC} to W_{p}.			

Yearly installation – Annually installed PV capacity in megawatts since 1992
Total capacity – Cumulative installed PV capacity in megawatts since 1992
Module prices of residential solar pv in Japan 1992–2015 (JPY/W). Source: iea-pvps.org.

== See also ==
- Energy in Japan
- Kushiro wetlands megasolar issue
- Japanese reaction to Fukushima Daiichi nuclear disaster
- List of renewable energy topics by country and territory
- Solar power by country
