= Noma =

Noma, NoMa, or NOMA may refer to:

== Places ==
- NoMa, the area North of Massachusetts Avenue in Washington, D.C., US
  - NoMa–Gallaudet U station, on Washington Metro
- Noma, Florida, US
- NOMA, Manchester, a redevelopment in England
- Noma District, Ehime, a former district in Iyo Province, Japan
- Noma Station, Mihama, Aichi, Japan

== People ==
=== Given name ===
- Noma, a diminutive of the Russian name Avtonom
- Noma Noha Akugue (born 2003), German tennis player
- Noma Bar (born 1973), Israeli-British artist
- Noma Buthelezi, South African politician
- Noma Copley (1916–2006), American art collector and jewelry designer
- Noma Dumezweni (born 1969), Swazi-British actress
- Noma Gurich (born 1952), American judge
- Noma Shepherd (1935–2023), New Zealand community leader
- Noma Sio-Faiumu (born 1950s), Samoan event coordinator

=== Surname ===
- Akiko Noma (born 1980), Japanese musician
- Akinori Noma, Japanese electrophysiologist
- Hiroshi Noma (1915–1991), Japanese author
- Nicolas Amougou Noma (1947–2004), Cameroonian politician
- Ryota Noma (born 1991), Japanese footballer
- Sawako Noma (1943–2011), Japanese publisher
- Seiji Noma (1878–1938), Japanese writer and publisher
- Takayoshi Noma (born 1993), Japanese baseball player
- Takeshi Noma (born 1958), Japanese politician
- Takeshi Noma (politician, 1934–2023), Japanese politician

== Arts, entertainment, and media ==
- Noma Prizes, Japanese literary awards
  - Noma Award for Publishing in Africa

== Biology ==
- Archipsocus nomas, a barklouse of the family Archipsocidae
- Euxoa nomas, a moth of the family Noctuidae
- Noma pony, a Japanese pony breed

== Brands and enterprises ==
- NOMA (company), US lighting manufacturer
- Noma (restaurant), Copenhagen, Denmark

== Healthcare ==
- Noma (disease), an often fatal infection of the mouth and face
- Noma neonatorum, similar to noma (disease) in newborn infants

== Organizations ==
- New Orleans Museum of Art, US
- National Organization of Minority Architects, US professional organization
- Noma Dōjō, Tokyo, Japan

== Other uses ==
- Noma (のま), a Kanji iteration mark
- NOMA or Non-overlapping magisteria, a viewpoint about science and religion
- USS Noma (SP-131), a patrol craft 1917–1919
- 5G § NOMA (non-orthogonal multiple access), a telecommunications technology

== See also ==
- Gnoma, a genus of longhorn beetles
