= Dojo =

Place for immersive learning, experiential learning or meditation

Dōjō
- "Dōjō" in kanji

Japanese name
- Kanji: 道場
Transcriptions
- Romanization: dōjō

A dōjō (道場; Japanese pronunciation: [doꜜː(d)ʑoː] (Note: Also [doː(d)ʑoː].)) is a hall or place for immersive learning, experiential learning, or meditation. This is traditionally in the field of martial arts. The term literally means "place of the Way" in Japanese.

== History ==
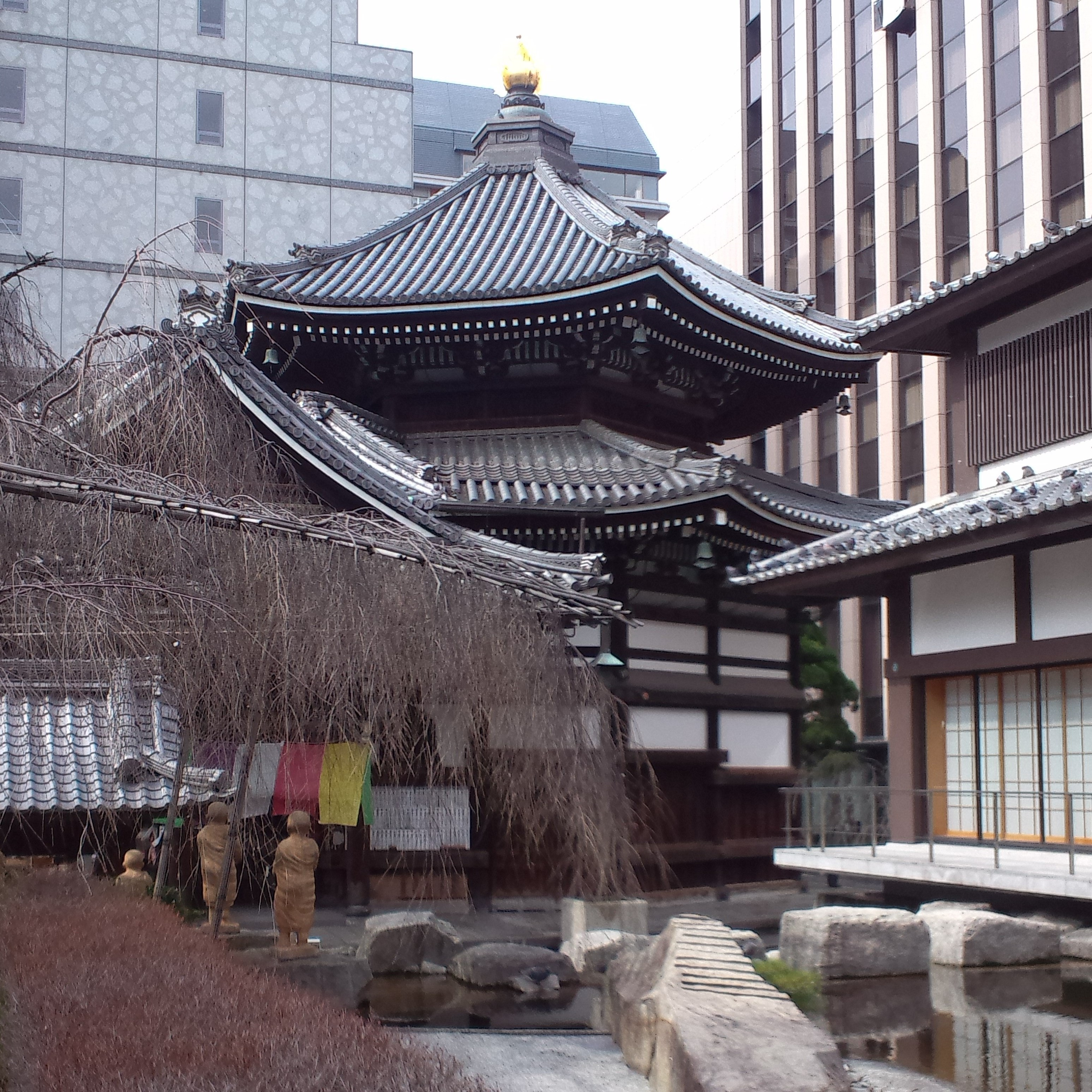
The Ikenobō dōjō (right) next to Rokkaku-dō, Kyoto

The word dōjō originates from Buddhism. Dōjōs were often adjunct to temples and were formal training places for any of the Japanese arts ending in "-dō", from the Chinese Dao, meaning "way" or "path". Sometimes meditation halls where Zen Buddhists practice zazen meditation were called dōjō.

The alternative term zen-do is more specific, and more widely used. European Sōtō Zen groups affiliated with the International Zen Association prefer to use dōjō instead of zendo to describe their meditation halls as did their founding master, Taisen Deshimaru.

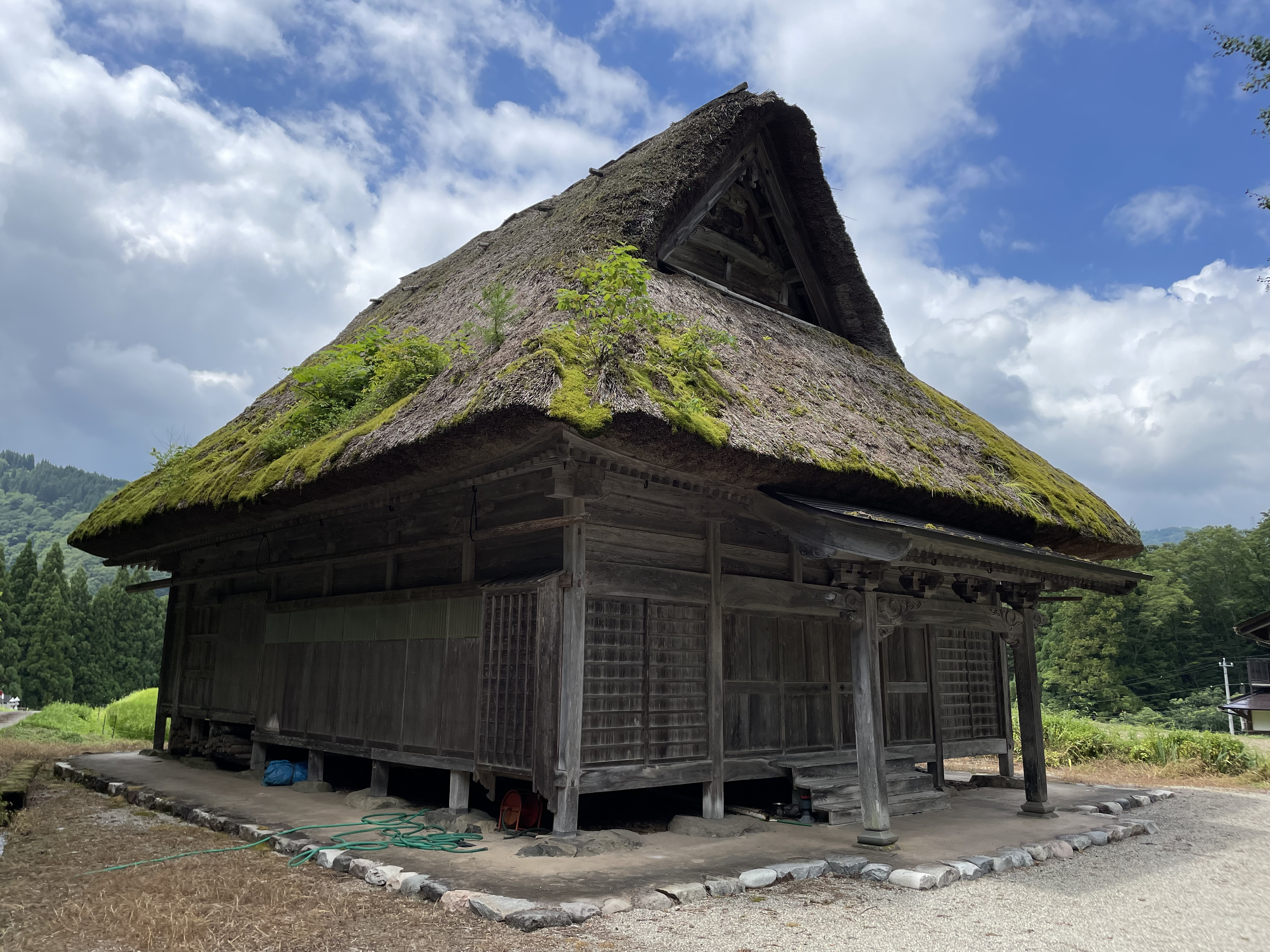
An old Jōdo Shinshū Buddhist dōjō in Toyama Prefecture

Other Buddhist traditions also sometimes met in private dōjōs which were not part of a temple. For example, the Jōdo Shinshū school initially began as networks of dōjōs where followers of all classes would meet. These were usually small buildings, often private residences turned into chapels for religious chanting of the nembutsu and other monthly services. Rather than complex altars, they used vertical scrolls with calligraphy as the main object of worship.

In Japan, any facility for physical training may be called a dōjō. In the Western world, the term dōjō (when related to physical activity) is used exclusively for Japanese martial arts such as aikidō, jūdō, karate-dō, etc.

== In martial arts ==
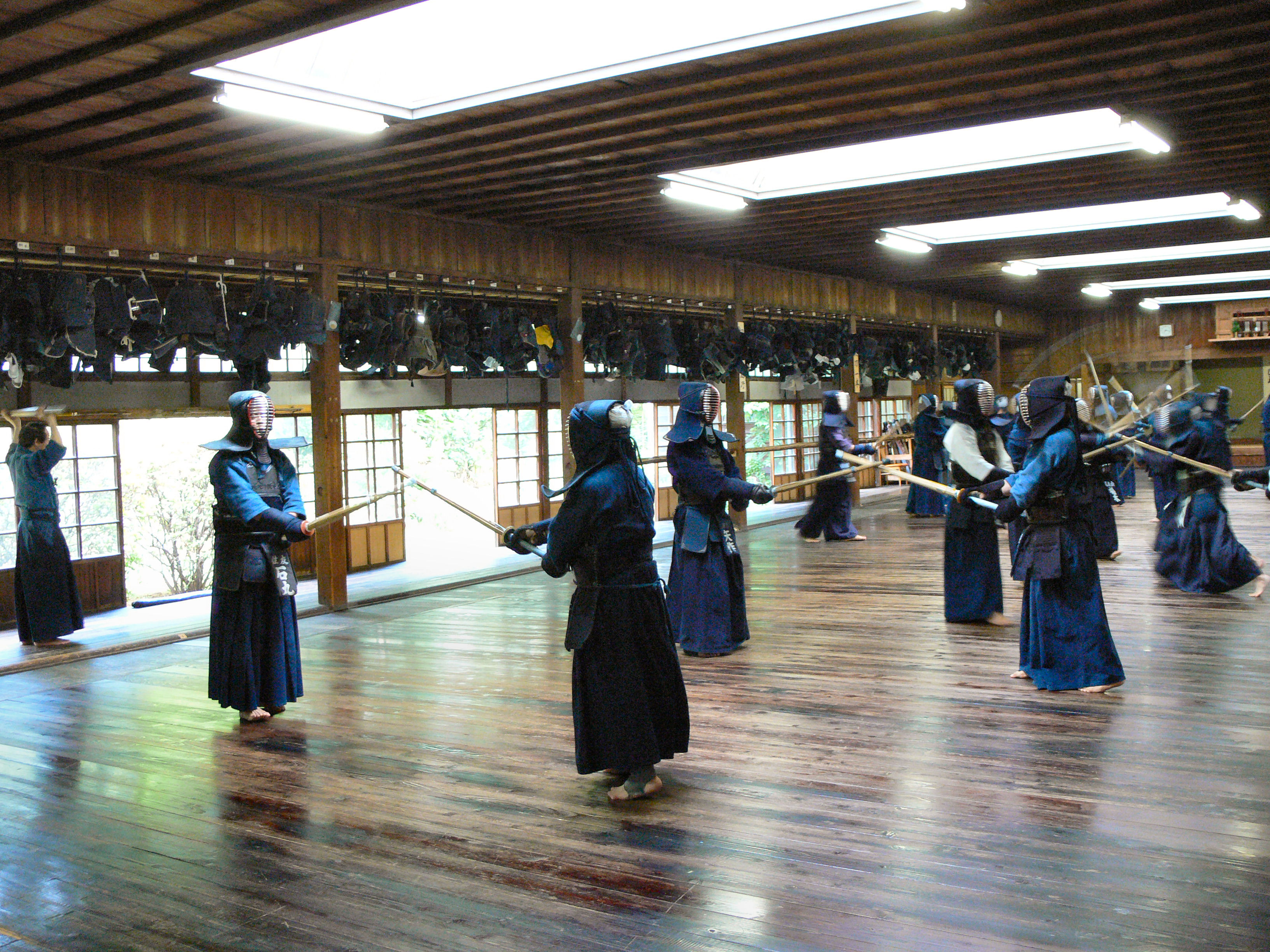
A kendō dōjō, Tokyo

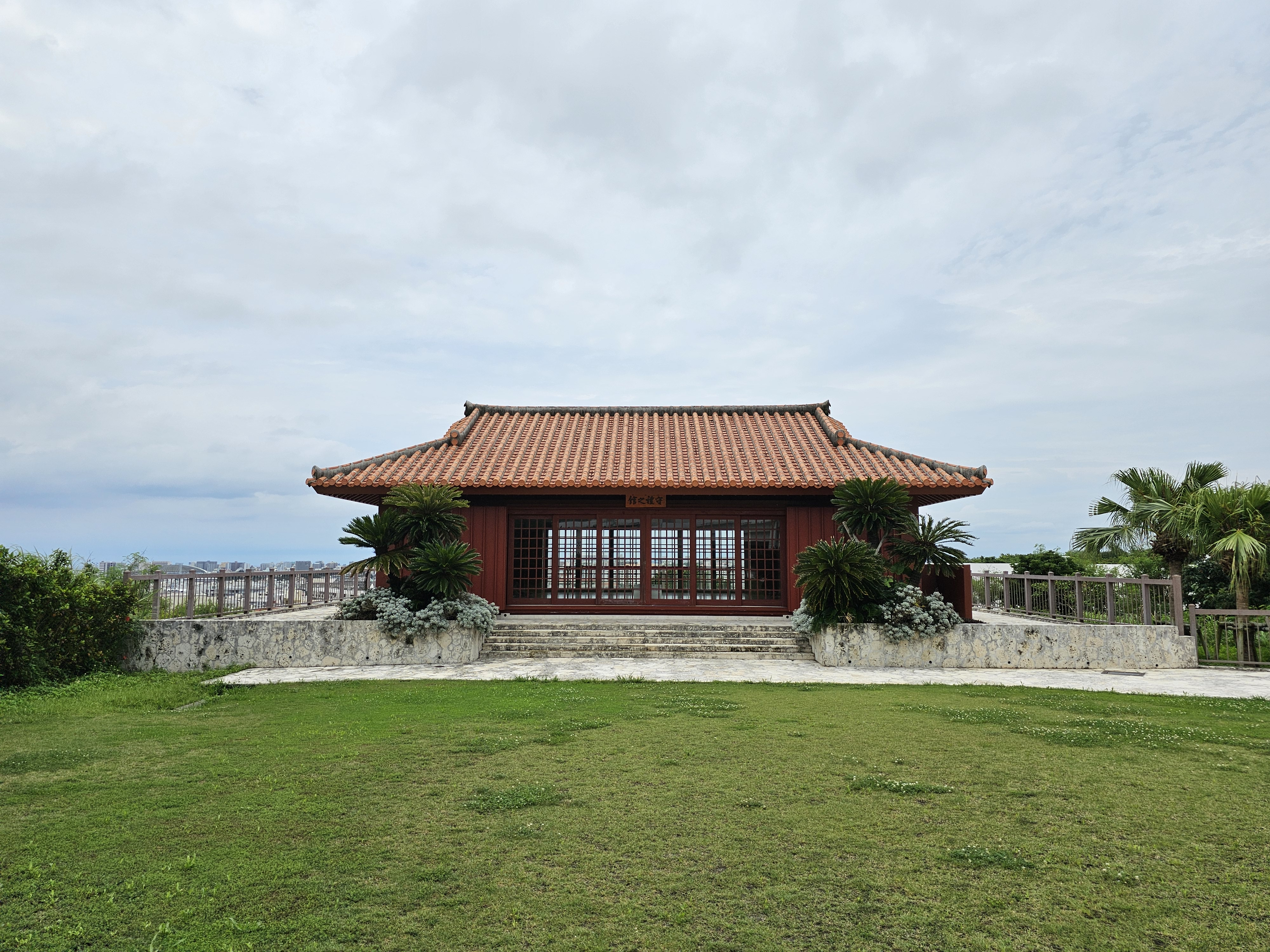
Traditional Dojo – Shurei no yakata, Karate Kaikan – in Tomigusuku near Naha, Okinawa Prefecture, Japan

A proper Japanese martial arts dōjō is considered special and is well cared for by its users. Shoes are not worn in a dōjō, which is in line with the Japanese custom to keep the premises clean and respectable. In many styles it is traditional to conduct a ritual cleaning (sōji; 掃除) of the dōjō at the beginning and/or end of each training session. Besides the obvious hygienic benefits of regular cleaning it also serves to reinforce the fact that dōjō are supposed to be supported and managed by the student body (or by special students, e.g., uchi-deshi). In some cases, the instructional staff may choose to help the students clean, as a sign of modesty, setting a personal example. In Modern Times, even when a school has a Dojo to train inside of, the training may sometimes be conducted outside, often in parks.

Many traditional dōjō follow a prescribed pattern with shomen (正面; "front") and various entrances that are used based on student and instructor rank laid out precisely. The Shomen is designated as a wall, usually in the North of the Dojo and facing the entrance. Typically students will enter in the lower-left corner of the dōjō (in reference to the shomen) with instructors in the upper right corner. Shomen typically has a shelf attached to it. On the shelf would traditionally be presented a miniature Shintō shrine with a sculpture, flower arrangement, or other artifacts. Pictures of past Masters are generally found aside the shrine, and not on it. The term kamiza means "place of honor" and a related term, kamidana refers to the shrine itself. Other artifacts may be displayed throughout the dōjō, such as kanban (看板; signboard) that authorize the school in a style or strategy, and items such as taiko drums or armor (Ō-yoroi). It is not uncommon to find the name of the dōjō and the dōjō kun (roughly "dōjō rules") displayed prominently at shomen as well. Visitors may have a special place reserved, depending on their rank and station. Weapons and other training gear will normally be found on the back wall.

=== Honbu dōjō ===
A honbu dōjō (本部道場) is the central training facility and administrative headquarters of a particular martial arts style.

Some well-known dōjō located in Japan are:

- Kodokan Judo Institute (Judo)
- Aikikai Hombu Dōjō (Aikido)
- Noma Dōjō (Kendo)
- Nakazato Karate Weapons Gym (Shōrin-ryū Shōrinkan)

== Similar cultural establishments ==
In Japan and other countries, there are additional names for training halls, that are equivalent to "dōjō". These include the following:

=== Japan ===
- Heya (sumo). The name means 'Room'. As opposed to a Dojo, the Heya is a 'stable' for professional athletes. It also has its own special rules and etiquette. The attire is minimalistic, and the atmosphere is that of competitive comradery. It is also often a place where the wrestlers live, and not only train.

=== India ===
- Akhara (Indian martial arts)
- Kalari (kalaripayat)

=== Korea ===
- Dojang (Korean martial arts). This type of martial arts school is fairly similar to the Japanese variety.

=== Indonesia ===
- Gelanggang (silat Melayu)
- Sasaran (pencak silat)

=== Vietnam ===
- Võ Đường (Việt Võ Đạo).

=== Greater China ===
- Wuguan (simplified Chinese: 武馆; traditional Chinese: 武館; lit. 'martial hall'). Similarly to a Dojo, there is a Confucian-like hierarchy between the students and teachers. However, the hierarchy often more so resembles a 'family', than a bureaucracy. The altar, which only exists in some of the Wuguan, may be dedicated to past Masters, deities, or both. That is unlike in a Dojo, where the pictures of Masters are usually not placed within the shrine itself. Historically, and sometimes still in our time, this type of cultural enterprise was used as a community center. This is the opposite of many Dojos today, which join an extant community center, to become a part of it. The Wuguan is a central establishment in many kung fu movies, such as those of the Shaw Brothers company, and the films about late Wing Chun grandmaster Yip Man and martial arts folk hero Wong Fei-hong.
- Dojo/dojang is pronounced in Mandarin as daochang and Cantonese as dou cheung due to its Chinese characters used for the Japanese and Korean martial arts schools established in China, Hong Kong, Macau and Taiwan.

== In other fields ==
The term dōjō is also increasingly used for other forms of immersive-learning space.

=== Zen Buddhism ===
The term dōjō is sometimes used to describe the meditation halls where Zen Buddhists practice zazen seated meditation. The alternative term zen-do is more specific, and more widely used. European Sōtō Zen groups affiliated with the International Zen Association prefer to use dōjō instead of zendo to describe their meditation halls as did their founding master, Taisen Deshimaru.

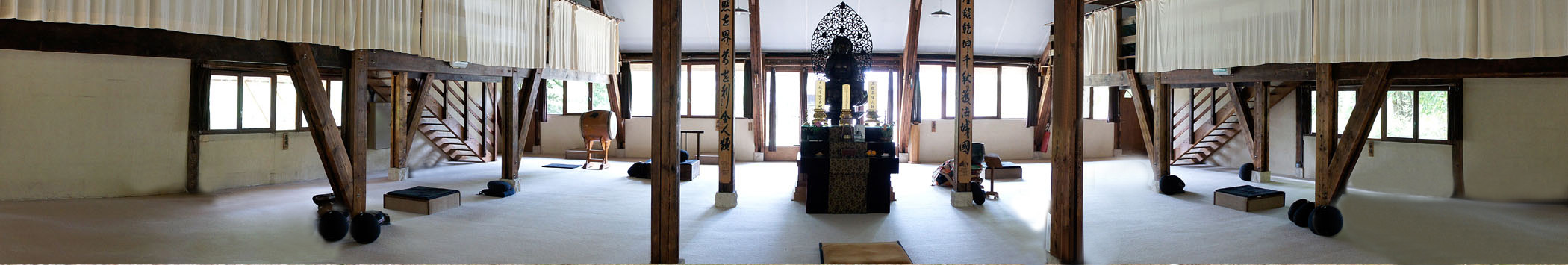
Sōtō Zen Dojo of La Gendronniére near Blois (France)

=== Japanese new religions ===
In Japanese new religions, a dōjō can be used for various purposes.

- Seicho-No-Ie: The Tobitakyū Dōjō in Chōfu, Tokyo is a branch temple that contains a shinsokan meditation hall, library, bookstore, cafeteria, administrative offices, dormitories, and all other facilities within a single building.
- Tenshō Kōtai Jingūkyō: A dōjō is a building that serves as a primary worship center. The religion's three main dōjōs are located in Tabuse, Tokyo, and Honolulu.
- Honmichi: The Hanaseyama Training Dōjō (花瀬山修道場, Hanaseyama Shū-Dōjō), located in a remote valley in the Kii Peninsula, is used to train selected youth members for three years.
- Ananaikyo: The main worship hall of Ananaikyo's headquarters in Kakegawa, Shizuoka is known as the Chinkon Dōjō (鎮魂道場), since chinkon kishin is practiced there.

=== Internet Culture ===
The term 'Dojo' has been used for various software, digital learning applications and by related companies.

== See also ==
- Bodhimaṇḍa
