= Yonosuke Nakano =

Japanese religious leader and philanthropist

- 中野 與之助
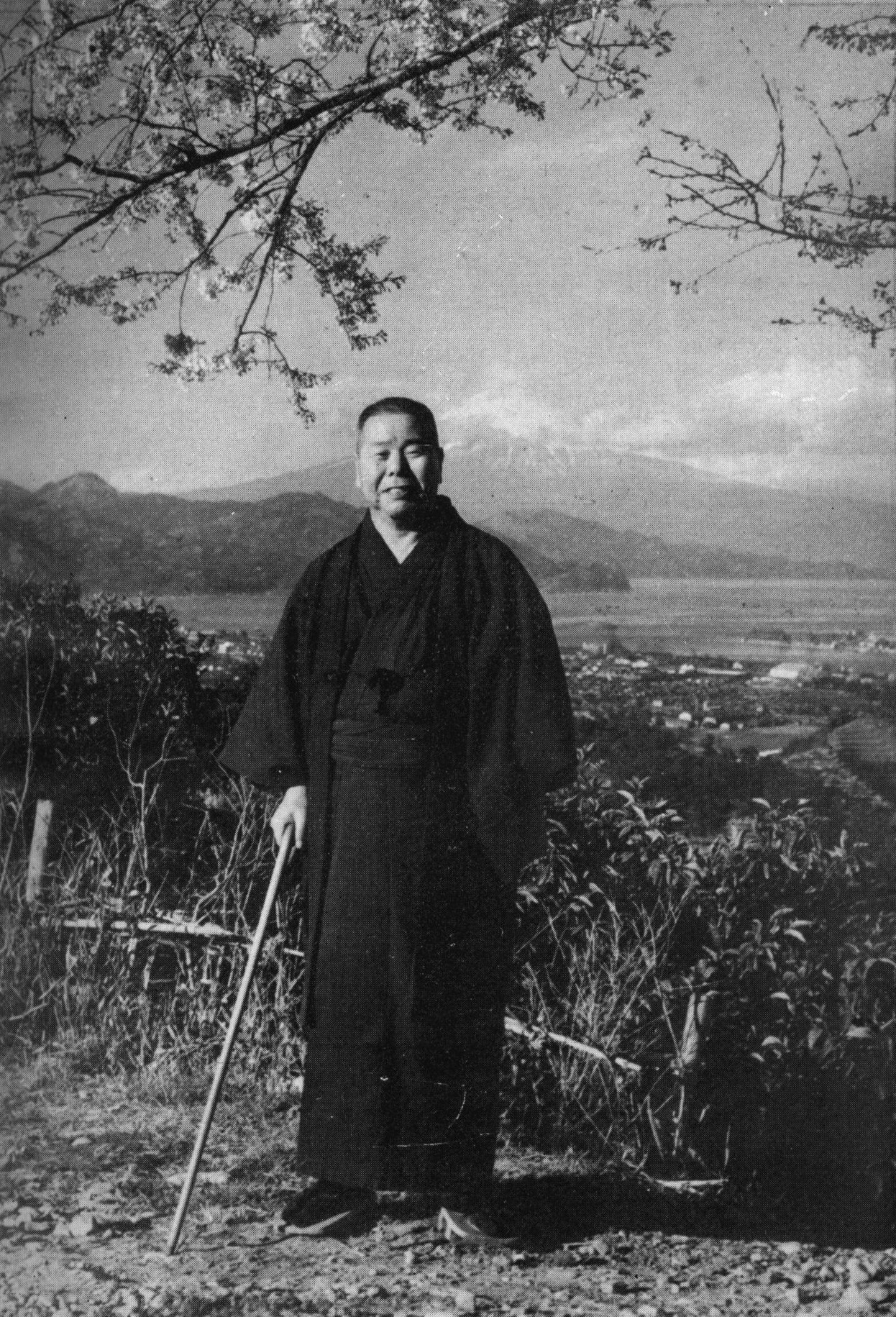
- Yonosuke Nakano during the early 1950s, with Mount Fuji in the background

Personal life
- Born: August 12, 1887 Yaizu, Shizuoka
- Died: June 24, 1974 (aged 86) Shimizu, Shizuoka
- Resting place: Ananaikyo headquarters, Kakegawa, Shizuoka; 34°41′24.3″N 137°58′44.8″E
- Home town: Shizuoka Prefecture
- Notable work: Reikai-de Mita Uchū (霊界で観た宇宙) (13 volumes)
- Known for: Founding OISCA International

Religious life
- Religion: Ananaikyo
- Initiation: September 14, 1940; Shimizu, Shizuoka by Nagasawa Katsutate (長澤雄楯)

Senior posting
- Teacher: Nagasawa Katsutate (長澤雄楯)

Yonosuke Nakano (Japanese: 中野與之助; August 12, 1887 – June 24, 1974) was a Japanese religious leader and philanthropist. He founded the Ananaikyo religion in 1949, as well as the non-profit organization OISCA International in 1961.

== Life ==
Yonosuke Nakano was born on August 12, 1887 (old lunar calendar date: July 23, 1887) in Yaizu, Shizuoka Prefecture.

In December 1929, Nakano joined the Oomoto religion. On August 25, 1931, he was appointed as an Oomoto missionary.

In 1935, Nakano was imprisoned in Kyoto as a result of the Second Oomoto Incident, during which the Japanese government imprisoned hundreds of Oomoto members in an attempt to completely eradicate Oomoto. Nevertheless, Nakano was soon released. Upon his release from prison, he went to study with Nagasawa Katsutate (長澤雄楯) (1858–1940). Nakano commuted daily from his home in Yaizu to Nagasawa's residence in Shimizu to study with him from October 1938 until Nagasawa's death on October 10, 1940. On September 14, 1940, Nakano was initiated as the successor to the official lineage of Spirit Studies (霊学, Reigaku) (or "Honda spiritualist studies" (本田霊学, Honda reigaku)) in a ceremony that lasted an entire week and was attended by four lawyers and two witnesses. Nakano learned much of Honda's philosophy from Nagasawa. Nagasawa died the next month on October 10, 1940.

Nakano diligently studied all of Nagasawa's teachings and practices, and was said to have learned everything that Nagasawa had learned for 50 years from his spiritual teacher, the Shinto priest and spirit medium Honda Chikaatsu (本田親徳) (January 13, 1822 – April 9, 1889). Nagasawa taught Nakano a type of meditation and spirit possession practice known as chinkon kishin (鎮魂帰神) (lit. 'calming the soul and returning to the divine'), which he had also directly taught to Oomoto founder Onisaburo Deguchi and Shintō Tenkōkyo founder Tomokiyo Yoshisane.

On April 4, 1949, Nakano officially founded Ananaikyo as a religious corporation in Shimizu, Shizuoka. In October 1961, he founded OISCA International. He also founded the International Foundation for Cultural Harmony (国際文化交友会, Kokusai Bunka Kōyūkai).

Nakano died in Shizuoka Prefecture on June 24, 1974. His deified spirit is enshrined in an auxiliary shrine (34°41′24.3″N 137°58′44.8″E) just east of the Ananaikyo headquarters' main worship hall, the Chinkon Dōjō (鎮魂道場).
