= Nagasawa Katsutate =

Japanese Shinto priest (1858–1940)

- 長澤雄楯
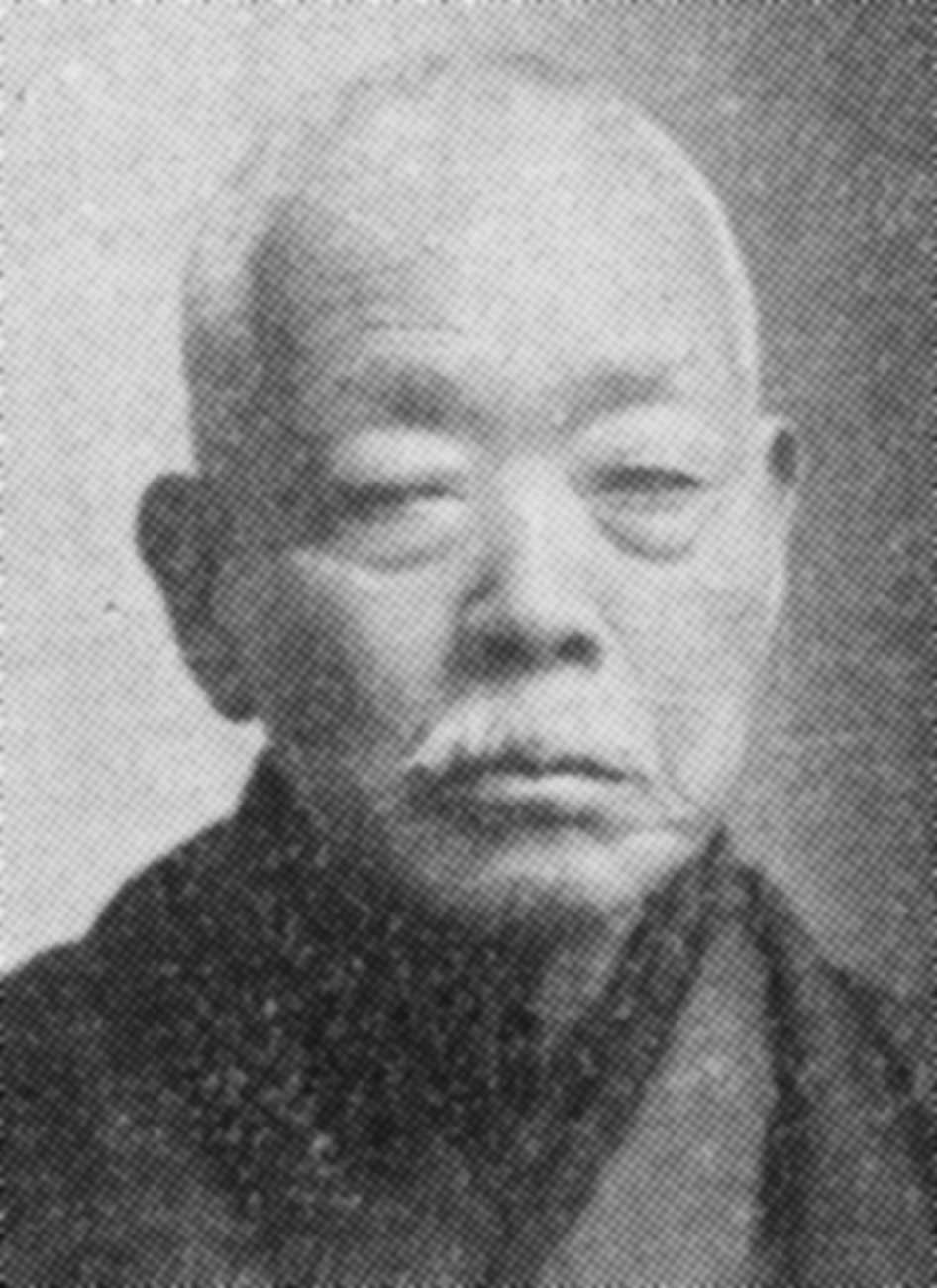
- Nagasawa Katsutate

Personal life
- Born: 14 September 1858 Shimizu, Shizuoka
- Died: October 10, 1940 (aged 82) Shimizu, Shizuoka
- Resting place: Baiin Zen Temple (梅蔭禅寺, Baiin Zen-ji), Shimizu, Shizuoka; 35°00′18″N 138°29′11″E
- Home town: Shimizu, Shizuoka
- Parents: Nagasawa Shinzaemon (新左工門) (father); Nagasawa Toyoko (新左豊子) (mother)
- Notable work(s): Kamigakari hyakushu (神憑百首) (1934); Kannagara (惟神)
- Known for: Chinkon kishin

Religious life
- Religion: Shinto

Senior posting
- Teacher: Honda Chikaatsu
- Successor: Nakano Yonosuke
- Students: Deguchi Onisaburo; Tomokiyo Yoshisane; Nakano Yonosuke

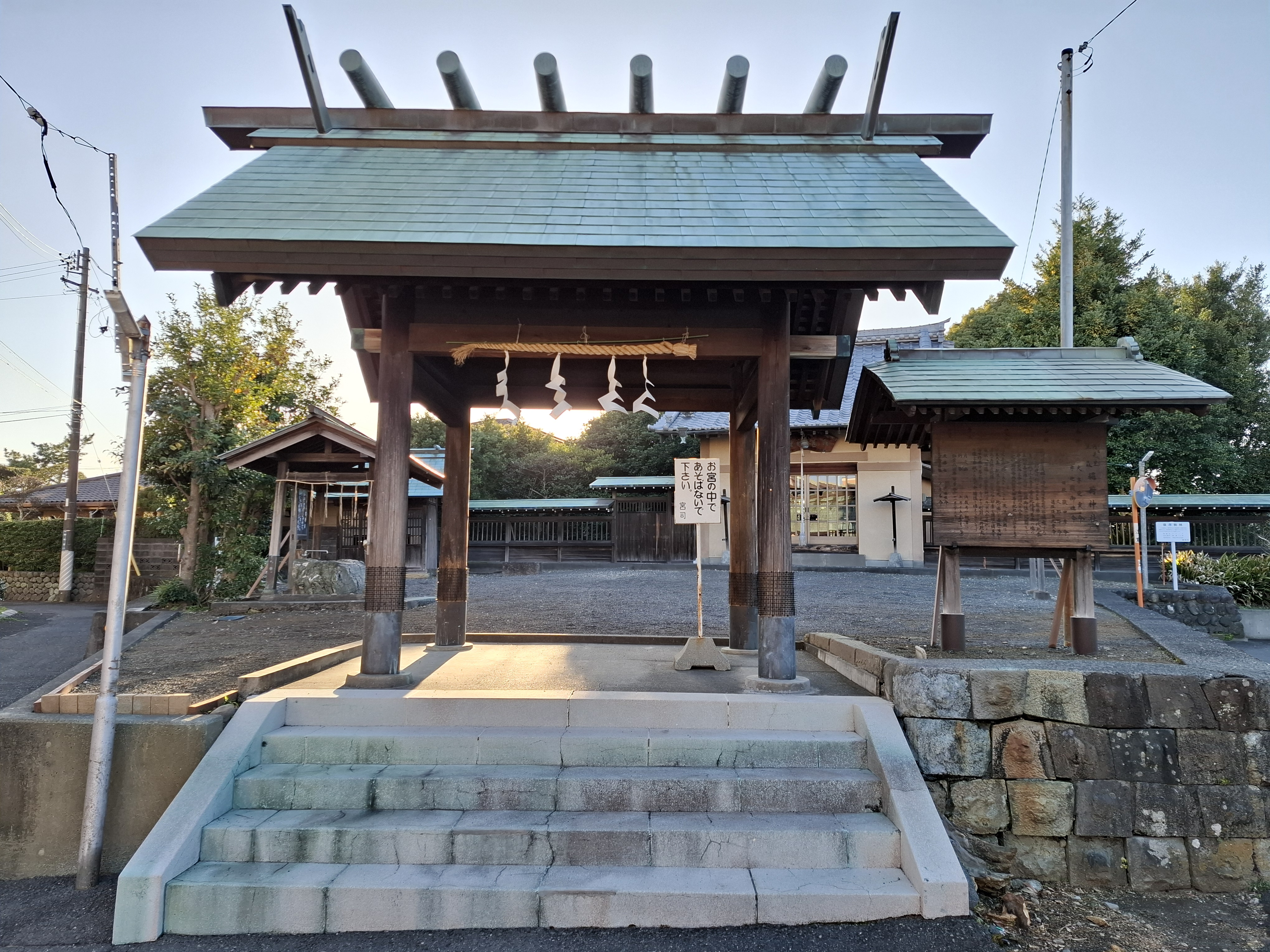
Yamanashi Kasamori Inari Shrine (月見里笠森稲荷神社, Yamanashi Kasamori Inari Jinja), where Nagasawa Katsutate was its head priest throughout much of his life

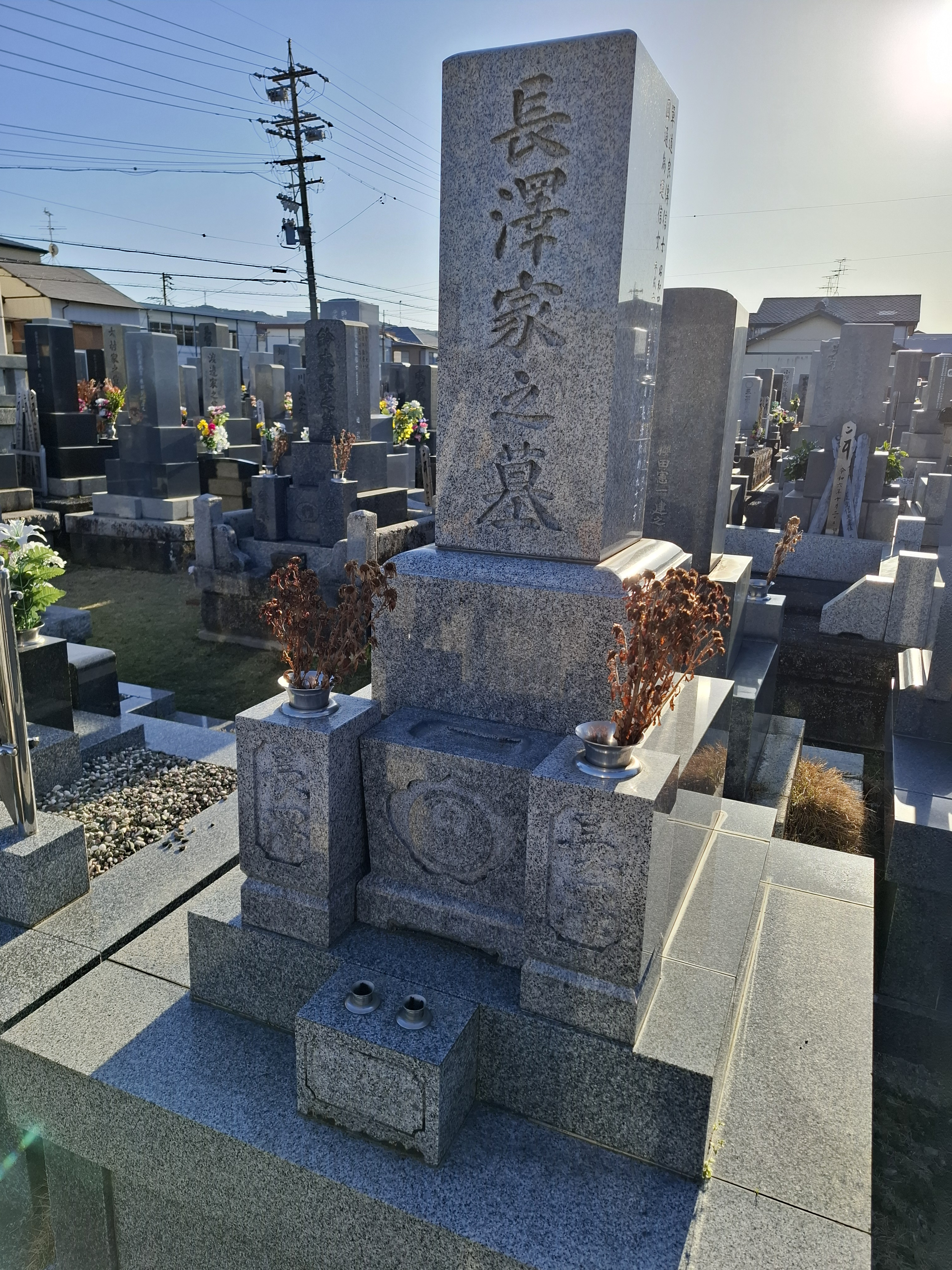
Nagasawa Katsutate's grave at Baiin Zen Temple in Shimizu, Shizuoka

Nagasawa Katsutate (長澤雄楯) (September 14, 1858 – October 10, 1940) was a Japanese Shinto priest and spiritual teacher. He was the spiritual teacher of Deguchi Onisaburo, Tomokiyo Yoshisane, and Nakano Yonosuke, all of whom were founders of notable Japanese new religions.

== Biography ==
=== Early life ===
Nagasawa Katsutate was born on September 14, 1858 (old lunar calendar date: August 8 of the year Ansei 5) in Fujimi Village 不二見村, Abe 安倍 district (now part of the city of Shimizu, Shizuoka). His father was Nagasawa Shinzaemon (新左工門), and his mother was Nagasawa Toyoko (新左豊子).

=== As Shinto priest ===
During Nagasawa's teenage years, he attended the middle teaching institute (中教院, chūkyōin), located at Sengen Shrine (浅間神社, Sengen Jinja) in Shizuoka city.

In 1874, Nagasawa became a teaching assistant at the same school and also served as a ritual assistant at Miho Shrine (御穗神社 / 三保神社, Miho Jinja). During that time, he also became the head priest of Yamanashi Kasamori Inari Shrine (月見里笠森稲荷神社, Yamanashi Kasamori Inari Jinja) (note that 月見里 has the reading "Yamanashi"). He established the Inari Confraternity (稲荷講社, Inari Kōsha) at Yamanashi Shrine in 1891. Nagasawa was later promoted as head priest of Miho Shrine, which would attain the rank of a prefectural shrine (県社, kensha) in 1898.

=== Disciples ===
In 1885, Nagasawa met Honda Chikaatsu and became one of Honda's most capable disciples. From Honda, he learned a type of meditation (and/or spirit possession) practice known as chinkon kishin (鎮魂帰神) (lit. 'calming the soul and returning to the divine'), which is practiced in the Japanese new religions Ananaikyo, Shintō Tenkōkyo, and Oomoto today.

On April 28, 1898, Deguchi Onisaburo, the founder of the Oomoto religion, traveled from his hometown in Anao, Kameoka to Shimizu to become Nagasawa's disciple, forming the start of a lifelong friendship. Just two weeks earlier on April 15, Deguchi had also been appointed Middle Supervisor (chūkantoku) of Nagasawa's Inari Confraternity (稲荷講社, Inari Kōsha) at Yamanashi Shrine by Mitsuya Kiemon (三矢喜右衛門), a member of the confraternity who went to Anao to invite Deguchi to join. According to Oomoto's historical narratives, Nagasawa's mother Toyoko (豊子) gave three books from Honda Chikaatsu to Deguchi, which were Shinden hisho (神伝秘書; also known as Reigakushō 霊学抄), Michi no taigen (道之大原), and Shintō montai (真道問対). Upon reading the books, Deguchi said that they contained the same teachings that the kami Kotodamahiko (異霊彦) had taught him while he had performed his ascetic training on Mount Takakuma in March 1898. As a result, Deguchi identified Kotodamahiko as the spirit of Honda Chikaatsu. He practiced chinkon kishin with Nagasawa, with Deguchi serving as kannushi (possessed person) while Nagasawa served as saniwa (spirit mediator). Deguchi also received a chinkon jewel (鎮魂の玉, chinkon no tama) and stone flute from Nagasawa Toyoko.

Around 1920, Tomokiyo Yoshisane (友清歓真), who had been an Oomoto member from 1918 to 1919, studied chinkon kishin with Nagasawa and went on to found the Shintō Tenkōkyo religion in 1922. In 1930, Nagasawa was granted an audience with Emperor Hirohito.

From 1938 until his death in 1940, Nagasawa taught Nakano Yonosuke (中野與之助) 1887–1974), originally an Oomoto follower prior to the Second Oomoto Incident of 1935, who would make daily commutes from his home in Yaizu to Nagasawa's house. There, Nakano learned much of Honda Chikaatsu's teachings and practices from Nagasawa. On September 14, 1940, Nakano was initiated as the successor to the official lineage of Spirit Studies (霊学, Reigaku) (or "Honda spiritualist studies" (本田霊学, Honda reigaku)) in a ceremony that lasted an entire week and was attended by four lawyers and two witnesses.

=== Death and legacy ===
Nagasawa died on October 10, 1940 and was buried at Baiin Zen Temple (梅蔭禅寺, Baiin Zen-ji). Upon Nagasawa's death, Nakano Yonosuke became Nagasawa's successor. Nakano went on to found the Ananaikyo religion on April 4, 1949, which he saw as fulfilling Nagasawa's 1899 prophecy that a world religion would be founded after 50 years.

== Writings ==
Only three writings can be attributed directly to Nagasawa.

1. "100 poems during spirit possession" (神憑百首, Kamigakari hyakushu) consists of 100 tanka poems written down from 1926 to 1929 by Nagasawa and his student Take Eidayū (武栄太夫). The poems, considered to be of divine origin, were revealed while Take was under spirit possession as a kannushi, with Nagasawa serving as the spirit mediator (saniwa). The poems were published by Take in 1934. 62 reordered poems are included in Suzuki (1977).
2. "Deities" (惟神, Kannagara) consists of published selections of an opinion that Nagasawa and provided on March 10, 1927 for the second trial that was held after the First Oomoto Incident (1921).
3. "Opinion on the Ōmoto incident" (大本教事件二対スル意見, Ōmotokyō jiken ni taisuru iken) is a shorthand record of an interview between 3 Oomoto lawyers and Nagasawa from September 15–16, 1940 (the interview on September 17, 1940 was not recorded). It consists of 130 pages.
