= Astronomy and religion =

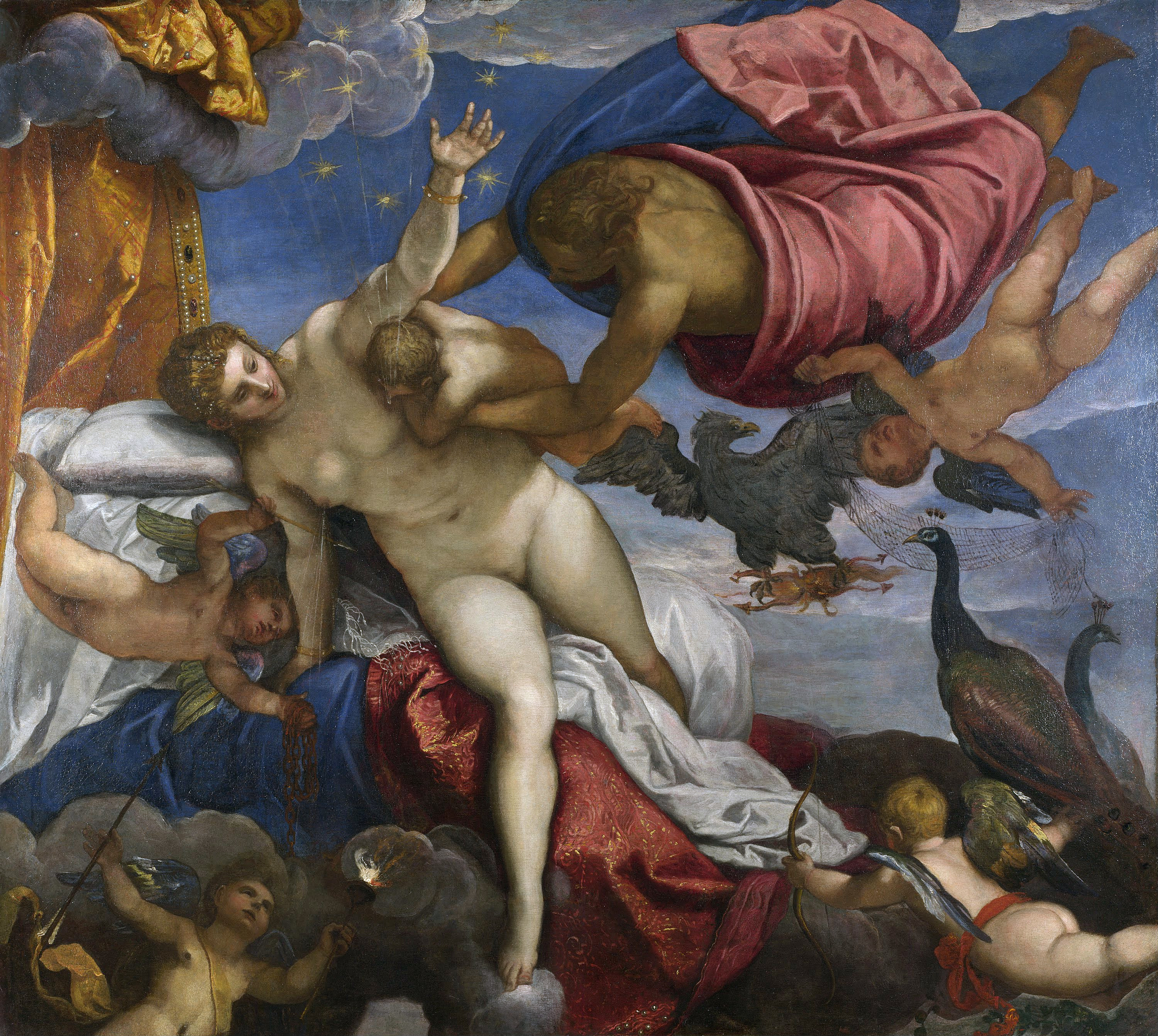
The Origin of the Milky Way (c. 1575–1580) by Tintoretto

Astronomy has been a favorite and significant component of mythology and religion throughout history. Astronomy and cosmology are parts of the myths of many cultures and religion around the world. Astronomy and religion have long been closely intertwined, particularly during the early history of astronomy. Archaeological evidence of many ancient cultures demonstrates that celestial bodies were the subject of worship during the Stone and Bronze Ages. Amulets and stone walls in northern Europe depict arrangements of stars in constellations that match their historical positions, particularly circumpolar constellations. These date back as much as 30,000–40,000 years.

In many ancient religions, the northern circumpolar stars were associated with darkness, death and the underworld of the dead. For the Aztecs, the northern stars were associated with Tezcatlipoca. In Peking, China, was a shrine devoted to the North Star deity. Such worship of the northern stars may have been associated with time keeping, as the positions of the stars could identify the annual seasons. Likewise, as agriculture developed, the need to keep accurate time led to more careful tracking of the positions of the sun, moon and planets; resulting with their deification when they became inextricably linked with the means of survival. In the ancient Egyptian calendar, the date of the annual flooding of the Nile was predicted by observing the heliacal rising of a star. Indeed, the belief in a strong association between the events on the earth and in the heavens led to the development of astrology.

The first recorded conflict between religious orthodoxy and astronomy occurred with the Greek astronomer Anaxagoras. His beliefs that the heavenly bodies were the result of an evolutionary process and that the sun was a great burning stone (rather than the deity Helios), resulted in his arrest. He was charged with contravening the established religious beliefs. Although acquitted, he was forced to go into retirement.

As science expanded during the Renaissance, the secular beliefs of scientific investigators encountered the opposition of Christian orthodoxy. The most famous such conflict was that of Galileo Galilei, who was tried by the Inquisition on suspicion of heresy. However, many astronomers were also highly religious and attempted to reconcile their beliefs with the discoveries they made following the invention of the telescope.

== Background ==
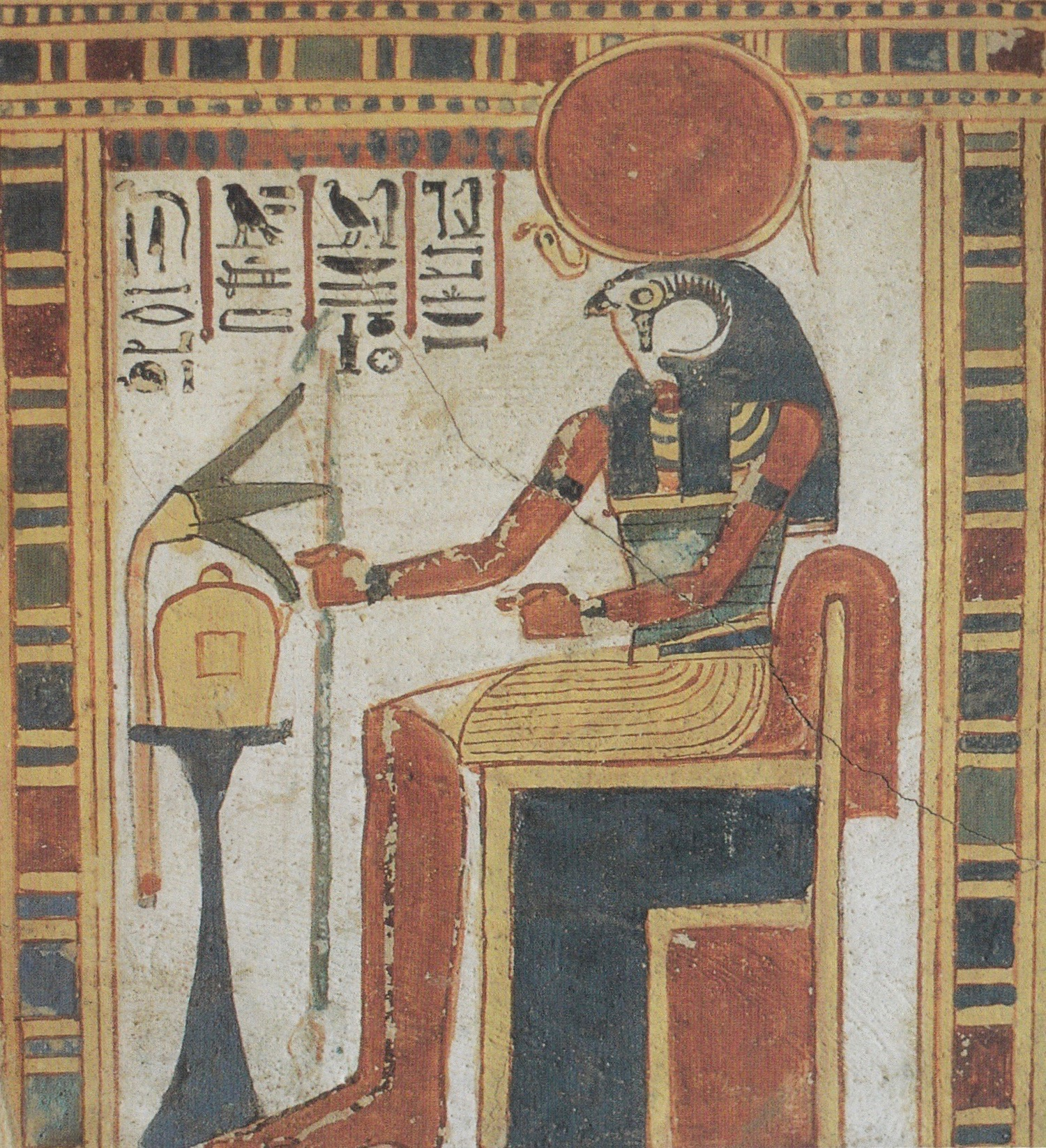
Ra, often known as the Sun God, is the Ancient Egyptian deity seen in this image

Astronomy and spirituality have long been intertwined and closely related in looking to the heavens. With human spaceflight, psychological and cognitive changes were reported by people who directly interacted with outer space, either in visual manner or in exposure, demonstrated a quality of being furiously motivated and concerned about the Earth.

Though astronomy and spirituality may appear to be two separate topics, they both look for answers in the same area: the cosmos. Both astrology and spirituality have been utilized for many millenniums. Numerous ancient civilizations worshiped the Sun, Moon, and stars. For example, Heliopolis, or the City of the Sun, was Egypt's most renowned spiritual temple and civilization, the foundation of Ancient Egyptian mythology. Its hillside site, near present-day Cairo, was thought to be where the Sun god Ra and the creator god Aten first appeared.

== Heliocentrism and geocentrism ==
Heliocentrism is the idea that the sun is the center of the universe, and all the planets revolve around it. This is opposite to geocentrism in which the Earth is the center of the universe with the sun and all the other planets revolve around it. The geocentric model was the widely accepted model during the times of Plato, Aristotle, Ptolemy, and other astronomers. This model was rooted in observations made by astronomers at the time as well as being rooted in religion. Nicolaus Copernicus followed by astronomers such as Galileo Galilei and Johannes Kepler suggested a different model with the sun at the center of the universe. This model was based on more extensive and precise observations with classical instruments, The newly created telescope provided supporting evidence and mathematical studies suggested orbits in the shape of ellipses. These models were not accepted by society which at the time was dominated by the Catholic religion and these astronomers received harsh criticism both the church and those around them.

The argument by Tammaso Cassini was that the bible did not support the Earth revolving around the Sun. One example provided was in Joshua 10 when God stopped the Sun for Joshua. It was also argued that God would place his greatest creation at the center of the universe thus moving the Earth out of the center took away from the greatness of his creation

== Galileo and religion ==
The Sidereus Nuncius written by Galileo in 1610, approved by the Holy Office, attracted much attention. This writing documented his observations using the telescope, describing the Moons of Jupiter and the mountains of the Moon.

By 1616 the Holy Office also known as the Inquisition condemned the Copernican theory henceforth condemning the works of Galileo. If the science did not back up scripture, then it was not to be taught.

By 1633, Galileo's new best-seller Dialogue Concerning the Two Chief World Systems had been prohibited. He recanted his heliocentrism and was sentenced to home arrest for the rest of his life. Four hundred years after Galileo's death, Pope John Paul II set up a committee to look into the trial and Galileo was pardoned.

== Newton and religion ==
Isaac Newton was raised as an Anglican. After coming to the conclusion that the Holy Trinity could not exist because Jesus couldn't be equal to God, Newton chose to not become a minister. He still believed in the Bible and that the idea of going against the first commandment was worse than walking away from Cambridge. Newton didn't believe religion and science were mutually exclusive and used the Bible as a guide for his work. Despite his desire to connect the science to the scripture, he was attacked by society and the church in his writing of the Principia when he was studying astronomy and soon delved into other works after being incapable of handling the criticism from his peers. Newton turned to alchemy using Greek myths to guide his work and became known less for his work in astronomy creating the reflecting telescope and more for his work in developing a scientific procedure and his laws around gravity.

== In Japan (20th century) ==
Ananaikyo, a Shinto-derived religion founded in 1949, is known for building several astronomical observatories in Japan, since Ananaikyo states that "astronomy is religion" (天文即宗教).

== See also ==
- Astronomy and Christianity
- Astronomy in the medieval Islamic world
- Hebrew astronomy
- History of astrology
- History of astronomy
- Pantheism
- Relationship between religion and science
- Worship of heavenly bodies
