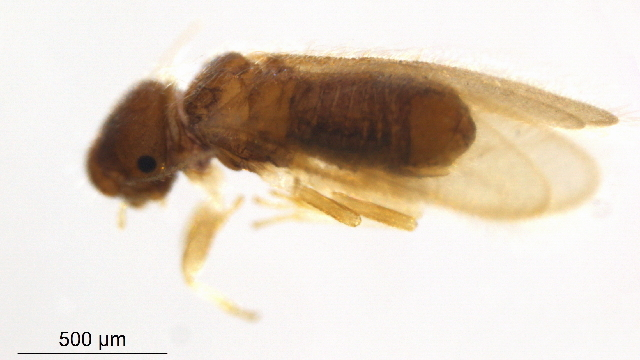
- Archipsocus nomas

Scientific classification
- Domain: Eukaryota
- Kingdom: Animalia
- Phylum: Arthropoda
- Class: Insecta
- Order: Psocodea
- Family: Archipsocidae
- Subfamily: Archipsocinae
- Genus: Archipsocus; Hagen, 1882

Species
- See text

= Archipsocus =

Genus of booklice

Archipsocus is a genus of bark lice in the insect family Archipsocidae. Members of this genus are found in tropical and subtropical regions of the world and were first reported in North America in 1934 when Archipsocus nomas became abundant near New Orleans.

Psocids in the genus Archipsocus differ from each other on minute particulars and there is not a single feature that can be used to diagnose all the species. Some characteristics that may be useful include the length of the different segments of the antennae and the shape of the phallic frame.

== Taxonomy ==
Some species that used to be included in this genus and which give birth by parthenogenesis to live young, have now been separated into the genus Archipsocopsis. These include Archipsocopsis frater (Mockford, 1957) and Archipsocopsis parvula (Mockford, 1953).

== Some selected species ==
- Archipsocus badonneli
- Archipsocus brasilianus (Enderlein)
- Archipsocus broadheadi (Badonnel)
- Archipsocus castrii (Badonnel)
- Archipsocus cervinus
- Archipsocus corbetae (Smithers, 1964)
- Archipsocus costalima
- Archipsocus dextor (Enderlein, 1911)
- Archipsocus enderleini
- Archipsocus floridanus (Mockford, 1953)
- Archipsocus gibberophallus
- Archipsocus granulosus (Badonnel)
- Archipsocus gurneyi (Mockford, 1953)
- Archipsocus indentatus (Mockford)
- Archipsocus lenkoi (Badonnel)
- Archipsocus lineatus
- Archipsocus minutillus
- Archipsocus mockfordi
- Archipsocus modestus
- Archipsocus newi (Badonnel)
- Archipsocus nomas (Gurney, 1939)
- Archipsocus panama (Gurney, 1939)
- Archipsocus pearmani
- Archipsocus tenebricosus
