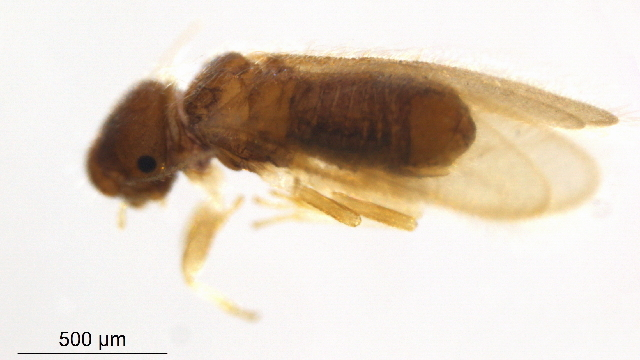
- Archipsocus nomas

Scientific classification
- Kingdom: Animalia
- Phylum: Arthropoda
- Class: Insecta
- Order: Psocodea
- Family: Archipsocidae
- Genus: Archipsocus
- Species: A. nomas

Binomial name
- Archipsocus nomas Gurney, 1939

= Archipsocus nomas =

Species of booklouse

Archipsocus nomas is a web-spinning barklouse, a psocid in the insect family Archipsocidae. It is found in the southeast of the United States, living gregariously on trees, feeding on lichen and fungi and spinning a web that adheres to the trunk and large branches in sheets. The webs are thought to protect the barklice from predators and neither the insects nor the webs cause damage to the trees.

== Distribution ==
This barklouse is found near the Atlantic coast of the United States southwards from South Carolina and along the Gulf Coast from Florida to Texas.

== Description ==
Both adults and nymphs of A. nomas are soft-bodied insects resembling aphids, with long narrow antennae. The mandibles are designed for chewing and the central part of the maxilla is modified into a slender rod which is used to brace the psocid while it grinds away with its mandibles. The forehead is enlarged and there are prominent compound eyes and three ocelli. There are glands in the mouth from which silk can be spun. The eggs are pale gray or white, oblong and wider at one end than the other. The first instar nymphs are recognisable by the fact that their heads are wider than their bodies. They are wingless, miniature versions of the adult and have a pale brown head and creamy white thorax. It is unclear how many moults the nymphs undergo but in the closely related species, Archipsocus floridanus, the females moult six times whereas the males usually moult five times. Later instars are darker in colour and the third instar female exhibits wing pads for the first time. There are five times as many adult females as there are adult males but parthenogenesis has not been observed in this species. The adults are darker in color than the nymphs and are about three millimetres long. Not all adults have wings, but when they do, these are transparent and held in a tent-like position above the body. Some females have longer wings than others but when the males have wings, these are always short.

== Life cycle ==
In the spring, female barklice lay eggs singly or in groups in crevices on the trunks of trees and cover them with debris for protection. Hardwood trees are chosen for egg laying, particularly evergreen oaks and pecans. As the weather grows warmer, the number of insects mounts and from July to October the colonies rapidly increase in size. The sheets of silken webbing they build may cover the trunk and main branches of the tree. It is at this time of year that long-winged females are seen and these fly off to establish new colonies on other trees. By early December, populations are beginning to decline and most psocids are killed by frosts during the winter. The webs tatter and disintegrate in bad weather. Both nymphs and adults feed primarily on small crustose lichens, but also consume fungi, dead bark and organic debris. The insects overwinter as adults and occasionally as late instar nymphs on the evergreen southern live oak, Quercus virginiana, and cabbage palms, Sabal palmetto, where they are less likely to be killed by frost than on other trees. Polymorphism sometimes occurs in this species.

== The web ==
The webs are a dense sheet of strands, each of which is finer than the silk spun by spiders. They may cover tree trunks and branches, and also sometimes occur on the sides of buildings and the leaves of palm trees, oaks and magnolias. On tree trunks, the long axis of the web is usually parallel to the trunk and the fabric contours the grooves and ridges. On branches the web may appear to originate from twig junctions. The psocids can detect vibrations in the web and take action to escape from potential predators which are usually spiders and ants. Several species of mites and springtails have been found under the web but they seem to be casual visitors, having no relationship with the psocids but also gaining protection from the web.

== Behaviour ==
Although these psocids are gregarious, they are not social in the sense usually used by entomologists. The female does not care for the eggs after they have been laid but the nymphs do grow up in the protective environment of their parental web, to which they also contribute silk for building and repairs.
