= Honda Chikaatsu =

Japanese Shinto writer (1822–1889)

- 本田親徳
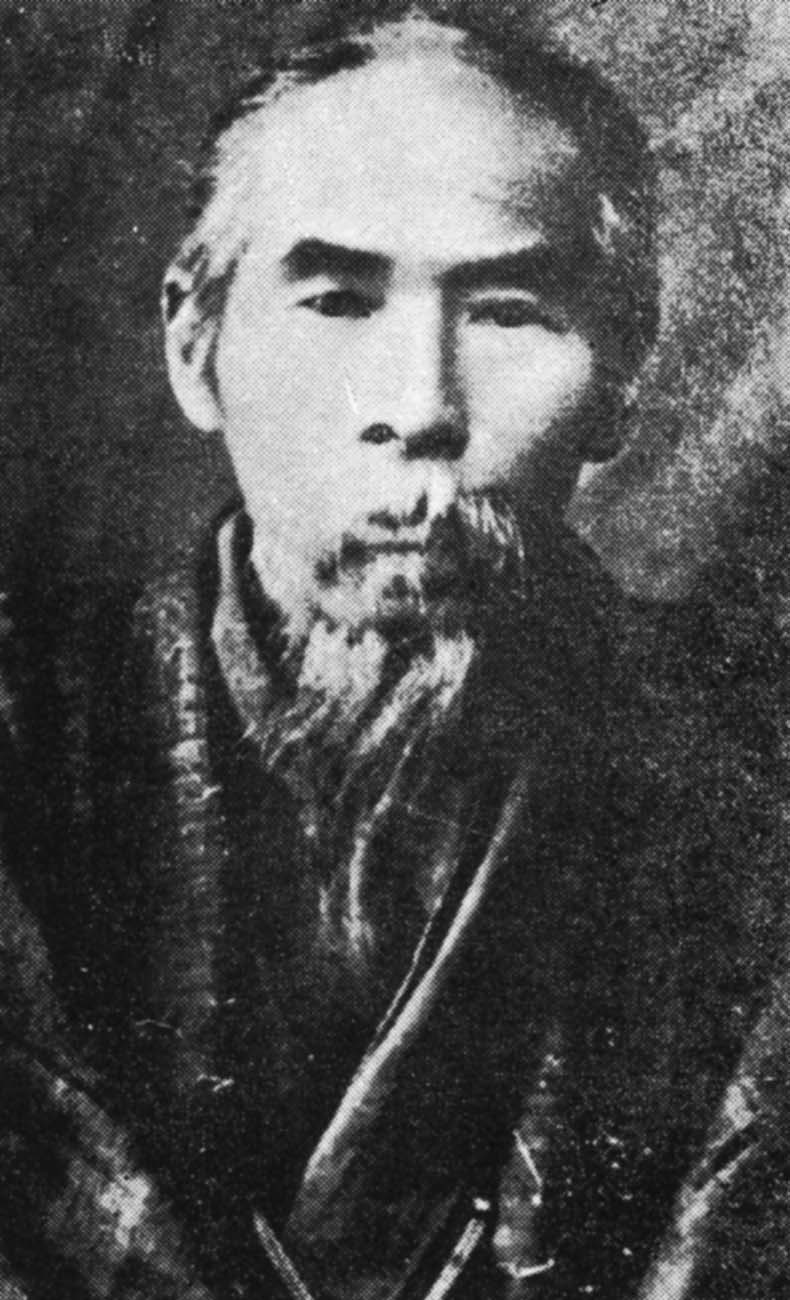

Personal life
- Born: Honda Kurō (本田九朗); February 4, 1822 Kaseda, Minamisatsuma, Kagoshima
- Died: April 9, 1889 (aged 67) Kawagoe, Saitama
- Spouse: Chikako (知可子)
- Children: Setsu (節), Mika (ミカ)
- Parent: Honda Shuzō (本田主蔵) (father)
- Notable work(s): Michi no taigen (道之大原), Reigakushō (霊学抄), and others
- Known for: Chinkon kishin
- Occupation: Religious teacher

Religious life
- Religion: Shinto

Senior posting
- Students: Nagasawa Katsutate; Soejima Taneomi

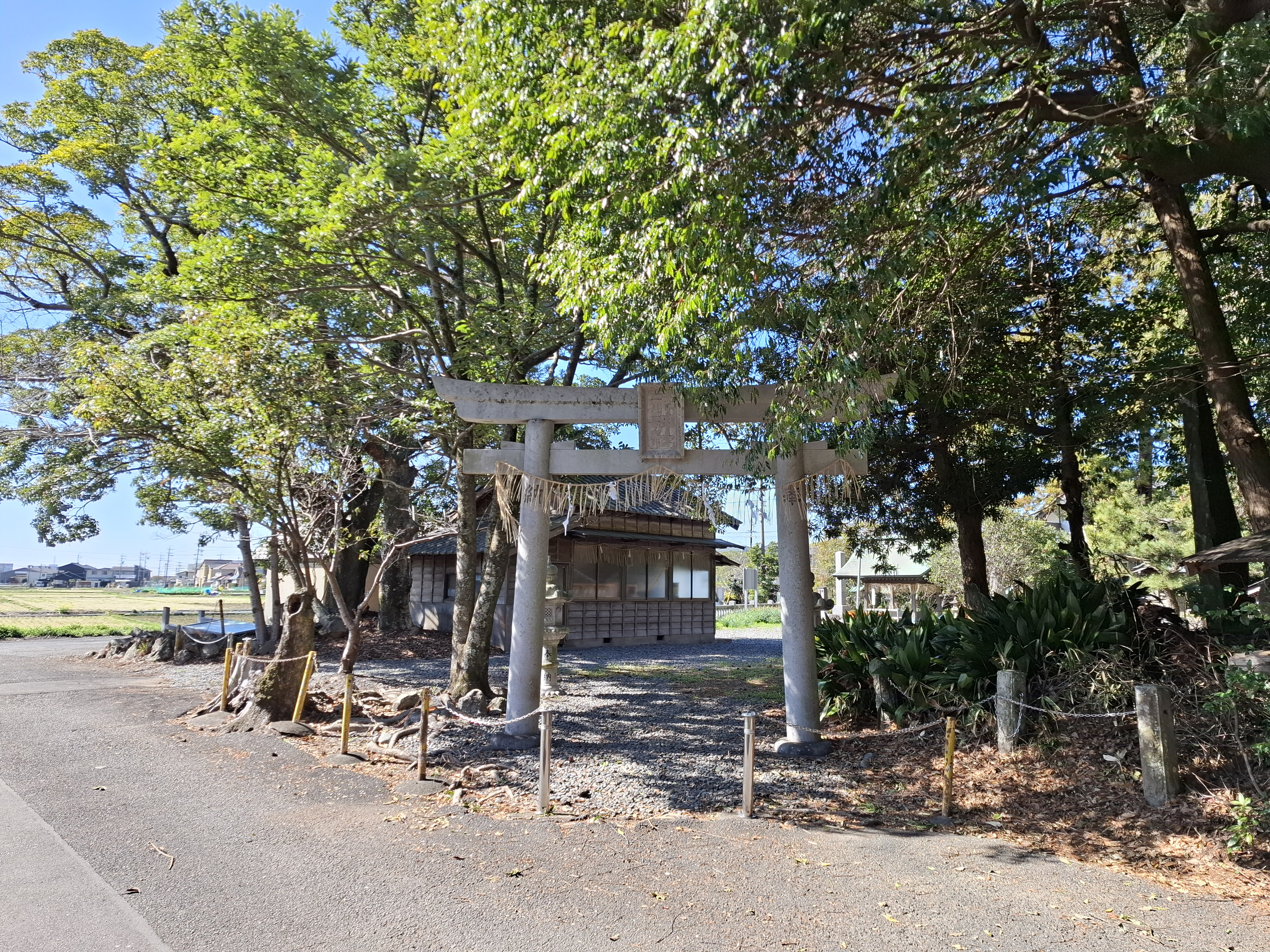
Miwa Shrine (神神社, Miwa Jinja), where Honda Chikaatsu often stayed at during the last several years of his life

Honda Chikaatsu (本田親徳) (February 4, 1822 – April 9, 1889) was a Japanese Shinto writer, philosopher, religious teacher, and spiritualist. Honda is known for devising the meditation and spirit possession techniques chinkon (鎮魂) and kishin (帰神), respectively. He produced several writings in Japanese and literary Chinese (kanbun) at the start of the Meiji era during the 1870s and 1880s.

Since the 1970s, there has been a resurgence of interest in Honda's writings as they were published and became widely available. The study of Honda's teachings is typically referred to in Japan as Honda reigaku (本田霊学, "Honda spiritualist studies"). Many books on Honda reigaku are published by the Tokyo-based publishing company Hachiman Shoten (八幡書店).

Today, the Japanese new religions Shinto Tenkokyo, Ananaikyo, and Oomoto are direct descendants of Honda's spiritual lineage, since the founders of these religions had all been dedicated disciples of Honda's student Nagasawa Katsutate. Honda's teachings and practices have also significantly influenced other Oomoto-derived religions.

== Life ==
He was born Honda Kurō (本田九朗) on February 4, 1822 (old calendar date: January 13 of the year Bunsei 5) in present-day Kaseda (加世田), Minamisatsuma, Kagoshima Prefecture. One of his other names was Zui'en (瑞園). He was the eldest son of Honda Shuzō (本田主蔵), who was either a physician or of samurai descent. As a child, he studied classic literature and martial arts.

From 1839 to 1841, Honda studied literature and philosophy with Aizawa Seishisai of the Mito School. At the time, he also often visited Hirata Atsutane. Other than Aizawa and Hirata, Tachibana Moribe (1781–1849) also influenced Honda. Afterwards, Honda traveled widely through Japan, often venturing into the mountains to seek spiritual wisdom, and became a religious teacher. One of his best students was Nagasawa Katsutate (長澤雄楯, 1858–1940), who reputedly learned virtually all of Honda's teachings and practices. Nagasawa then passed them onto Onisaburo Deguchi (出口王仁三郎, the founder of Oomoto) beginning in 1898, Yoshisane Tomokiyo (友清歓真, the founder of Shintō Tenkōkyo) around 1920, and finally Yonosuke Nakano (中野與之助, the founder of Ananaikyo) during the last few years of his life.

Honda's second wife was Chikako (知可子, born 1852 or 1853). His son, Setsu (節), was born in 1863 (September 13 of the year Bunkyū 3), and his eldest daughter Mika (ミカ) was born on March 15, 1879. Mika, also known as Kaoruko (薰子), often served as Honda's spirit medium (kannushi 神主) during kishin sessions, while his wife Chikako acted as the spirit mediator (審神者, saniwa).

Honda performed rituals at various Shinto shrines but may never have been appointed with a long-term position as a shrine's official priest. He is not mentioned in Meiji-era official records, partly because his views were considered to be heretical by mainstream Shintoists. In 1872, Honda may have been appointed head priest of Nunakuma Shrine (沼名前神社, Nunakuma Jinja) in Hiroshima Prefecture, but left shortly after due to an argument with his superiors. His father also died in 1872, upon which he became the head of the family.

During the 1870s and 1880s, Honda produced many writings. In the early 1870s, Saigō Takamori introduced Honda to Soejima Taneomi, an influential politician and diplomat. Honda most likely first met Soejima in 1873 in Tokyo. Soejima became one of Honda's most erudite disciples.

Honda often stayed at Miwa Shrine (神神社, Miwa Jinja) in present-day Okabe-cho (岡部町), Fujieda, Shizuoka from around 1884 to 1888, where he was hosted by Miwa Takeshi (三輪武, 1849–1912). During his time at Miwa Shrine, Nagasawa Katsutate became his disciple. Afterwards, Honda moved to his wife's hometown in Chichibu District, Saitama. He died in 1889 in Kawagoe, Saitama. His spirit is believed to reside in a stone flute held at Miwa Shrine.

== Teachings ==
Honda's philosophy is heavily influenced by Taoist philosophy, and to some extent Confucian philosophy as well.

=== Cosmology and deities ===
In Honda's worldview, deities (神, kami), ceremonies (斎, sai), etc. can be classified into visible/perceptible (顕, ken) (sometimes also written as 現) versus invisible/imperceptible (幽, yū) types. The one supreme god who created heaven and earth is Ame no Minakanushi (天御中主), the "true god" (真神, shinjin) who is also referred to as the "great spirit" (大精神, daiseishin), "heavenly lord" (天主, tenshu), or "highest king" (上帝, jōtei). Ame no Minakanushi is the invisible deity of the imperceptible heaven, while the sun goddess Amaterasu is in the perceptible heaven.

According to Honda's Reigakushō (霊学抄), the universe can be divided into the World of True Deities (正神界, seishinkai) and the World of the Obscure and Bewitching (妙魅界, myōmikai), also known as the World of False Deities (邪神界, jashinkai). Each of the two world consists of 181 levels, giving a total of 362 levels.

=== Spirit possession methods ===
There are 36 methods of spirit possession (kamigakari 神懸/神憑). Kishin (spirit possession) methods consist of 4 sets, each containing these 9 types (with deities classified into upper, middle, and lower grades):

- inspired from within (自感法, jikanhō) (inspiration from self-cultivation): upper, middle, lower.
- inspired from without (他感法, takanhō) (inspiration from mediated spirit possession): upper, middle, lower
- divinely inspired (神感法, shinkanhō) (direct inspiration from a deity without any human intervention): upper, middle, lower

The 4 sets, each of which has the 9 types listed above, are:

1. Formless (無形, mukei) in the World of True Deities (正神界, seishinkai)
2. Having form (有形, yūkei) in the World of True Deities (正神界, seishinkai)
3. Formless (無形, mukei) in the World of False Deities (邪神界, jashinkai)
4. Having form (有形, yūkei) in the World of False Deities (邪神界, jashinkai)

This gives a total of 36 spirit possession methods. Honda's classification system of 36 spirit possession methods is also described in some of Tomokiyo Yoshisane's works, such as A Guide to Spirit Studies (霊学筌蹄, Reigaku sentei) and The essence of chinkon kishin (鎮魂帰神の極意, Chinkon kishin no gokui).

=== Theorems of the Great Three ===
In Reigakushō (霊学抄), the Theorems of the Great Three (三大学則, sandai gakusoku) are divine body (体, karada), energy (力, chikara), and spirit (霊, rei). These can be further analyzed to consist of the following.

1. Spirit

Human souls were created by Ame no Minakanushi from one spiritual guide (直霊, naobi), which is the eternal spiritual fraction of the supreme creator deity (cf. anima mundi), and four essences (四魂, yonkon). Together, they are known as "one spirit, four essences" (一霊四魂, ichirei yonkon). The four essences, which are also mentioned in the Nihon Shoki, are:

1. rough essence (荒霊, ara-mitama) (associated with courage 勇)
2. harmonious essence (和霊, nigi-mitama) (associated with intimacy 親)
3. wondrous essence (奇霊, kushi-mitama) (associated with wisdom 智)
4. prosperous essence (幸霊, saki-mitama) (associated with love 愛)

2. Body

As mentioned in Shintō montai (真道問対), the three aggregate states (三体, santai) are:

1. hard (剛, gō)
2. soft (柔, jū)
3. liquid (流, ryū)

3. Energy/power

Energy or power is made out of the eight forces (八力, hachiriki).

1. moving (動, dō)
2. keeping still (静, sei)
3. tightening (引, in)
4. loosening (弛, shi)
5. hardening (凝, gyō)
6. softening (解, kai)
7. dividing (分, bun)
8. uniting (合, gō)

Onisaburo Deguchi's divine elements in Michi no Shiori are derived from those of Honda's.

=== Kotodama and kazudama ===
Kotodama (言霊), the spiritual power of words, was an important part of Honda's beliefs. In Kinmon Hirayama daikyōsei kakka (謹問平山大教正閣下), Honda interprets chinkon as being centered around the kanji character 招 'to invite, summon'. Honda's writings also teach the use of kazudama (数霊), the spiritual power of numerals.

== Writings ==
Honda Chikaatsu zenshū (本田親徳全集) by Suzuki (1976) is a complete anthology of texts written by Chikaatsu Honda, as well as notes by his disciples. Many of these texts are listed below. The editor, Shigemichi Suzuki (鈴木重道), is the grandson of Hiromichi Suzuki (鈴木広道, born 1850), one of Honda's disciples from February 1882 until Honda's death in 1889.

Title (Japanese kanji)	Title (Japanese romaji)	Title (English meaning)	Date	Pages (Suzuki 1976)	Notes
産土百首	Ubusuna hyakushu	100 poems on local deities	6 May 1885	1–10	2 volumes, 50 poems each (100 poems total) on the perceptible and imperceptible aspects of local deities; written in man'yōgana
産土神徳講義	Ubusuna shintoku kōgi	Lectures on the divine virtue of local deities	June 1885	11–21	Importance of revering local deities (notes written by disciple Iwasaki Genkō 岩崎元巧 during two of Honda's lectures)
霊魂百首	Reikon hyakushu	100 poems on spirits	1885 (second half)	23–34	10 poems, each about a separate issue relating to spirits; written in man'yōgana
道之大原	Michi no taigen	Great origin of the way	March 1883	35–42	24 brief chapters or sections summarizing the essence of Honda's teachings, in literary Chinese
真道問対	Shintō montai	Questions and replies on the true way	October 1883	43–80	114 questions from Soejima Taneomi, along with answers from Honda, in literary Chinese
謹問平山大教正閣下	Kinmon Hirayama daikyōsei kakka	Respectfully enquired of your excellence, the senior instructor Hirayama	1874	81–93	Criticism of "The true mystery of the indigenous doctrine" (本教真訣, Honkyō shinketsu) by Hirayama Seisai, which was an explanation of the Taikyo Proclamation
難古事記	Nankojiki	Difficult Kojiki	June 1879 to September 1883	95–243	6 volumes, about 30 sections each, on reinterpreting the Kojiki; 4 other volumes might have been lost
古事記神理解	Kojiki kami rikai	Understanding of the Kojiki's deities	May 1885	245–334	Interpretation of deities in the Kojiki; written by Honda's student Kawaguchi Shinji (川口信之)
霊学抄	Reigakushō	Excerpt from Spirit Studies	undated	369–376	Divination, chinkon and kishin, etc.; also known as the "Secret book of divine messages" (神伝秘書, Shinden hisho)

The full text of Michi no taigen (道之大原), along with commentary, can be found at the end of A Guide to Spirit Studies (霊学筌蹄, Reigaku sentei) by Tomokiyo Yoshisane (友清歓真). The full texts of Michi no taigen (道之大原) and Shintō montai (真道問対) in Literary Chinese (kanbun) can also be found at the end of The essence of chinkon kishin (鎮魂帰神の極意, Chinkon kishin no gokui), which was published by Shintō Tenkōkyo founder Tomokiyo Yoshisane (友清歓真) in 1920. Satō (1978) also has the original text of Michi no taigen along with his own extensive commentary, as well as a modern Japanese translation and his own commentary of Shintō montai. (In 1936, Satō Akihiko (佐藤卿彦, 1913–1986) founded the Kenshin Honkai 顕神本会, a society dedicated to "Honda spiritual studies", and was its executive until his death in 1986.)

A similar text is Questions and answers at Sōkai’s window (滄海窓問答, Sōkaisō mondō) compiled by Sasaki Tetsutarō (佐佐木哲太朗) in 1898. It contains 98 questions and answers on Soejima Taneomi's explanations of Honda's spiritual studies and is also written in Literary Chinese. The questions are asked by Soejima Taneomi, while the answers are from Honda Chikaatsu. The text can be found at the end of Yūmei Hiroku Shinsen Reiten (幽冥秘録神仙霊典), a book published by Tomokiyo Yoshisane in 1920.

The 100-poem collections Ubusuna hyakushu (産土百首) and Reikon hyakushu (霊魂百首) can be found at the end of Kakushinkō densho (格神講伝書), published by Shinto Tenkokyo in 1937.
