= Archipsocus floridanus =

Scientific classification
- Domain: Eukaryota
- Kingdom: Animalia
- Phylum: Arthropoda
- Class: Insecta
- Order: Psocodea
- Family: Archipsocidae
- Genus: Archipsocus
- Species: A. floridanus

Binomial name
- Archipsocus floridanus Mockford, 1953

Species of booklouse

Archipsocus floridanus is a species of ancient barklouse in the family Archipsocidae. It is found in Central America, North America, and South America.
