= Nicolas Amougou Noma =

First Vice-President of the National Assembly of Cameroon
- In office 1990s–2001

President of the Parliamentary Assembly of La Francophonie (APF)
- In office July 1999 – 2001
- Preceded by: Jean-Robert Gauthier

Government Delegate to the Urban Community of Yaoundé
- In office 2001–2004
- Succeeded by: Gilbert Tsimi Evouna

Personal details
- Born: 27 November 1947 Yaoundé, Cameroon
- Died: 11 March 2004 (aged 56) Yaoundé, Cameroon
- Party: Cameroon People's Democratic Movement (RDPC)

Nicolas Amougou Noma is a Cameroonian politician who served in several positions in the 1990s and early 2000s, including as a deputy in the National Assembly, First Vice-President of the National Assembly, President of the Parliamentary Assembly of La Francophonie (APF), and Delegate of the Government to the Urban Community of Yaoundé.

== Early life ==
Nicolas Amougou Noma was born on 27 November 1947 in Yaounde and died at five o'clock, on 11 March 2004 in his Odja residence. il est marie a Régine amougou noma.

== Political career ==
Between 1972 and 1974, he held the position of accounting agent at SOPECAM, also known as the Cameroonian Press and Publishing Company. He then took on the directorship of Editions-Clés, a role he maintained from 1975 through 1990. In 1992, he achieved election as a deputy representing the RDPC party(the Cameroon People’s Democratic Movement (CPDM), standing as a parliamentary candidate in the Mfoundi constituency in the legislative elections of 17 May 1997. In the same year, he reached the upper ranks of political life with his election as First Vice-President of the National Assembly of Cameroon.

In July 1999, while serving as First Vice-President of the National Assembly, he was elected President of the Parliamentary Assembly of the Francophonie (Assemblée parlementaire de la Francophonie, APF) at the organisation’s 25th ordinary session in Ottawa, succeeding the Canadian senator Jean-Robert Gauthier. His election was covered by international press at the time.

From 2001 until his death in 2004, Amougou Noma served as Delegate of the Government to the Urban Community of Yaoundé, a senior administrative post responsible for coordinating national government policy in the capital’s municipal structure. He was succeeded in that role by Gilbert Tsimi Evouna.
