= Ananaikyo =

Japanese new religion

- 三五教
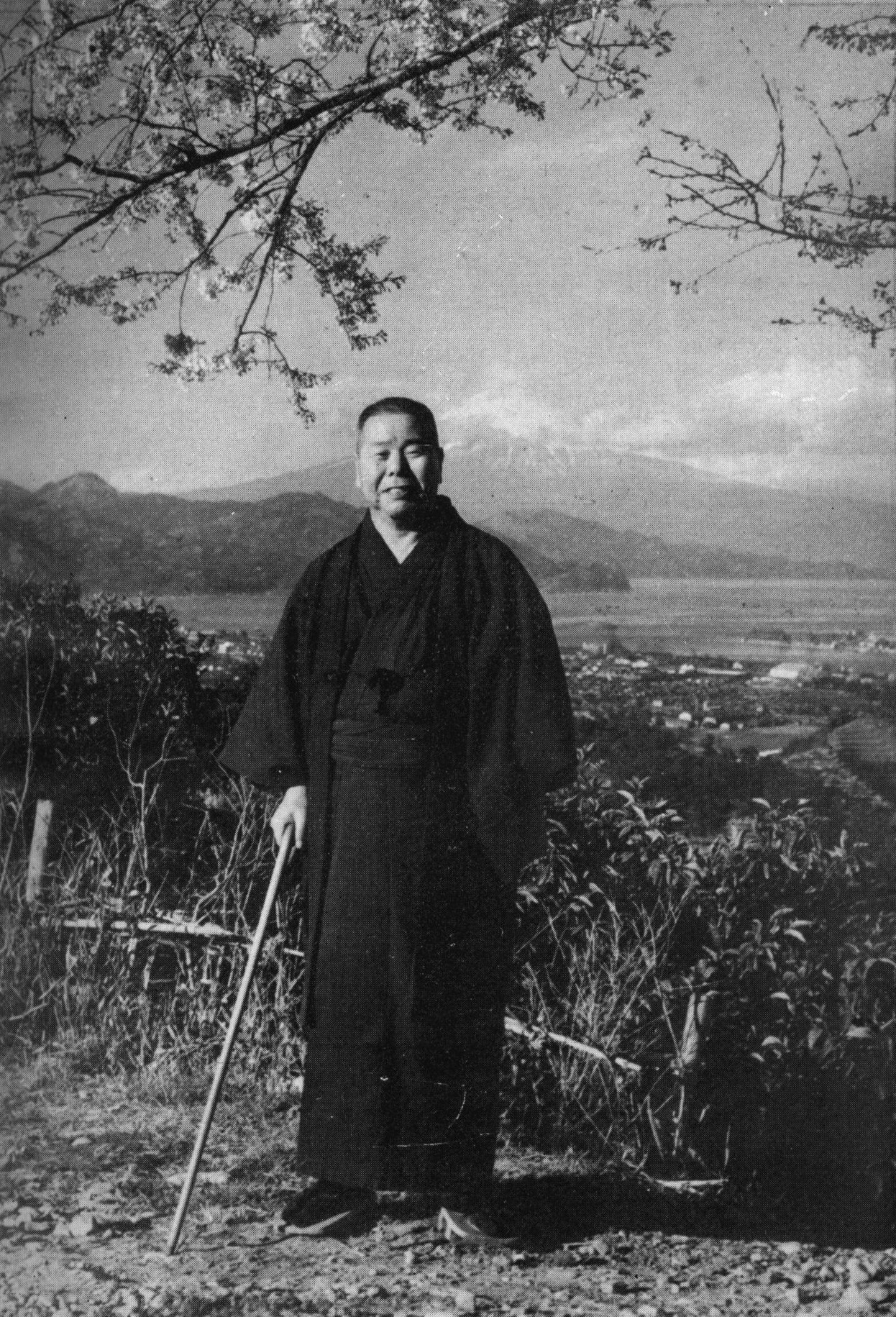
- Yonosuke Nakano (中野與之助), the founder of Ananaikyō, during the early 1950s
- Type: Japanese new religion
- Scripture: Reikai-de Mita Uchū (霊界で観た宇宙) (13 volumes)
- Headquarters: Kakegawa, Shizuoka, Japan
- Founder: Yonosuke Nakano (中野與之助)
- Origin: April 4, 1949; Shimizu, Shizuoka
- Branched from: Oomoto
- Tax status: Religious corporation
- Official website: ananaikyo.jp
- Slogan: Astronomy is religion (天文即宗教, Tenmon Soku Shūkyō)

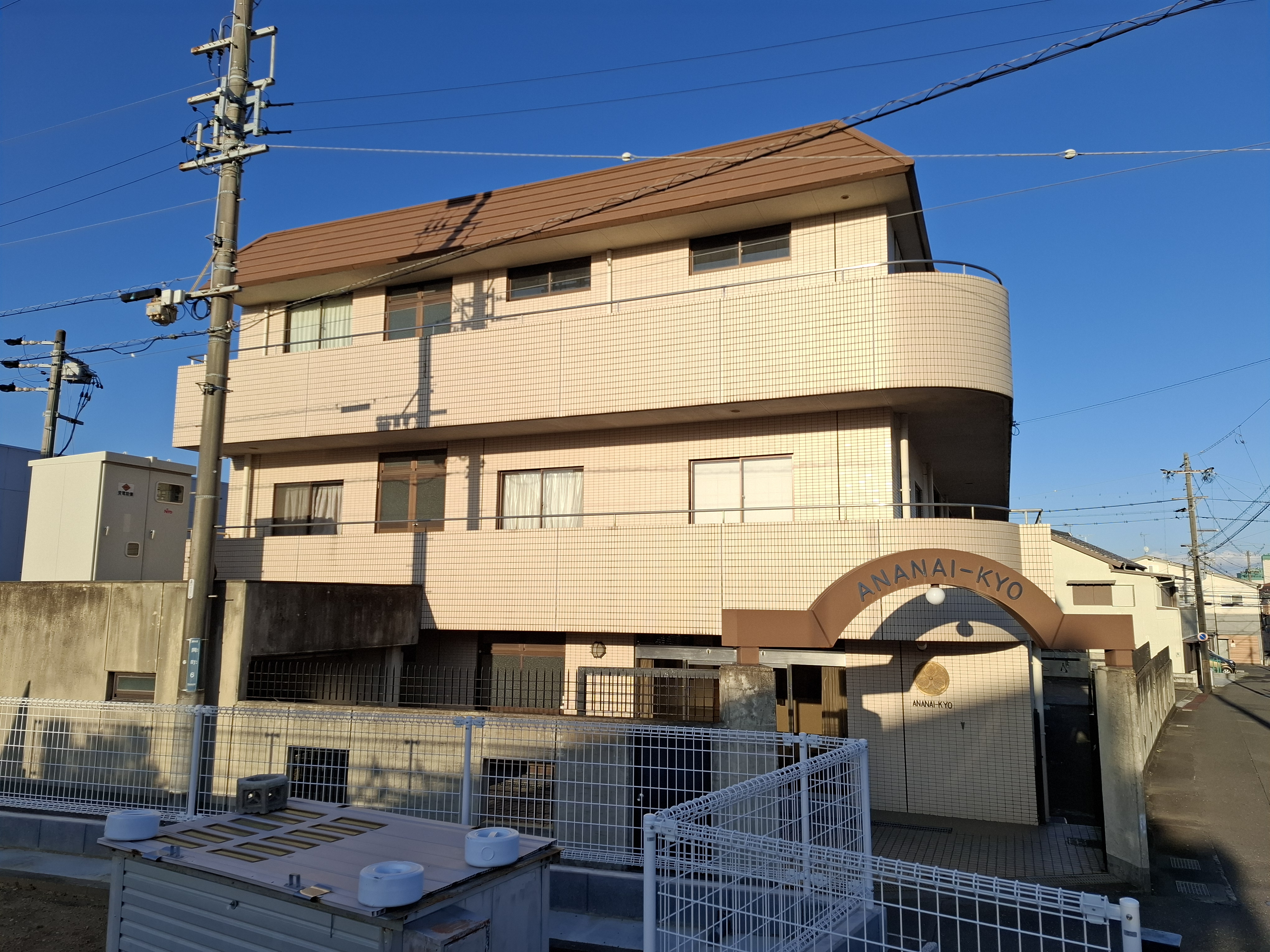
Ananaikyo's former headquarters at Shimizu, Shizuoka Prefecture

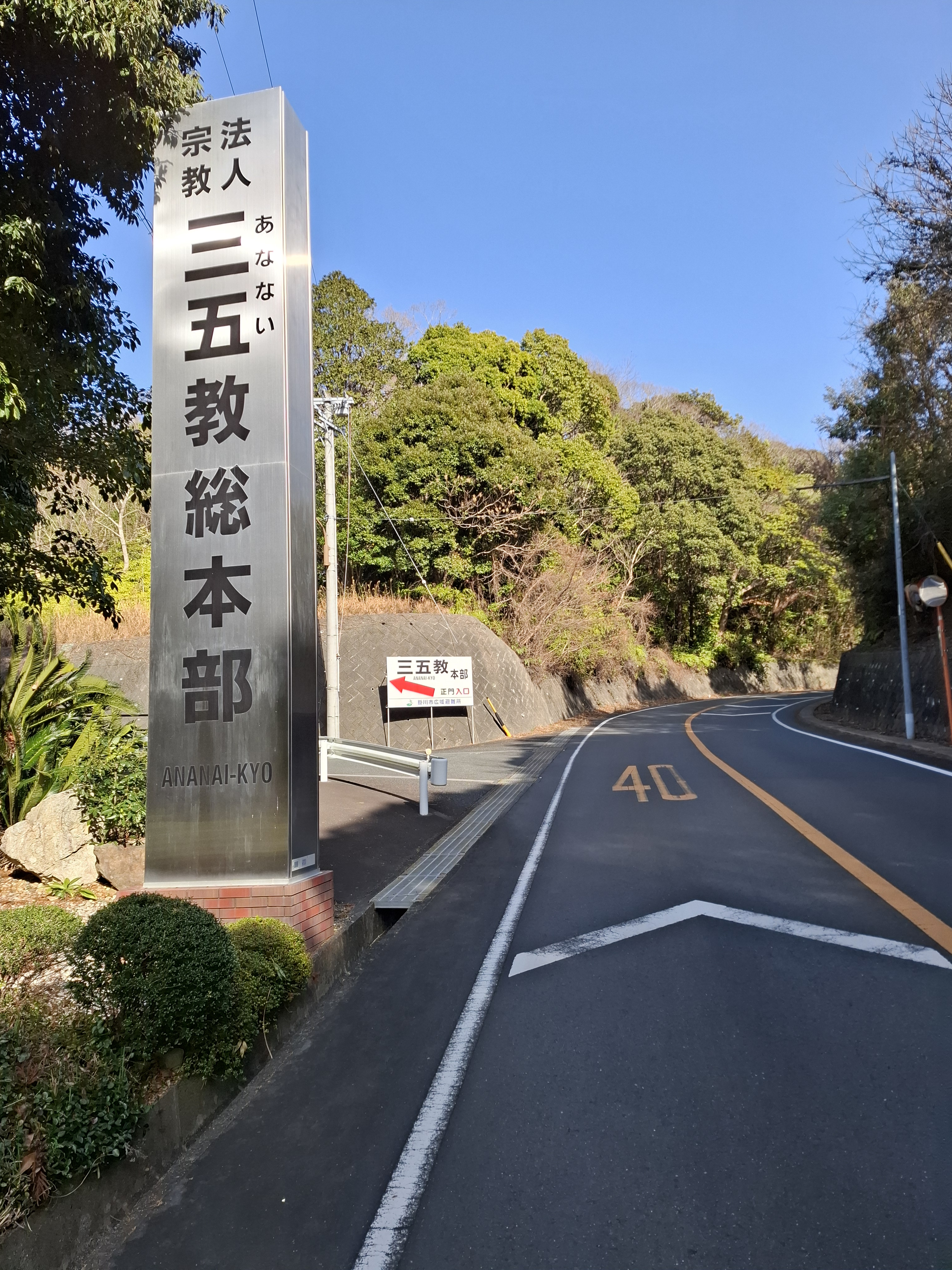
The entrance to Ananaikyo's current headquarters at Yokosuka, Kakegawa, Shizuoka Prefecture

Ananaikyo (Japanese: 三五教, Hepburn: Ananai-kyō; lit. 'Three-Five Religion') is a Shinto-based shinshūkyō (Japanese new religion) derived from Oomoto. Ananaikyo was established by Yonosuke Nakano (中野與之助) on April 1949 in Shimizu, Shizuoka. It is currently headquartered in Yokosuka in Kakegawa, Shizuoka.

== History ==
The religion's founder was Yonosuke Nakano (中野與之助) 1887–1974), who was originally an Oomoto practitioner. Nakano was influenced by Shinto priest and spirit medium Honda Chikaatsu (本田親徳) (1822–1889) and Honda's disciple Nagasawa Katsutate (長澤雄楯) (1858–1940). Honda and Nagasawa taught a type of meditation (and/or spirit possession) practice known as chinkon kishin (鎮魂帰神) (lit. 'calming the soul and returning to the divine'), which is also practiced in Shintō Tenkōkyo and Oomoto.

On April 4, 1949, Nakano founded Ananaikyo in Shimizu, Shizuoka. Ananaikyo's original headquarters in Shimizu was located less than 100 meters from Yamanashi Kasamori Inari Jinja (月見里笠森稲荷神社) (note that 月見里 has the reading "Yamanashi"), the Shinto shrine where Nagasawa Katsutate had spent most of life practicing at.

=== World Religion Congress ===
During the mid-1950s, Ananaikyo held a series of World Religion Congress meetings at its headquarters in Shimizu, Shizuoka. Reports were published for each of the eight congresses from 1954 to 1956.

- 1st–3rd World Religion Congresses – 1954
- 4th–6th World Religion Congresses – 1955
- 7th–8th World Religion Congresses – 1956

Shin Negami (根上 信; 1897–1969) was the president of the Ananaikyo International Headquarters (三五教国際総本部) during the mid-1950s when the congresses were held.

=== 1960s–present ===
Beginning in the 1960s, Nakano started to focus more on the international development NGO that he had founded, OISCA International. After his death in 1974, his adopted daughter Nakano Yoshiko (中野良子, born 1933) became the religious leader of Ananaikyo. Nakano Yoshiko resigned in 1982 to focus on being President of OISCA International. In May 1983, Nakano Masamiya (中野正宫, born 1950) became Ananaikyo's third religious leader. Since the 1980s, Ananaikyo has not regained the international prominence that it had once enjoyed during the 1950s and 1960s, partly because the religion's leaders, who had become highly involved with the non-religious NGO OISCA International, did not want OISCA to be publicly associated with a religion and thereby potentially harming the NGO's reputation. As a result, Ananaikyo leaders stopped organizing international events and restricted chinkon kishin for experienced members only, whereas in the past the general public could openly participate in Ananaikyo's chinkon kishin. For instance, currently the chinkon stone (鎮魂石, chinkon seki), a sacred object owned by some Ananaikyo members, is a private object that cannot be shown to non-members.

During the 21st century, Ananaikyo moved its headquarters from Shimizu, Shizuoka to the Yokosuka area of Kakegawa, Shizuoka. The Shimizu location is now used as a regular branch for members to congregate, while the main administrative offices and temple facilities are all located in Kakegawa. As of 2026, the current director of Ananaikyo is Yasunosuke Amano (天野 保之助). At the new Kakegawa headquarters, the main worship hall is known as the Chinkon Dōjō (鎮魂道場). The main enshrined deity is Kunitokotachi-no-Mikoto. The spirit of Yonosuke Nakano is enshrined as a deity in an auxiliary shrine (34°41′24.3″N 137°58′44.8″E) just to the east of the Chinkon Dōjō.

== Spiritual lineage ==
Ananaikyo's Spirit Studies (霊学, Reigaku) (or "Honda spiritualist studies" (本田霊学, Honda reigaku)) lineage is as follows. Each successor would continue the teachings of his or her teacher after the teacher's death or resignation.

1. Honda Chikaatsu (本田親徳) (1822–1889)
2. Nagasawa Katsutate (長澤雄楯) (1858–1940)
3. Nakano Yonosuke (中野與之助) (1887–1974)
4. Nakano Yoshiko (中野良子) (born 1933)
5. Nakano Masamiya (中野正宫) (born 1950)
The Spirit Studies lineage

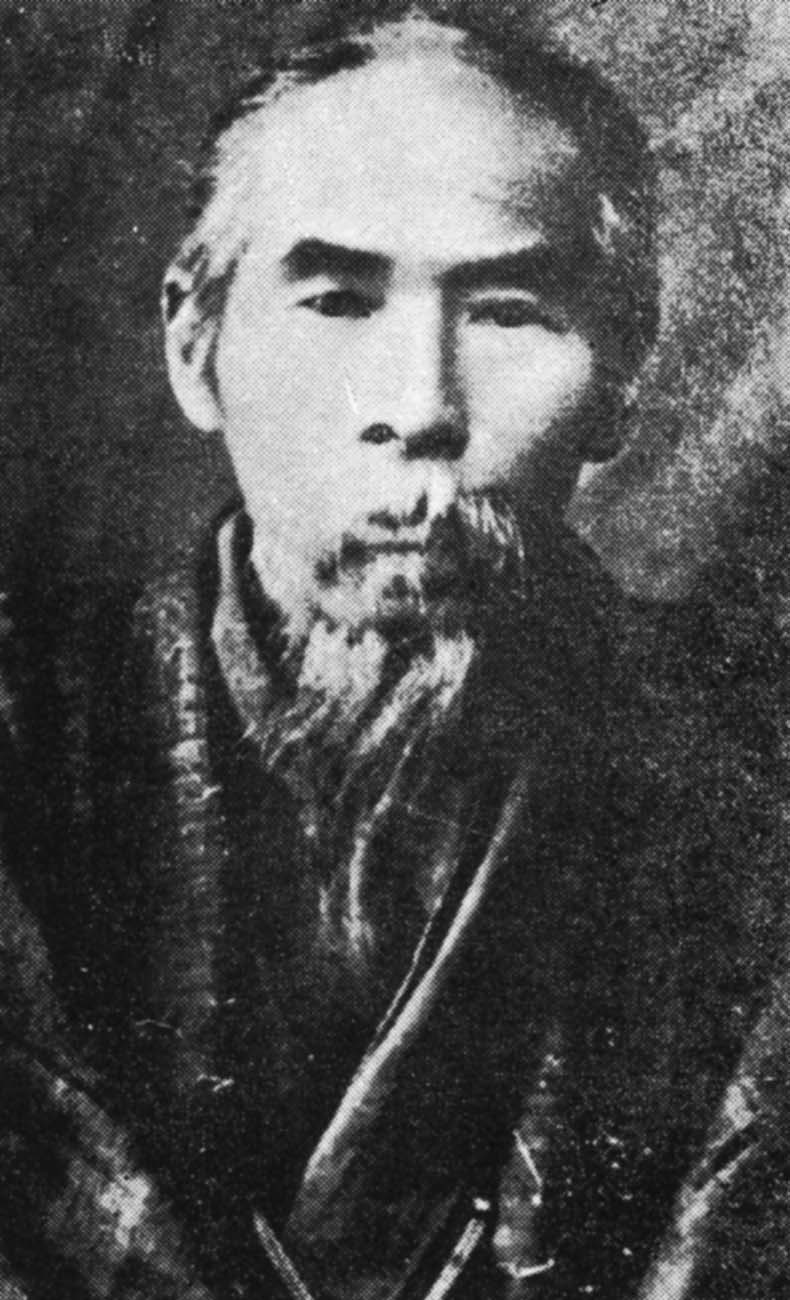
Honda Chikaatsu

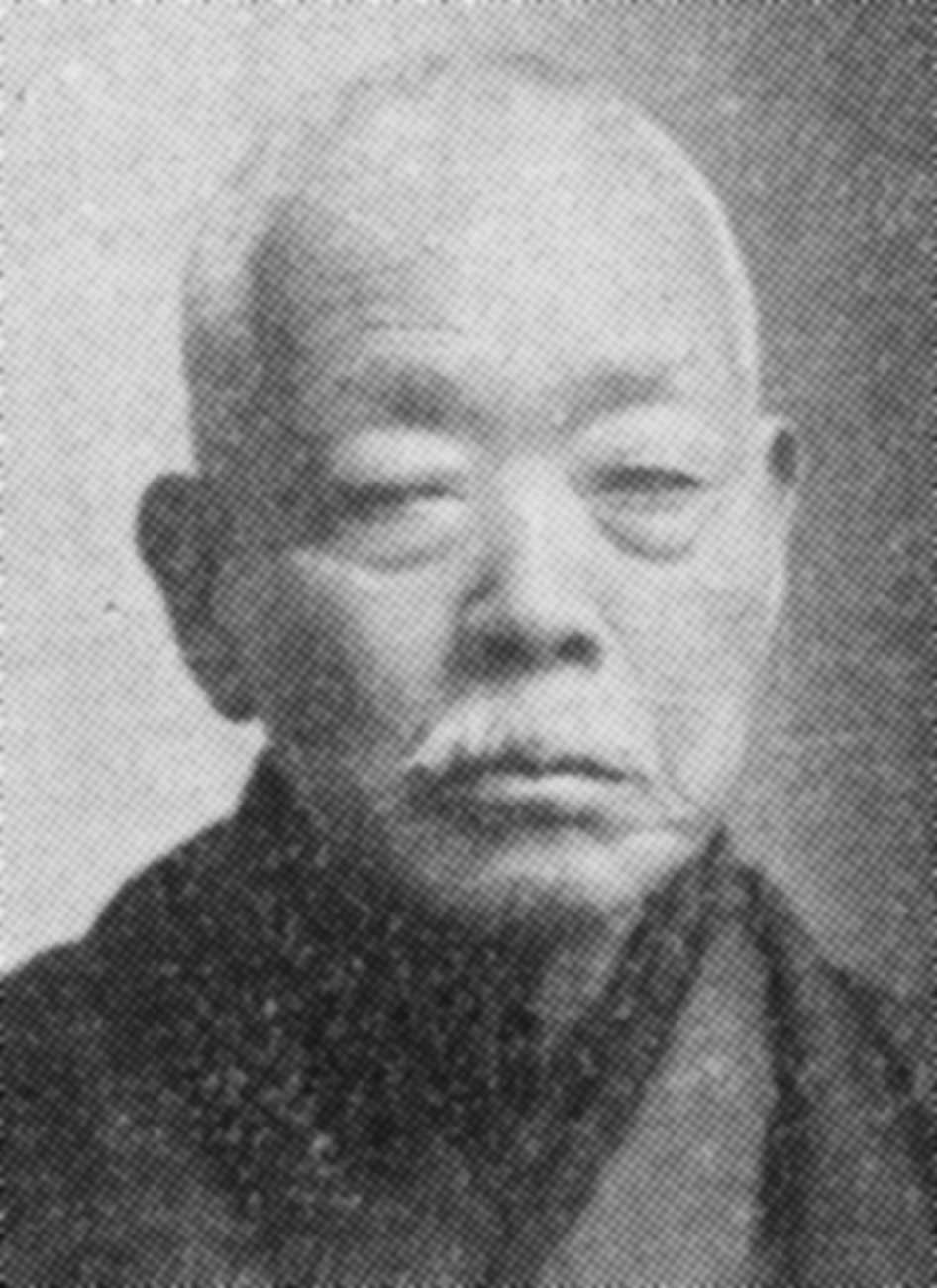
Nagasawa Katsutate

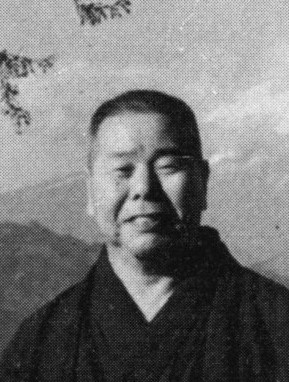
Nakano Yonosuke

== Beliefs and practices ==
Ananaikyo's teachings, practices, and texts closely resemble those of Oomoto. The supreme God of the universe in Ananaikyo is known as the Great Spirit of the Universe (宇宙大精神, uchū daiseishin), or uchū tairei (宇宙大霊).

The name Ananaikyo, along with its corresponding kanji gloss 三五教, originates from Oomoto. Numerous passages in the Reikai Monogatari, written during the 1920s and 1930s by Onisaburo Deguchi, use Ananaikyo (三五教) to refer to the Oomoto religion. The term ananai refers to a thick rope that is attached to the bell of a haiden (worship hall of a Shinto shrine).

The kanji characters used to represent the name Ananaikyo (三五教) literally mean "three [and] five religion", with "three" representing the triad of the sun, moon, and stars, and "five" representing the five elements of wood, fire, earth, metal, and water. At the Chinkon Dōjō (鎮魂道場), on one side of the main altar, there is a flag that has a red sun, blue crescent moon, and yellow five-pointed star representing the "three" in Ananaikyo (三五教), while on the other side of the altar there is a flag representing the "five" in Ananaikyo (三五教). Thus, "three and five" represent the teachings of both heaven and earth. The "three" (三) in Ananaikyo (三五教) can also symbolize the three new religions that Ananaikyo was influenced by, namely Oomoto, Guiyidao, and the Baháʼí Faith, while "five" (五) refers to five established world religions, namely Buddhism, Confucianism, Judaism, Christianity, and Islam. Nakano's familiarity with Guiyidao and the Baháʼí Faith comes from his time as an Oomoto follower before World War II, when Oomoto leader Onisaburo Deguchi had frequent contact with the two religions during the 1920s and 1930s.

Like Oomoto, Ananaikyo considers all world religions to be of the same divine origin. Young (1988) reported that Ananaikyo's main worship hall in Shizuoka gave recognition to Buddhism, Christianity, Islam, Judaism, and Shinto.

Ananaikyo does not preach any worldly benefits, but rather places an emphasis on harmony with nature. The main scripture of Ananaikyo is Reikai-de Mita Uchū (霊界で観た宇宙; "The universe viewed from the world of spirit"), which consists of 13 volumes.

The main deities revered are:

- Kuni-no-Tokotachi (国常立大神)
- Ōkuninushi (大国主大神)
- Daimichihiko-no-Mikoto (大道彦命)
- Konohanasakuya-hime (木花咲耶姫大神)
- Ame-no-Uzume (天宇受売大神)
- Sarutahiko Ōkami (猿田彦大神)
- Ame-no-Tajikarao (天手力男大神)
- Tamayori-hime (玉依姫大神)

In Ananaikyo, a type of meditation called chinkon kishin (鎮魂帰神), also known simply as chinkon (鎮魂), is practiced. Chinkon kishin was originally practiced in Oomoto, and is restricted to Ananaikyo followers who have been members for at least three years.

A chinkon stone is required to perform chinkon kishin in Ananaikyo. The chinkon stone must be a small, spherical black stone collected at Shimizu's Miho Pine Forest (三保松原, Miho no Matsubara), from which a forested sandō leads to Miho Shrine (御穗神社, Miho jinja) where Nagasawa had been a head priest at. Finding a suitable stone can often take several hours, and the search is supervised by an Ananaikyo senior member.

== Observatories ==
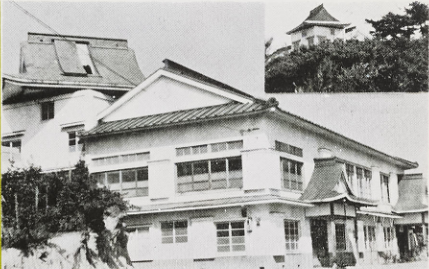
The Kuniharu Observatory (国治天文台) in Okazaki, Aichi Prefecture, built around 1960

Unusually for a Shinto-derived religion, Ananaikyo is known for building several astronomical observatories in Japan, since Ananaikyo states that "astronomy is religion" (天文即宗教, Tenmon Soku Shūkyō). In 1957, an observatory was built on Kanukiyama (香貫山) in Numazu, Shizuoka Prefecture but was later demolished in 1973 due to opposition against the new religion from locals. Other observatories built by Ananaikyo, many of which are now defunct, include:

- Gekko Observatory (月光天文台) in Kannami, Tagata District, Shizuoka Prefecture
- Kuniharu Observatory (国治天文台) in Okazaki, Aichi Prefecture
- Western Observatory (西部天文台) in Chikugo, Fukuoka Prefecture (established in November 1957, renamed Kyushu Observatory (九州天文台) in January 1958, closed in 1992)
- Bizan Observatory (眉山天文台) in Tokushima (established in March 1958, closed in 1968)
- Oshu Observatory (奥州天文台) in Nihonmatsu, Fukushima Prefecture (established in April 1958, closed in 1991)
- Nobi Observatory (濃尾天文台) in Tajimi, Gifu Prefecture (established in November 1958, closed in 1991)
- Tohoku Observatory (東北天文台) in Kitakami, Iwate Prefecture (established in February 1959; demolished in 1996)
- Hi-no-kuni Observatory (肥之国天文台) in Yamaga, Kumamoto Prefecture (established in 1960; demolished in 1983)
- Shinano Observatory (信濃天文台) in Okaya, Nagano Prefecture (established in 1963; still standing as of 2015 but not open to the public)

== Publications ==
Japanese-language publications by Yonosuke Nakano include:

- 三五の教義 (1954) ("Doctrine of Ananaikyo")
- 産業の宗教 (1963) ("Religion of Industry")
- 人類完成の歓び (1965) ("The Joy of Human Perfection")
- 霊観した幽界 (1965) ("Spiritual Observation of the Hidden World")
- 世界救済の大道 (1965) ("The Way to World Salvation")
- 日本人の和を願う (1972) ("Wishing for Harmony among the Japanese people")

=== Reikai-de Mita Uchū ===
The Reikai-de Mita Uchū (霊界で観た宇宙) is a series of 13 volumes published by Yonosuke Nakano from 1965 to 1967. The first few volumes were also published in the 1950s. Occasionally, some volumes in the series are also titled Reikai-kara Mita Uchū (霊界から見た宇宙). The volumes in the series are:

- 霊界から見た宇宙 (1965) – Volumes 1–4: The Universe as Seen from the Spirit World
- 天文 (1966) – Volume 5: Astronomy
- 本命の宗教 (1966) – Volume 6: The Foremost Religion
- 霊・神・人 (1966) – Volume 7: Spirit, God, Humanity
- 金木・菅曽・太祝詞 (1966) – Volume 8: Prayers
- 精神産業と産業精 (1966) – Volume 9: Religion and Industrial Spirit
- 高天原に神留坐す (1966) – Volume 10: God in Heaven
- 霊学・霊智霊覚・神人合一 (1967) – Volume 11: Spiritual science, spiritual wisdom, spiritual awareness, union of God with humanity
- 人類の繁栄と平和への道 : 精神と知識科学 (1967) – Volume 12: The path to human prosperity and peace: Mind and science of knowledge
- 大教育・精神教化 (1967) – Volume 13: The Great Education, Spiritual Education

=== English translations ===
A few of Nakano's books have been translated into English:

- Nakano, Yonosuke (1954). Negami, Shin (ed.). The universe has the spirit: volume 2. Shimizu, Shizuoka: The International General Headquarters of Ananai-Kyo.
- Nakano, Yonosuke (1957). Negami, Shin (ed.). The universe viewed from the world of spirit: volume 5. Translated by Miyoshi, S. Shimizu, Shizuoka: The Ananaikyo International Headquarters.
- The Ananai: A Journal for Truth Seekers (1956–1959) (in Japanese: あなない : 宗教法人三五教機関誌)
- Religion and Industrial Spirit (English translation of the 1966 book 精神産業と産業精, which is Volume 9 of 霊界で観た宇宙)

== See also ==
- Shinto sects and schools
- Shintō Tenkōkyo
