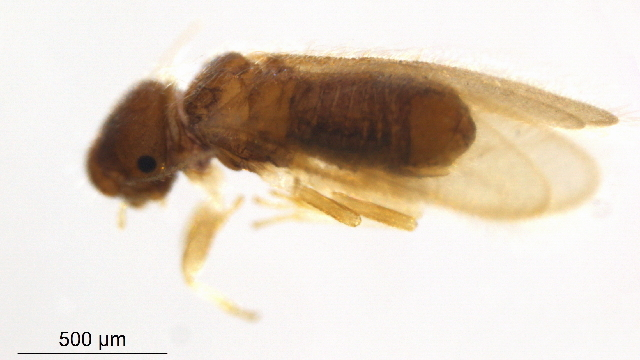
- Archipsocus nomas

Scientific classification
- Kingdom: Animalia
- Phylum: Arthropoda
- Clade: Pancrustacea
- Class: Insecta
- Order: Psocodea
- Suborder: Psocomorpha
- Infraorder: Archipsocetae
- Family: Archipsocidae; Pearman, 1936

Genera
- Archipsocopsis; Archipsocus; Notarchipsocus; Pararchipsocus; Pseudarchipsocus

= Archipsocidae =

Family of booklice

Archipsocidae is a family of barklice of the order Psocodea (formerly Psocoptera) belonging to the suborder Psocomorpha. Members of the family are characterized by their reduced wing venation. Some species are viviparous. The family includes about 80 species in five genera.

== Characteristics ==
Barklice in Archipsocidae typically range from 1.2–1.8 millimetres (0.047–0.071 in) in length. They have small appendages at the end of their legs called tarsi that are segmented into two pieces. Archipsocidae can have different appearing wings for different individuals in a phenomenon called alary polymorphism.

== Sources ==
- Lienhard, C. & Smithers, C. N. 2002. Psocoptera (Insecta): World Catalogue and Bibliography. Instrumenta Biodiversitatis, vol. 5. Muséum d'histoire naturelle, Genève.
