= Tomokiyo Yoshisane =

Japanese religious leader (1888–1952)

- 友清 歓真
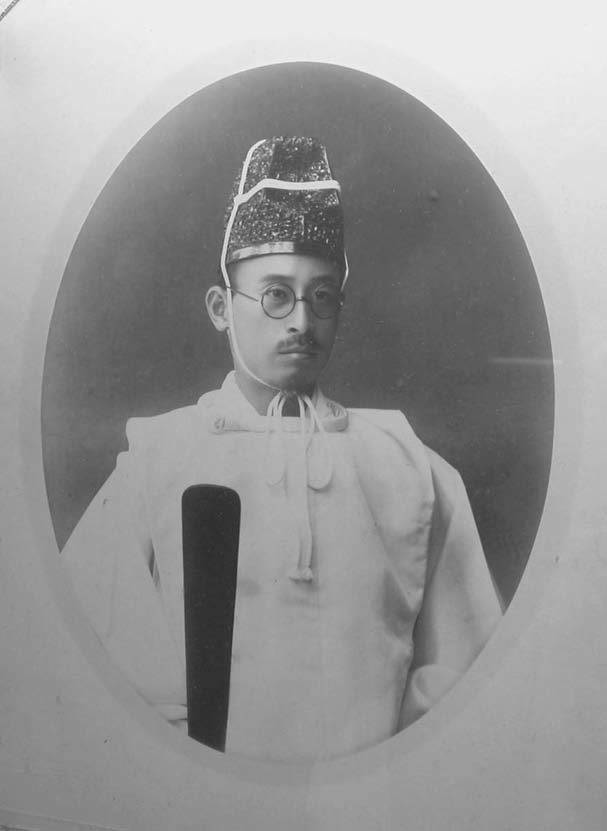
- Tomokiyo Yoshisane
- Title: Sōshu (宗主)

Personal life
- Born: Tomokiyo Kugo (友清 九吾); October 9, 1888 Yamaguchi, Yamaguchi Prefecture
- Died: February 15, 1952 (aged 63) Hōfu, Yamaguchi Prefecture
- Resting place: Banzan Jinja (磐山神社), Mount Iwaki, Hikari, Yamaguchi; 33°59′10.2″N 132°02′15.0″E
- Home town: Yamaguchi Prefecture
- Notable work(s): The essence of chinkon kishin (鎮魂帰神の極意, Chinkon kishin no gokui); A Guide to Spirit Studies (霊学筌蹄, Reigaku sentei)
- Known for: Founding Shintō Tenkōkyo

Religious life
- Religion: Shintō Tenkōkyo

Senior posting
- Teacher: Nagasawa Katsutate (長澤雄楯)

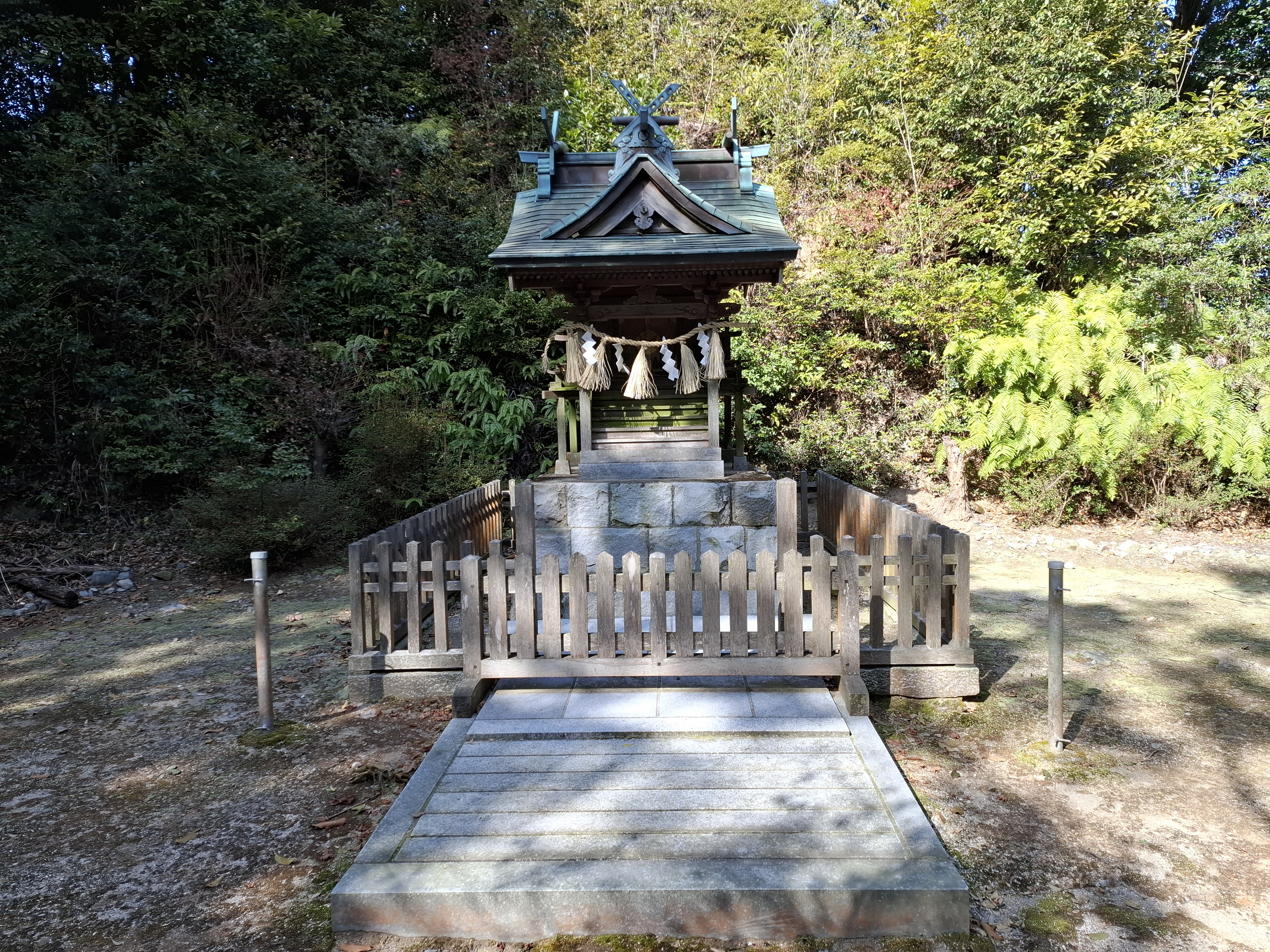
The spirit of Tomokiyo Yoshisane is deified as Okitamahiko no Mikoto (氣玉顏命) at Banzan Jinja (磐山神社) on Mount Iwaki.

Tomokiyo Yoshisane (Japanese: 友清歓真; October 9, 1888 – February 15, 1952), also known as Tomokiyo Banzan (友清磐山) or Tomokiyo Kugo (友清九吾), was a Japanese religious leader known for founding the Shintō Tenkōkyo religion in 1920.

== Biography ==
Tomokiyo was born on October 9, 1888 in Sayama (佐山), now part of the city of Yamaguchi. He was the second son of a tailor and dyer and was given the name Kugo (九吾). As a child who suffered from poor health, he took an interest in philosophy and literature. His father died in 1895 when he was about 11 years old. At around the same time, he experienced kamikakushi (神隠し) (lit. 'being hidden by a deity'). During the 1910s, Tomokiyo often engaged in mountain retreats in present-day Yamaguchi Prefecture and Kumamoto Prefecture to study divination, meditation, and martial arts. He was also active in politics in Tokyo and Shimonoseki during the start of the Taisho era. Tomokiyo also became familiar with Shugendō and Shingon Buddhism teachings and practices during his time spent on Mount Hiko in Kyushu during the 1910s.

In 1918, Tomokiyo became an editor for Oomoto's Shinreikai (神霊界) and Ayabe shinbun (綾部新聞) while living at Ayabe. He became a close friend of Asano Wasaburō and also performed chinkon kishin sessions. Only one year after in 1919, Tomokiyo left Oomoto. He published criticisms of Oomoto, stating that its doctrines were copied from the writings and teachings of Honda Chikaatsu (1822–1889), that Ayabe was not the earthly manifestation of Takamagahara, and that Oomoto did not properly revere the emperor. Upon leaving Oomoto, Tomokiyo went to Shimizu to study chinkon kishin and Honda Chikaatsu's teachings under Nagasawa Katsutate (長澤雄楯). He also spent some time on Aoshima, an island in Miyazaki Prefecture, during the summer of 1919. While studying with Nagasawa, Tomokiyo claimed to have continuously received revelations directly from the spirits of Honda Chikaatsu and various other deceased spiritual teachers, as well as the kami Ame-no-Uzume. In February 1920, he founded the religious organization Kakushin-kai (格神会) in Shizuoka. It was renamed as Tenkōkyo (天行居) in October 1921.

On November 22, 1927, while worshipping Ōyamatsumi at Iwaki Jinja (石城神社) on Mount Iwaki near Tabuse, Yamaguchi Prefecture, he received a divine revelation to utilize Mount Iwaki as Shintō Tenkōkyo's main center. This divine revelation is known as Sanjō no tenkei (山上の天啓) or Tō no mioshie (十の御教).

In 1928, Tomokiyo moved Shintō Tenkōkyo from Shizuoka to Tabuse and constructed several shrines on Mount Iwaki starting from around 1930.

== Later years and death ==
After resigning as the leader of Shintō Tenkōkyo in 1931, Tomokiyo relocated to Miyaichi (宮市), now part of the city of Hōfu in Yamaguchi Prefecture. There, he lived a secluded life studying and writing at his residence. He died on February 15, 1952. Shortly afterwards on May 25, 1952, Banzan Jinja (磐山神社), a massha shrine, was officially erected on Mount Iwaki to enshrine his deified spirit, the kami Okitamahiko no Mikoto (氣玉顏命). Upon his death, his wife Tomokiyo Misao (友清操; 1899–1990, born Akahori Misao 赤堀操) became the leader of Shinto Tenkokyo. In April 1952, Shintō Tenkōkyo was officially incorporated as a religious organization.

== Writings ==
After Tomokiyo's death, his works were compiled in the multi-volume anthology Tomokiyo Yoshisane zenshū (友清歓真全集) (lit. 'The Complete Works of Tomokiyo Yoshisane'), of which there are three different editions.

== Family ==
Tomokiyo Yoshisane was married to Tomokiyo Misao (友清操; 1899–1990), who was born Akahori Misao (赤堀操). She became the leader of Shintō Tenkōkyo after her husband died in 1952.
