= Euxoa nomas =

Scientific classification
- Kingdom: Animalia
- Phylum: Arthropoda
- Class: Insecta
- Order: Lepidoptera
- Superfamily: Noctuoidea
- Family: Noctuidae
- Genus: Euxoa
- Species: E. nomas

Binomial name
- Euxoa nomas Erschoff, 1874

Synonyms
- Agrotiphila incognita; Orosagrotis incognita; Euxoa incognita

Species of moth

Euxoa nomas is a species of moth of the family Noctuidae described by Nikolay Grigoryevich Erschoff in 1874. It is found in Iran and Turkestan, as well as Alaska and Canada.

Between 1987 (Note: per Lafontaine, 1987) and 2010, (Note: per Lafontaine & Schmidt, 2010) the populations of this species were considered to be two separate subspecies, Euxoa nomas nomas in Asia and Euxoa nomas incognita in North America.
