= Noma Dōjō =

Coordinates: 35°43′05″N 139°43′36″E

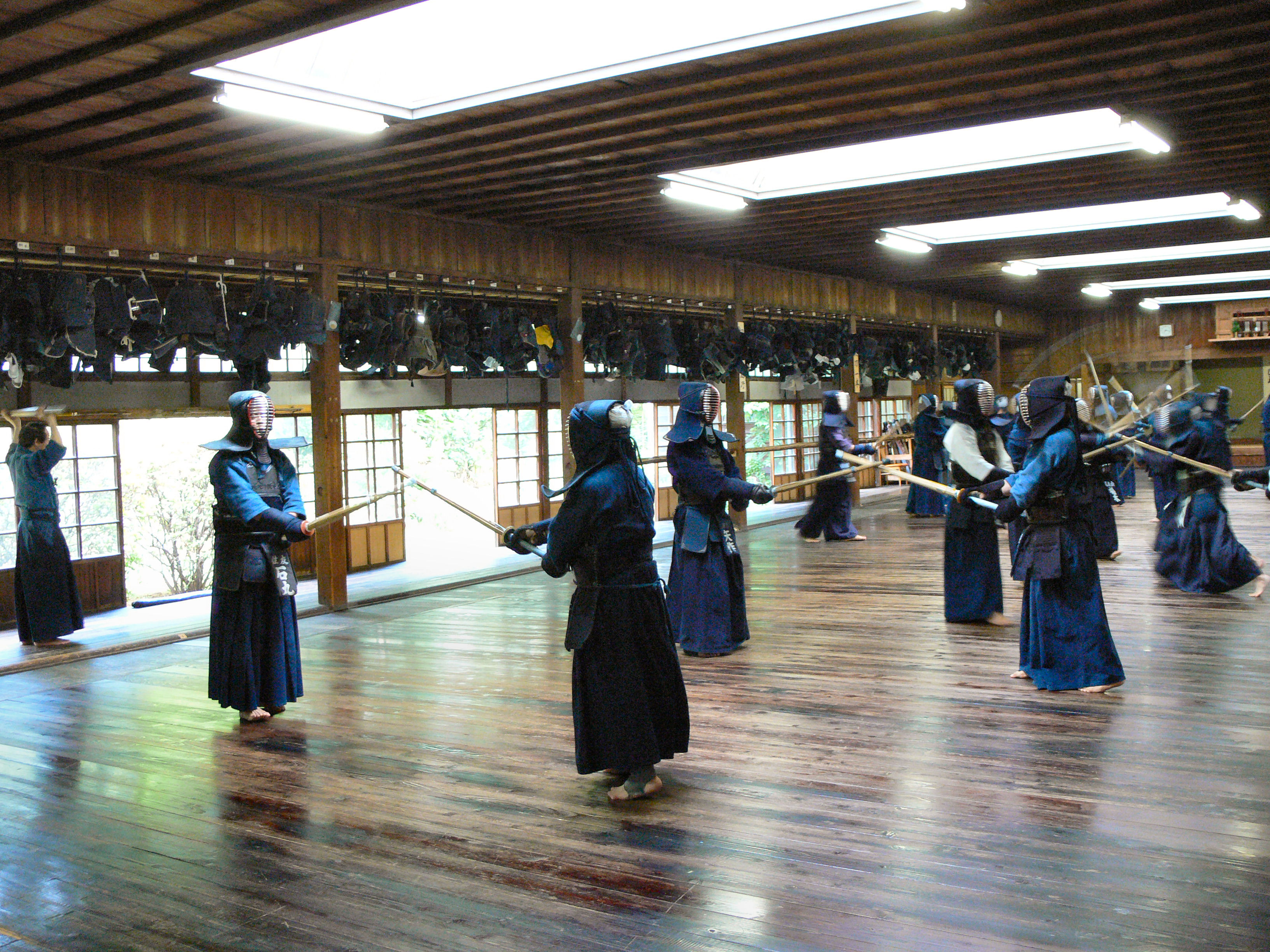
Kendō fencers at a morning practice in Noma Dōjō

Noma Dōjō (野間道場) is a privately owned kendo training hall, or dōjō, located in Tokyo's Bunkyo ward close to Gokoku-ji. The original Noma Dojo was established in 1925 by Seiji Noma, founder of the Kodansha publishing house, but demolished by the company in late 2007 and replaced with a modern training hall in a neighbouring office building.

The original hall had long been one of the most celebrated kendo dōjō in Japan. Core elements of the building dated from an Edo period dōjō previously located at a different site. It was the only example of its type to survive into the 21st century and has been described by Japanese media as a "holy place" for kendo enthusiasts.

The hall had a number of unusual design features, including glass-doored walls on two sides that open onto gardens, deep skylights and a specially sprung wooden floor. The long and relatively narrow shape of the hall meant it was ideal for kendo practices involving a single row of paired-off fencers.

In an article in Japan's Nihon Keizai Shimbun published on September 15, 2006, former Kodansha chairman Toshiyuki Hattori wrote that the publishing house had decided to demolish Noma Dojo as part of a redevelopment of the company compound. Hattori appealed for the company to reconsider its plans, saying the dōjō was a place where the "fragrant, darkly lustrous wood" was "permeated with the blood and sweat of famous fencers". Architects, conservationists and some public figures also called for the hall to be preserved or at least moved to a new site.

However, by October 2007, Kodansha had completed the demolition of a nearby early-20th aristocratic villa and the construction on the site of a new office building with a fifth-floor dōjō. Late appeals for the Noma Dojo hall to be preserved by moving it to Seiji Noma's hometown resulted only in agreement to transfer its porch. The rest of the building was razed by early December.

Apart from its architectural value, Noma Dōjō has been celebrated for the excellence of its teachers, including the late Moriji Mochida, a holder of the 10th Dan rank who was known as a "master swordsman of the Shōwa period". As well as being used by the Kodansha kendo club, the hall has for decades held a daily 7 a.m. practice that is open to kendo fencers from any school or association.

Kodansha has said the morning practice will continue in the new dōjō, which was designed to reflect some of the features of the old hall, including the use of skylights.
