= Chinkon kishin =

Japanese religious practice

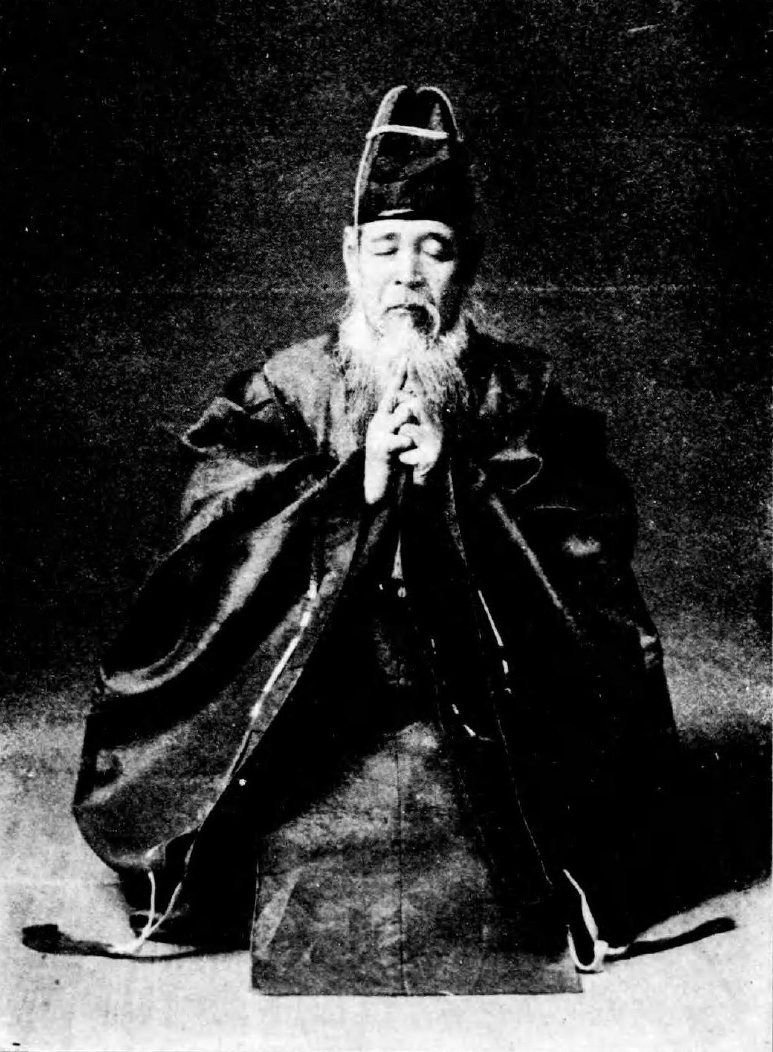
A man performing chinkon kishin during the early 20th century

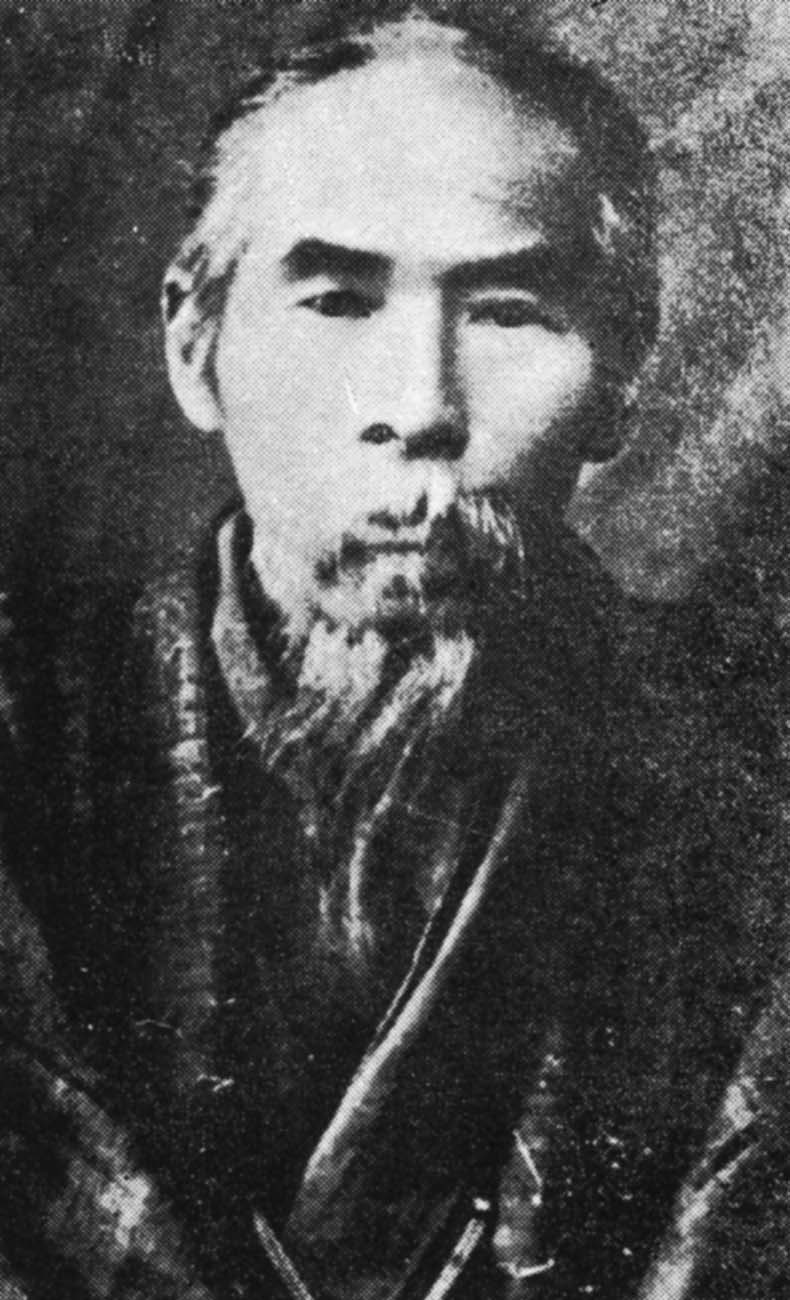
Chikaatsu Honda, who originally taught chinkon kishin

Chinkon kishin (鎮魂帰神) is a Japanese religious practice that consists of two components, chinkon (鎮魂) (lit. 'calming the soul', i.e. meditation) and kishin (帰神) (lit. 'returning to the divine', i.e. spirit possession). It originated in Japan during the 19th century and was first taught and practiced by Chikaatsu Honda. In 1898, Onisaburo Deguchi, the founder of the Oomoto religion, learned chinkon kishin from Honda's disciple Katsutate Nagasawa (長澤雄楯) and popularized it during the early 20th century. Chinkon kishin was widely practiced in Oomoto from 1916 to 1921, during which the phrase began to be widely used. The basic practices of several Shinto-based Japanese new religions are derived from chinkon kishin. Chinkon kishin is still practiced in more or less its original form in Shintō Tenkōkyo and Ananaikyo, whereas it is highly modified in present-day Oomoto.

During kishin, or spirit possession, a mediator known as the saniwa (審神者) questions the deity in the possessed person (spirit medium), known as the kannushi (神主) (note that the term kannushi is instead used to refer to a shrine caretaker and priest in mainstream Shinto). Currently, the Japanese new religions Makoto no Michi, Shirakawa Gakkan (白川学館), and Yamakage Shinto also have similar practices.

== History ==
Chinkon kishin was originally taught as the separate components of chinkon and kishin by Chikaatsu Honda (1822–1889) during the 19th century, who in turn derived many of his ideas from his teachers Seishisai Aizawa and Atsutane Hirata. Honda then taught chinkon and kishin to his disciple Katsutate Nagasawa (長澤雄楯) (1858–1940). In turn, Nagasawa taught it directly to Onisaburo Deguchi (出口王仁三郎, the founder of Oomoto, who merged the two practices into chinkon kishin), Yoshisane Tomokiyo (友清歓真, born Kyūgo Tomokiyo 友清九吾; the founder of Shintō Tenkōkyo), and Yonosuke Nakano (中野與之助, the founder of Ananaikyo). Shintō Tenkōkyo and Ananaikyo both still practice chinkon kishin, although participation is restricted to members and is not open to the general public. In present-day Oomoto, only the chinkon (鎮魂) aspect is practiced as a form of meditation, but not the kishin (帰神) aspect of spirit possession.

Chinkon kishin was widely taught to Oomoto followers by Onisaburo Deguchi from 1916 to 1921 until the Japanese government cracked down on the practice during the First Oomoto Incident of 1921. In 1923, Deguchi banned chinkon kishin and replaced it with miteshiro o-toritsugi (み手代お取次), which involved the use of rice ladles. This practice would go on to form the basis of johrei and okiyome in later Oomoto-derived religions that make use of the "laying of hands" to channel divine light for spiritual healing.

Onisaburo Deguchi taught chinkon kishin to Masaharu Taniguchi (谷口雅春), founder of Seicho-no-Ie, and Mokichi Okada (岡田茂吉), founder of the Church of World Messianity. Johrei (浄霊) as practiced by the Church of World Messianity is directly based on chinkon kishin, while the chinkon (meditation) aspect of chinkon kishin forms the basis of shinsōkan (神想観) in Seicho-no-Ie. The practice of johrei in turn inspired Kōtama Okada, founder of the Mahikari movement, to invent the similar practice of okiyome (お浄め).

== Religions ==
The following Japanese new religions derive their basic teachings and practices from chinkon kishin and its derirative practices, as taught to their founders by Nagasawa, Deguchi, or Okada.

- Oomoto
- Ananaikyo
- Shintō Tenkōkyo
- Seicho-No-Ie
- "Divine light" (johrei / okiyome-practicing) religions
  - Church of World Messianity and related splinter groups such as Shinji Shumeikai
  - Mahikari movement religions (including Sukyo Mahikari and World Divine Light)

Yamakage Shinto (山蔭神道), a Shinto sect that was led by Motohisa Yamakage (山蔭基央) during the late 20th century, also teaches chinkon meditation. The Shinto sect, headquartered at Kirei-gū (貴嶺宮) in Kōta, Aichi Prefecture, is associated with the modern koshintō (古神道) revival movement. Chinkon meditation in Yamakage Shinto is performed while seated on the floor and is performed using techniques such as breathing exercises, counting numbers, mudras, meditating on a mirror, and ritual chanting.

Chinkon is also practiced in Shinseidō (神仙道), a religious philosophy and movement founded by Miyaji Suii (宮地水位).

== Academic studies ==
Chinkon kishin has been thoroughly studied in a 2009 monograph by Birgit Staemmler, which is the published revision of her 2002 doctoral dissertation written at the University of Tübingen. A detailed treatment of chinkon kishin can also be found in Nancy K. Stalker's 2008 biography about Onisaburo Deguchi, Prophet Motive. The history of chinkon kishin has also been studied in a doctoral dissertation by Namiki (2020).

== See also ==
- Spiritualism (movement)
