= Kitamura =

Kitamura (written: 北村, lit. "northern village") is a Japanese surname. Notable people with the surname include:

- Akihiro Kitamura (born 1979), Japanese actor and director
- Akira Kitamura, game director
- Eiji Kitamura (born 1929), Japanese jazz clarinetist
- Eiki Kitamura (born 1981), Japanese actor
- Eri Kitamura (born 1987), Japanese voice actress and singer
- Harue Kitamura (born 1928), Mayor of Ashiya, Hyogo
- Kazuki Kitamura (born 1969), Japanese film and television actor
- Kōichi Kitamura (1931–2007), Japanese voice actor
- Kusuo Kitamura (1917–1996), Japanese swimmer who competed at the 1932 Summer Olympics
- Kyoko Kitamura, musician residing in New York City
- Ryuhei Kitamura (born 1969), Japanese filmmaker
- Ryuji Kitamura (born 1981), Japanese football player
- Satoshi Kitamura, renowned children's picture book author and illustrator
- Sayo Kitamura (1900–1967), founder of the Tensho Kotai Jingukyo
- Seigo Kitamura (born 1947), Japanese politician of the Liberal Democratic Party
- Shigeo Kitamura (born 1945), Japanese politician of the Liberal Democratic Party
- Siro Kitamura (1906–2002), Japanese botanist
- Kitamura Takumi (北村匠海, born 1997), Japanese singer, model, and actor.
- Tatsuo Kitamura (北村 辰夫; born 1940), Japanese cross-country skier
- Kitamura Tokoku (1868–1894), poet, essayist and one of the founders of the modern Japanese romantic literary movement in late Meiji period Japan
- Tomotaka Kitamura (born 1982), Japanese football player
- Yasuo Kitamura (北村 康雄; born 1932), Japanese swimmer

== See also ==
- Kita, Hokkaidō (Kita-mura), a village located in Sorachi District, Sorachi, Japan
- Reticulate acropigmentation of Kitamura, linear palmar pits and pigmented macules 1 to 4 mm in diameter on the volar and dorsal aspects of the hands and feet
- Kitamura-gumi, a yakuza gang who committed the Ōmuta murders
