= Tabuse Station =

Railway station in Yanai, Yamaguchi Prefecture, Japan

Tabuse Station 田布施駅
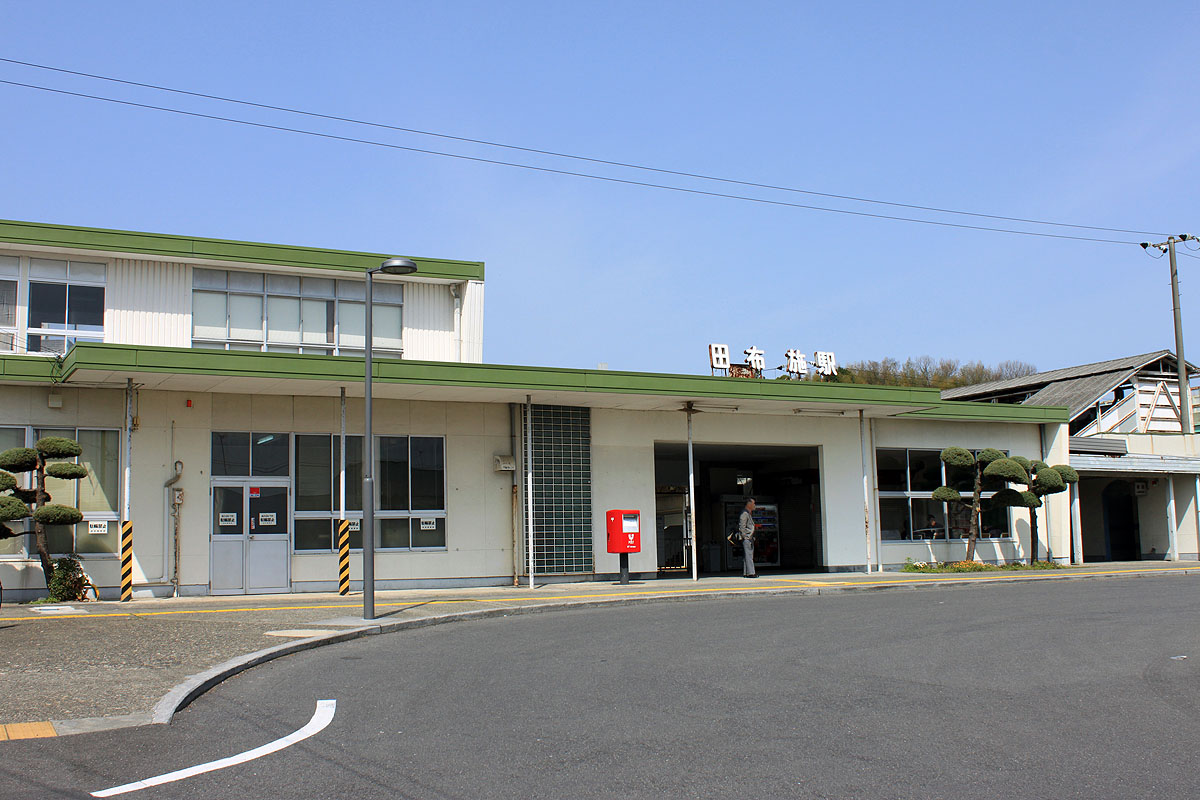
- Tabuse Station in March 2010

General information
- Location: 381-1 Hano, Tabuse-cho, Kumage-gun, Yamaguchi-ken 742-1502; Japan
- Coordinates: 33°57′31.259″N 132°2′39.023″E
- Owner: West Japan Railway Company
- Operator: West Japan Railway Company
- Line: San'yō Line
- Distance: 385.4 km (239.5 miles) from Kobe
- Platforms: 2 side platforms
- Tracks: 2
- Connections: Bus stop

Construction
- Accessible: Yes

Other information
- Status: Unstaffed
- Website: Official website

History
- Opened: 25 September 1897; 129 years ago

Passengers
- FY2022: 987

Services
Preceding station	JR West	Following station
Iwata towards Shimonoseki	San'yō Line Local	Yanai towards Iwakuni
Location
- Location within Yamaguchi Prefecture Location within Japan

Tabuse Station (田布施駅, Tabuse-eki) is a passenger railway station located in the town of Tabuse, Kumage District, Yamaguchi, Japan. It is operated by the West Japan Railway Company (JR West).

== Lines ==
Tabuse Station is served by the JR West Sanyō Main Line, and is located 385.4 kilometers from the terminus of the line at Kobe.

== Station layout ==
The station consists of two opposed side platforms connected by a footbridge. The station is unattended.

== Platforms ==
1	■ San'yō Line	for Tokuyama and Hōfu
3	■ San'yō Line	for Yanai and Iwakuni

== History ==
Tabuse Station was opened on 25 September 1897 as a station on the San'yo Railway with the opening of the extension from Hiroshima to Tokuyama. The San'yo Railway was nationalized in 1906 and the line renamed the San'yo Main Line in 1909. With the privatization of the Japan National Railway (JNR) on 1 April 1987, the station came under the aegis of the West Japan railway Company (JR West).

== Passenger statistics ==
In fiscal 2022, the station was used by an average of 987 passengers daily.

== Surrounding area ==
- Tabuse Town Office
- Mount Iwaki (石城山)
- Iwakisan Kōgoishi
- Shintō Tenkōkyo headquarters
- Tenshō Kōtai Jingūkyō headquarters
- Tomb of Eisaku Sato
- Yamaguchi Prefectural Kumage Minami High School (located in Hirao Town)
- Yamaguchi Prefectural Tabuse Agricultural and Technical High School

== See also ==
- List of railway stations in Japan
