= Iwata Station (Yamaguchi) =

Railway station in Hikari, Yamaguchi Prefecture, Japan

Iwata Station 岩田駅
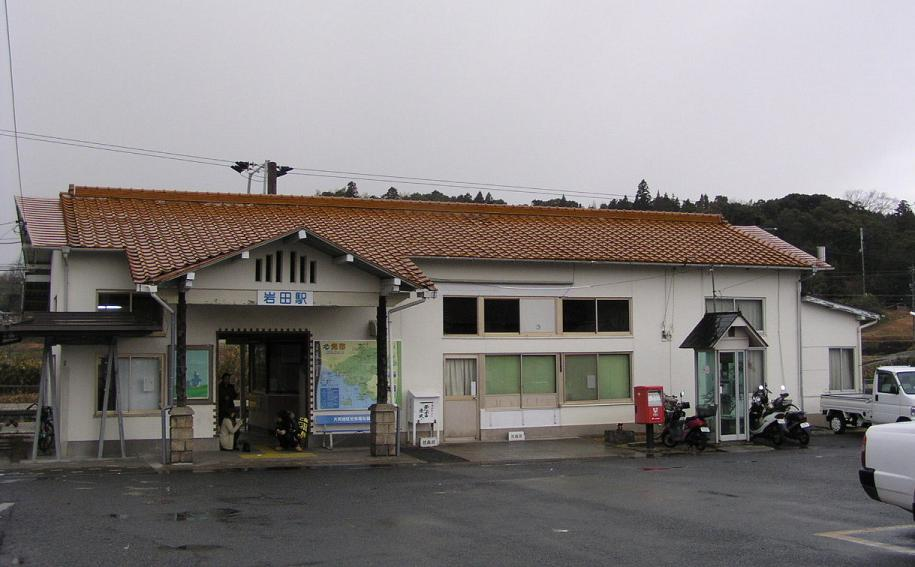
- Iwata Station in January 2008

General information
- Location: 2511-1 Iwata, Hikari-shi, Yamaguchi-kin 743-0103; Japan
- Coordinates: 33°58′53.85″N 131°59′43.03″E
- Owner: West Japan Railway Company
- Operator: West Japan Railway Company
- Line: San'yō Line
- Distance: 390.9 km (242.9 miles) from Kobe
- Platforms: 1 side + 1 island platform
- Tracks: 2
- Connections: Bus stop

Construction
- Accessible: Yes

Other information
- Status: Unstaffed
- Website: Official website

History
- Opened: 5 June 1899; 127 years ago

Passengers
- FY2022: 325

Services
Preceding station	JR West	Following station
Shimata towards Shimonoseki	San'yō Line Local	Tabuse towards Iwakuni
Location
- Location within Yamaguchi Prefecture Location within Japan

Iwata Station (岩田駅, Iwata-eki) is a passenger railway station located in the city of Hikari, Yamaguchi Prefecture, Japan. It is operated by the West Japan Railway Company (JR West).

== Lines ==
Iwata Station is served by the JR West Sanyō Main Line, and is located 390.9 kilometers from the terminus of the line at Kobe.

== Station layout ==
The station consists of a side platform and an island platform; however, one half of the island platform (the middle track) is no longer in use. The station building is adjacent to the side platform connected by a footbridge to the island platform. The station is unattended.

== Platforms ==
1	■ San'yō Line	for Yanai and Iwakuni
3	■ San'yō Line	for Tokuyama and Hōfu

== History ==
Iwata Station was opened on 5 June 1899 as an infill station on the San'yo Railway. The San'yo Railway was nationalized in 1906 and the line renamed the San'yo Main Line in 1909. The current station building was completed in March 1937. With the privatization of the Japan National Railway (JNR) on 1 April 1987, the station came under the aegis of the West Japan railway Company (JR West).

== Passenger statistics ==
In fiscal 2022, the station was used by an average of 325 passengers daily.

== Surrounding area ==
- Hikari City Hall Yamato Branch (former Yamato Town Hall)
- Hikari City Iwata Elementary School
- Hikari City Miwa Elementary School
- Hikari City Yamato Junior High School
- Hikari City Yamato General Hospital
- Mount Iwaki (石城山)
- Shintō Tenkōkyo headquarters
- Iwakisan Kōgoishi

== See also ==
- List of railway stations in Japan
