= Sayo =

Sayo may refer to:

- Sayo (given name), a feminine Japanese given name
- Sayō, Hyōgo, a town in Sayō District, Hyōgo Prefecture, Japan
- Sayō District, Hyōgo, a district in Hyōgo Prefecture, Japan
- Sayo Station, a railway station in Hyōgo Prefecture, Japan
- Sayo (woreda), a woreda in the Oromia Region of Ethiopia

== See also ==
- Siege of Saïo, a battle of the East African Campaign of World War II
