= Sayo (given name) =

- Gender: Female

Origin
- Origin: Japanese
- Meaning: Different meanings depending on the kanji used

Sayo (written: 沙世, 沙代 or 紗世) is a feminine Japanese given name. Notable people with the name include:

- Sayo Aizawa (相沢 紗世; born 1978), Japanese model and television personality
- Sayo Hayakawa (早川 沙世; born 1983), Japanese fashion model
- Sayo Nomura (野村 沙世; born 1989), Japanese long-distance runner
- Sayo Shiota (塩田 沙代; born 1989), Japanese handball player
- Sayo Yamamoto (山本 沙代; born 1977), Japanese anime director
- Kitamura Sayo (北村 サヨ; 1900 – 1967), founder of the Tenshō Kōtai Jingūkyō

== Fictional characters ==
- Sayo Aisaka (相坂 さよ), a character in the manga series Negima!
- Sayo Arima (有馬 小夜), a character in the manga series Double-J
- Sayo Hitsugi (柩 小夜), a character in the manga series Triage X
- Sayo Hikawa (氷川 紗夜), a character in the media franchise BanG Dream!
- Sayo Ishihara (石原 砂代), a character in the manga series A.I. Love You
- Sayo Kaburagi (鏑木 小夜), a character in the OVA series One Off
- Sayo Kotobuki (寿 沙夜), a character in the manga series Gals!
- Sayo Oharu (大治 小夜), a character in the tokusatsu series Mashin Sentai Kiramager
- Sayo Shizumori (静森 早夜), a character in the manga series My Girlfriend is Shobitch
- Sayo Takahashi (高橋 沙夜), a character in the manga series Recorder and Randsell
- Sayo Yarai (矢来 小夜), a character in the manga series Sora no Manimani
- Sayo Yasuda (安田 紗代), a character in the visual novel Umineko When They Cry
- Sayo Yuuki (結城 小夜), a character in the video game Shikigami no Shiro
- Sayo Samonji (左文字 小夜), a character in the online game and anime series "Touken Ranbu"
