= Iwakiyama Prefectural Natural Park =

Natural park of Yamaguchi prefecture, Japan

Coordinates: 33°59′15″N 132°2′21″E

- 石城山県立自然公園
- Interactive map of Iwakiyama Prefectural Natural Park
- Location: Yamaguchi Prefecture, Japan
- Area: 27.16 km^{2} (10.49 sq mi)
- Established: 1 March 1962

Iwakiyama Prefectural Natural Park (石城山県立自然公園, Iwakiyama kenritsu shizen kōen) is a Prefectural Natural Park in southeast Yamaguchi Prefecture, Japan. Established in 1962, the park spans the borders of the municipalities of Hikari, Shūnan, and Tabuse. The park comprises Mount Iwaki.

== See also ==
- National Parks of Japan
- Mount Iwaki (Yamaguchi)
