= Iwakisan Kōgoishi =

Castle ruins in Hikari, Yamaguchi, Japan

- 石城山神籠石
- Hikari, Yamaguchi, Yamaguchi Prefecture, Japan
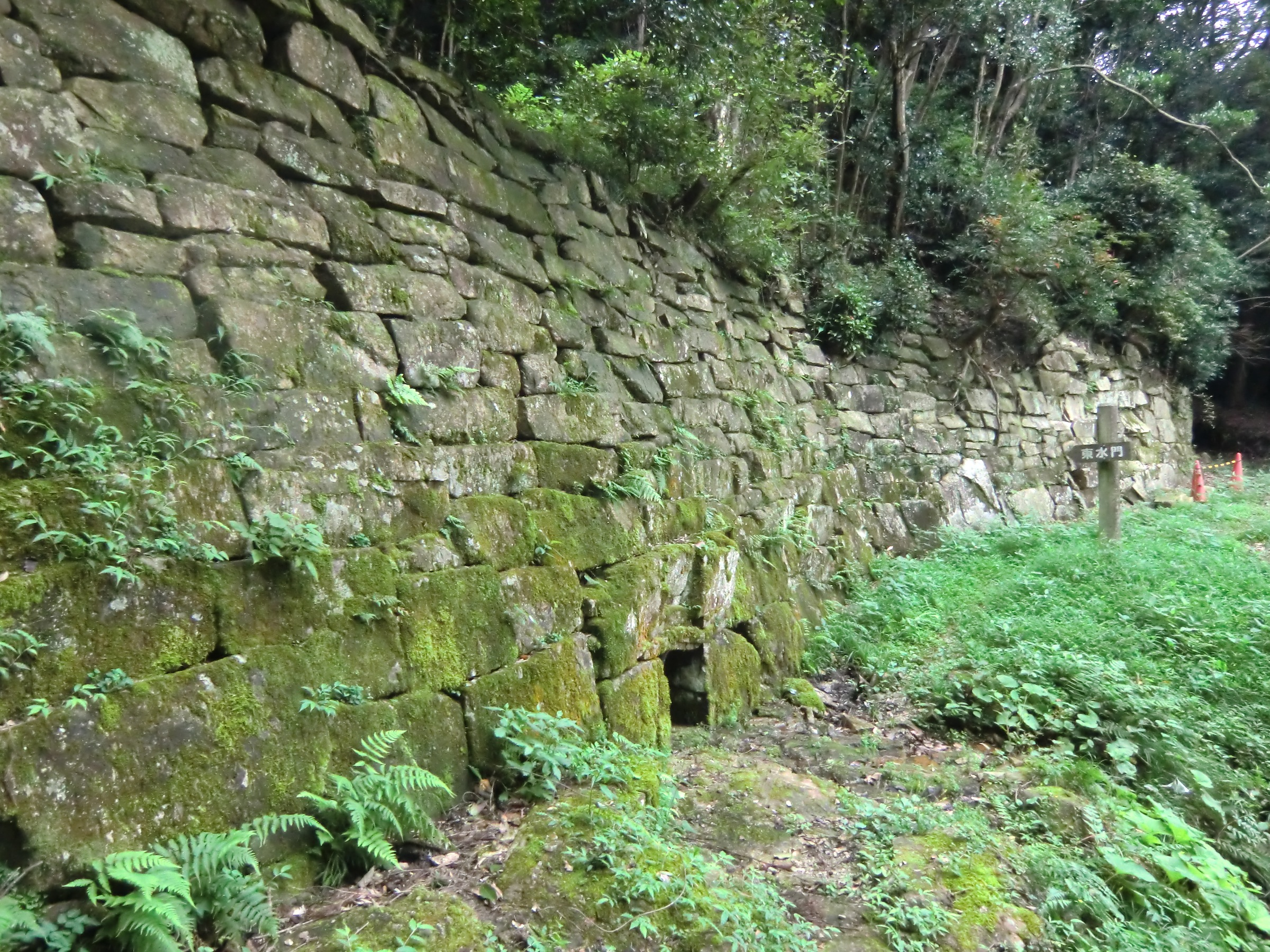
- Iwakisan Kōgoishi East Watergate

Site information
- Type: Korean-style fortress
- Condition: Ruins

Location
- Coordinates: 33°59′14.8″N 132°02′26.5″E

Site history
- Built: Asuka Period
- Built by: Yamato court
- In use: Asuka - Nara period
- National Historic Site of Japan

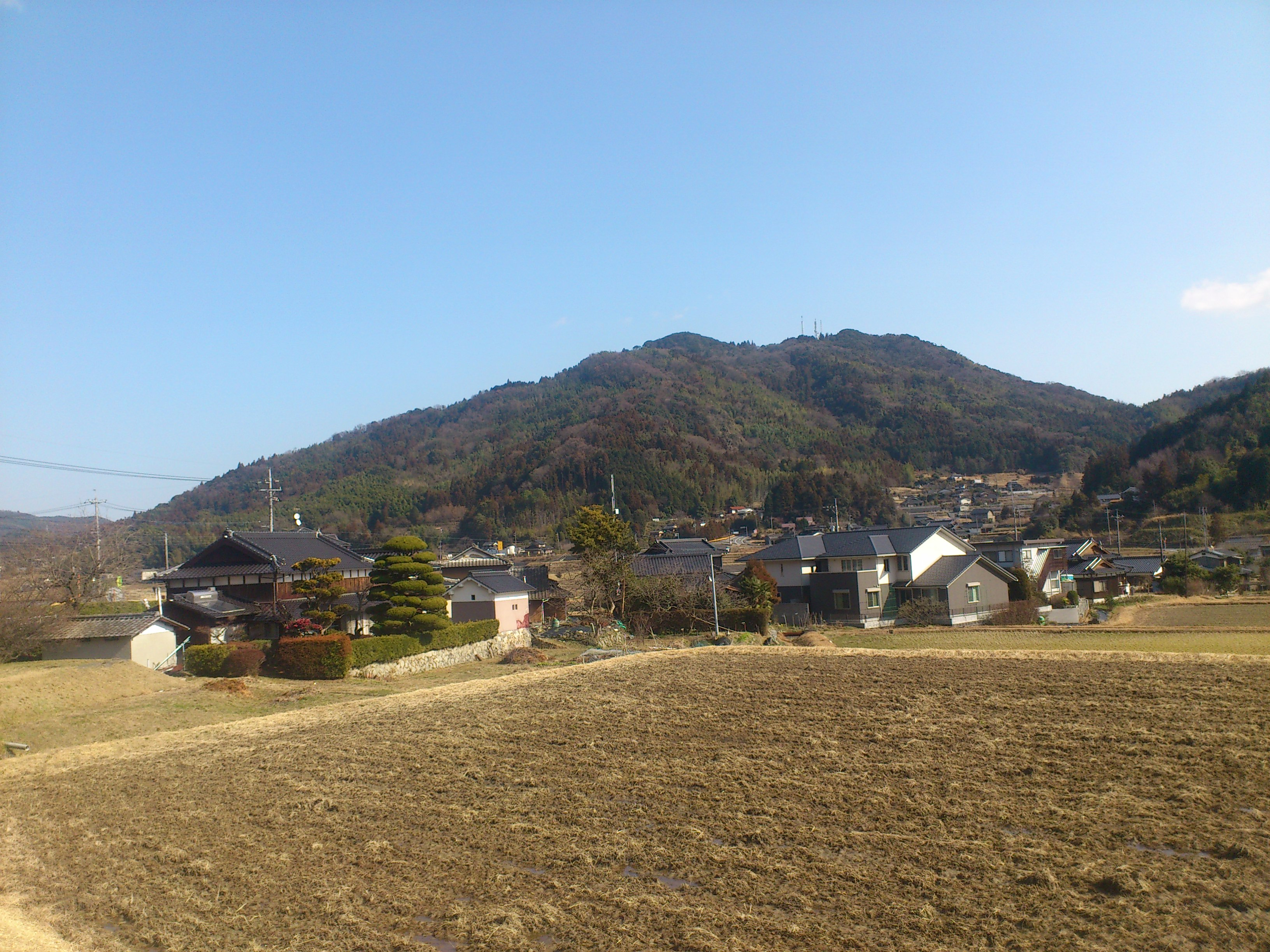
Panoramic view

Iwakisan Kōgoishi (石城山神籠石) was an ancient castle (also known as a Korean-style fortress (朝鮮式山城, Chōsen-shiki yamajiro) located on Mount Iwaki (石城山, Iwaki-san) in the city of Hikari, Yamaguchi Prefecture, in the San'yō region of Japan. Its ruins have been protected as a National Historic Site since 1951.

Shrines affiliated with Shintō Tenkōkyo, a Japanese new religion, are located immediately to the south of Iwakisan Kōgoishi.

== History ==
After the defeat of the combined Baekje and Yamato Japan forces, at the hands of the Silla and Tang China alliance at the Battle of Hakusukinoe in 663, the Yamato court feared an invasion from either or both Tang or Silla. In response, they built a huge network of shore fortifications throughout the rest of the 600s, often with the assistance of Baekje engineers, generals and artisans. Unaware of the outbreak of the Silla–Tang War (670–676), the Japanese would continue to build fortifications until 701, after finding out that Silla was no longer friendly with Tang. The Iwakisan kōgoshi is one such fortification.

The Iwakisan Kōgoshi is located on Mount Iwaki (elevation 362 meters) on the Murozu Peninsula which projects into the western Seto Inland Sea. It was strategically located not only to control the western entrance to the Seto Inland Sea, but overlooked an anchorage which could be used to intercept ships passing from the Kanmon Strait.

It is not mentioned in historical documents such as Nihon Shoki, and the year of construction is unknown. The fortifications form a band which completely encompasses the top of the mountain, with a total length of 2.6 kilometers. There are four valleys in the north, south, east, and west, in which stone walls and water gates were installed. There were two castle gates, to the east and the north. The walls were constructed of locally quarried stone block, measuring 70 cm by 50 to 100 centimeters and 40 to 60 centimeters thick. Although now exposed, it is known that they were buried in the earthworks in the past and served to provide earth retention and reinforcement of earthen ramparts. These ramparts were about eight meters high, with walls at an angle of 60 to 90 degrees. There is a rammed-earth mound in the center of the fortification, which was created by shaving the slopes from a natural hill, solidifying the foundation and piling up the front and back with rammed earth.

The fortification ruins were introduced to academia in 1909. Prior to this, the site was thought to be a "kōgoishi", a name coined by the Meiji period archaeologist Tsuboi Shōgorō, who conjectured that such sites were spiritual or sacred sites. Scholars after Tsuboi determined that the structures are most likely the remains of practical, military fortifications, and were unlikely to have significant spiritual connections. The style and form of the ruins matches many in Korea; In the Bakumatsu period, the mountain was used a headquarters and training grounds for Chōshū Domain's Kiheitai militia.

The site was excavated 1963 to 1964 by the Cultural Properties Protection Committee (now the Agency for Cultural Affairs), the Yamaguchi Prefectural Board of Education, and the Yamato Village Board of Education (now Hikari City). Part of the stone wall collapsed due to torrential rain in 2004, but conservation repairs were carried out in 2006, with granite was used for the base in order to distinguish it from the existing remains.

== Access ==
The site can be reached in about 60 minutes by foot from Iwata Station on the JR West Sanyo Main Line. It can also be reached by car or foot from Tabuse Station.

== Gallery ==
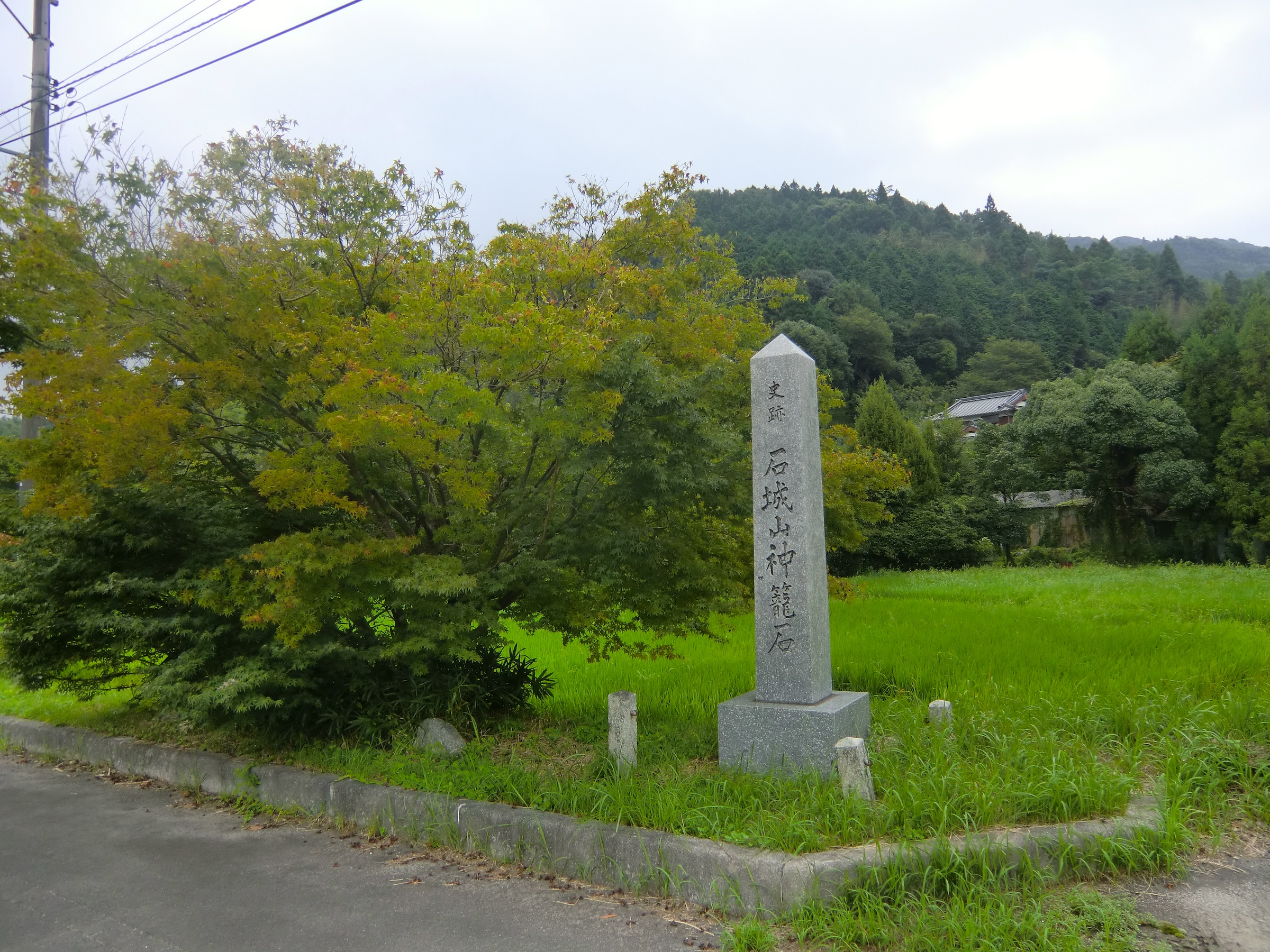
Monument on Yamaguchi Prefectural Route 160

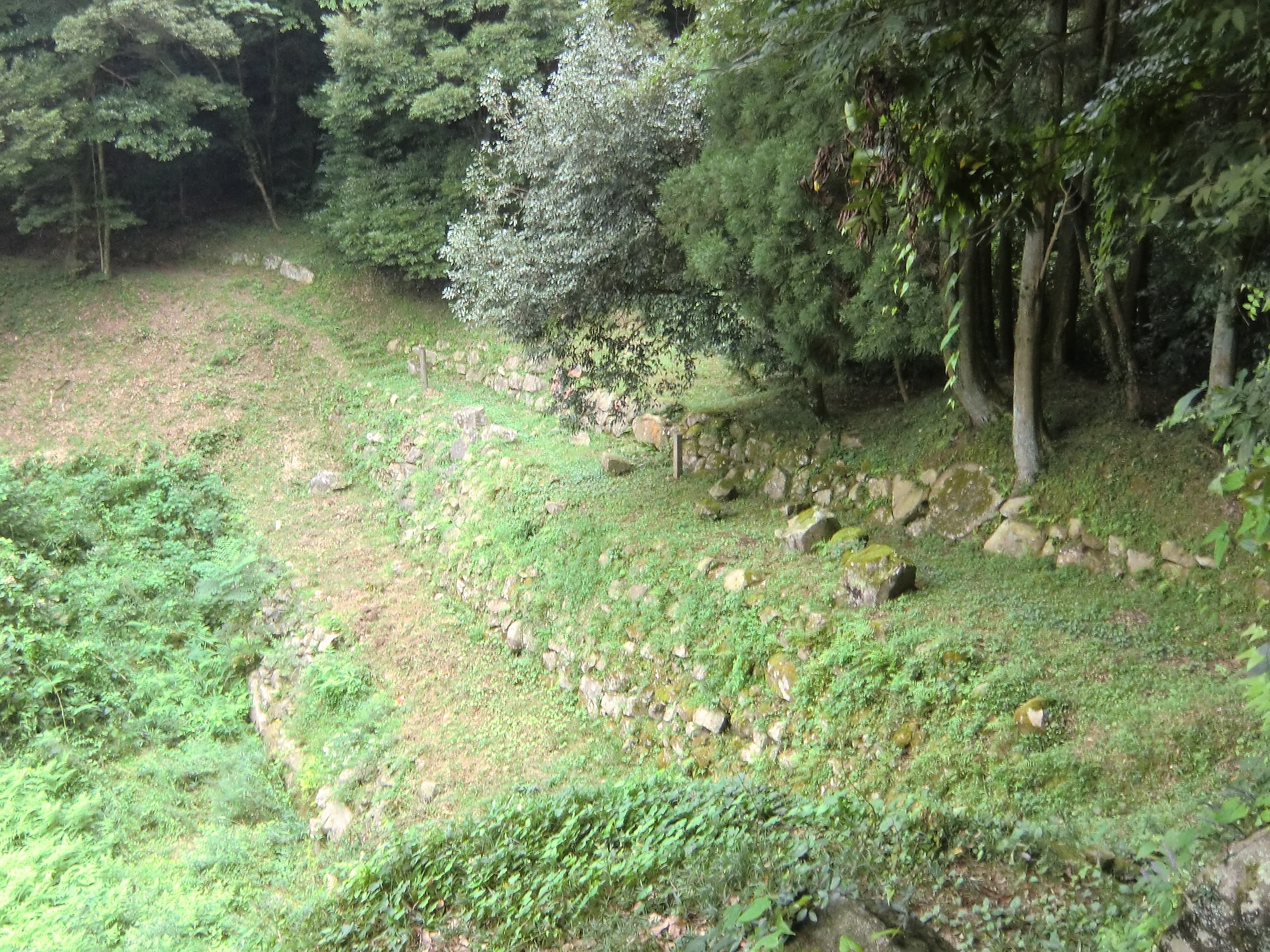
Western Watergate ruins

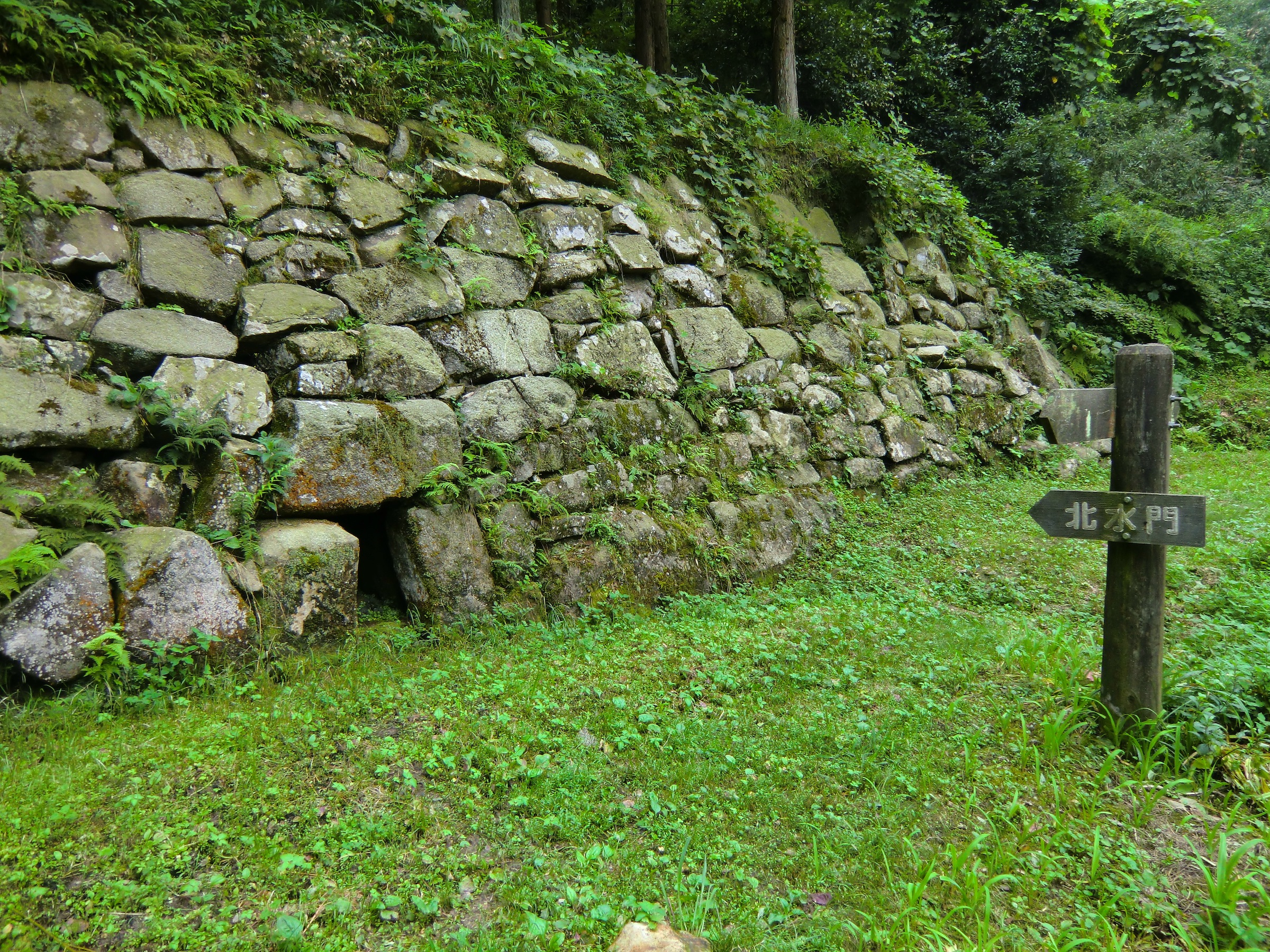
Northern Watergate ruins

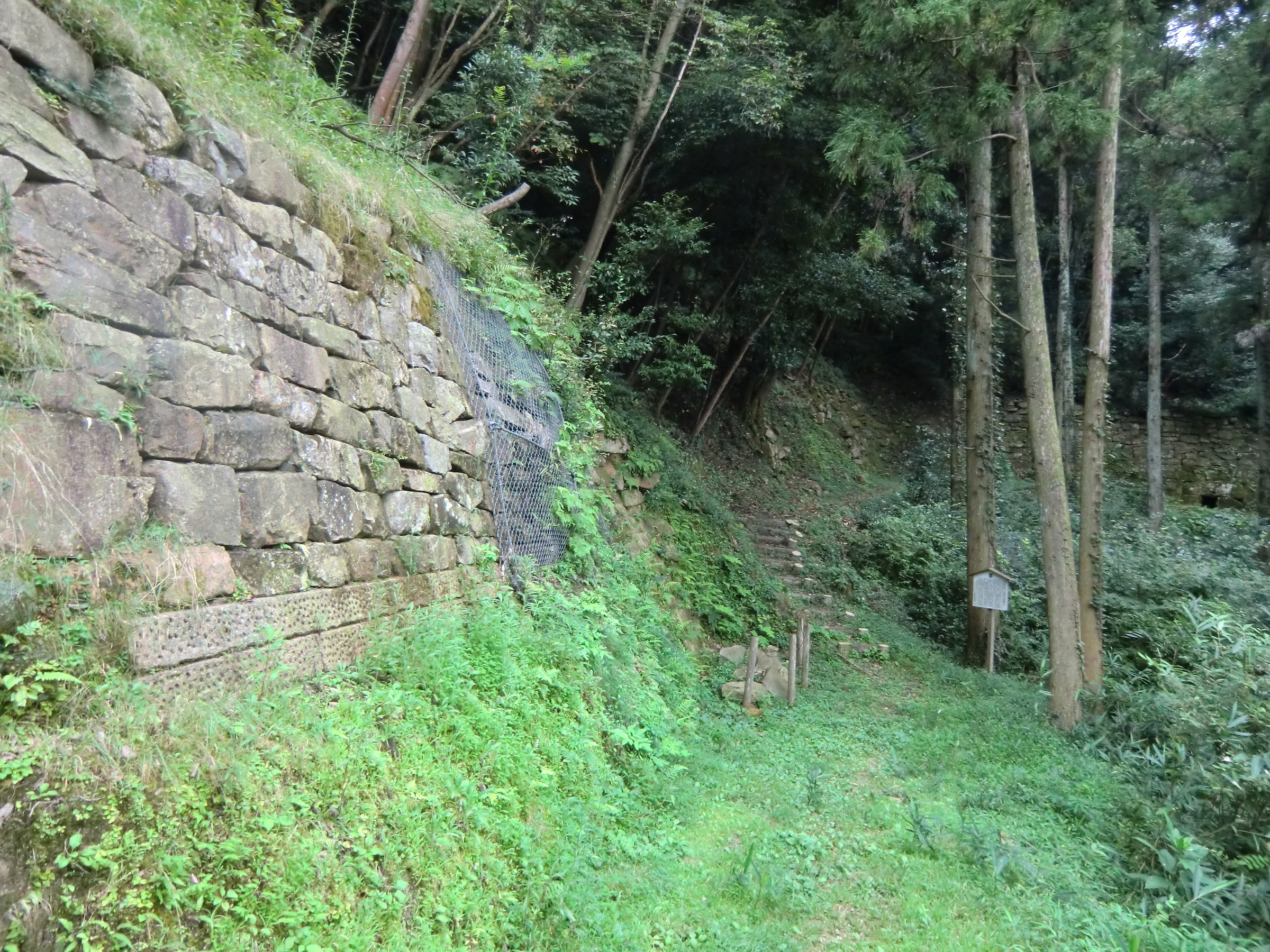
Eastern Watergate ruins and walls

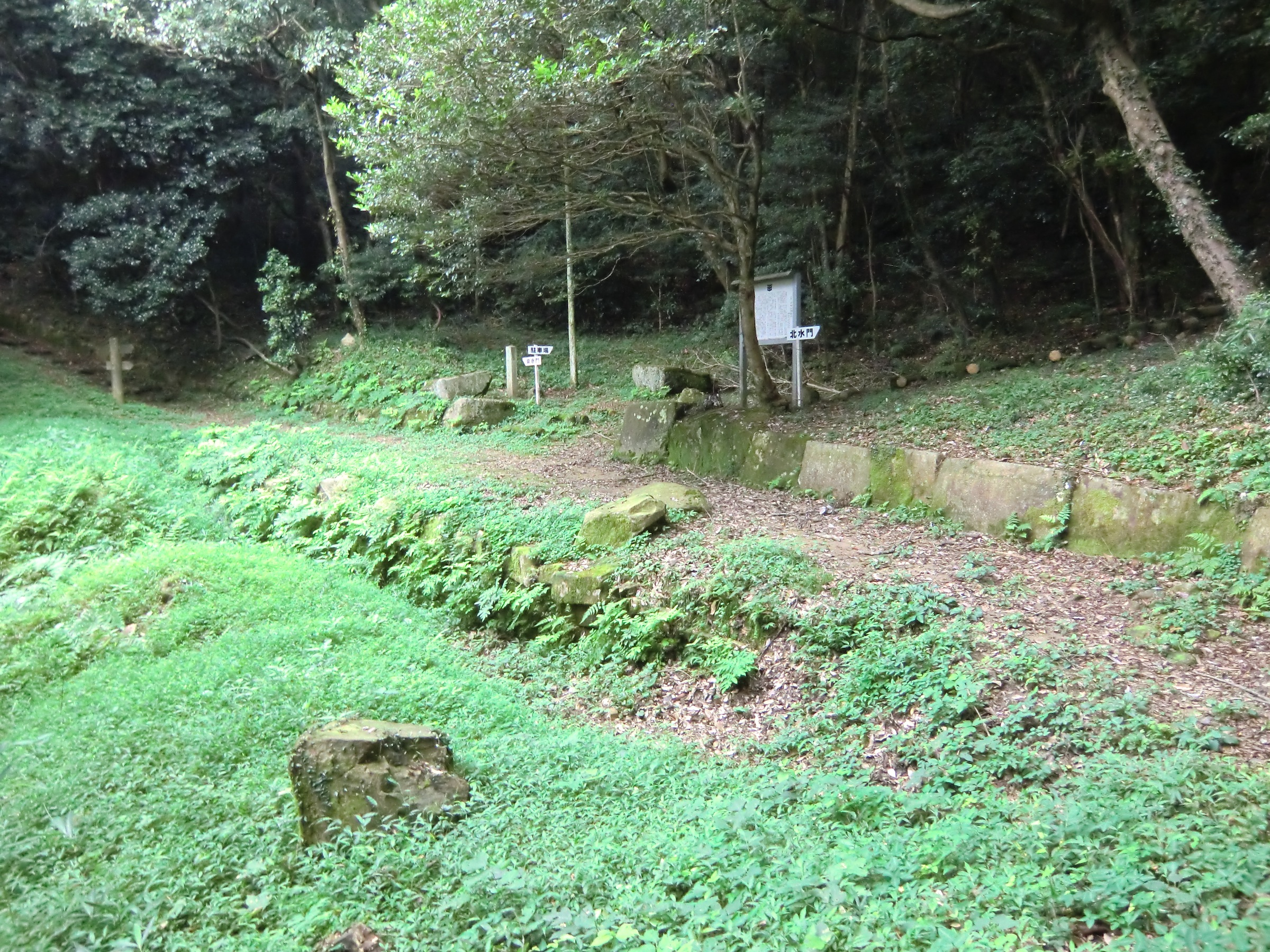
Ruins of North Gate

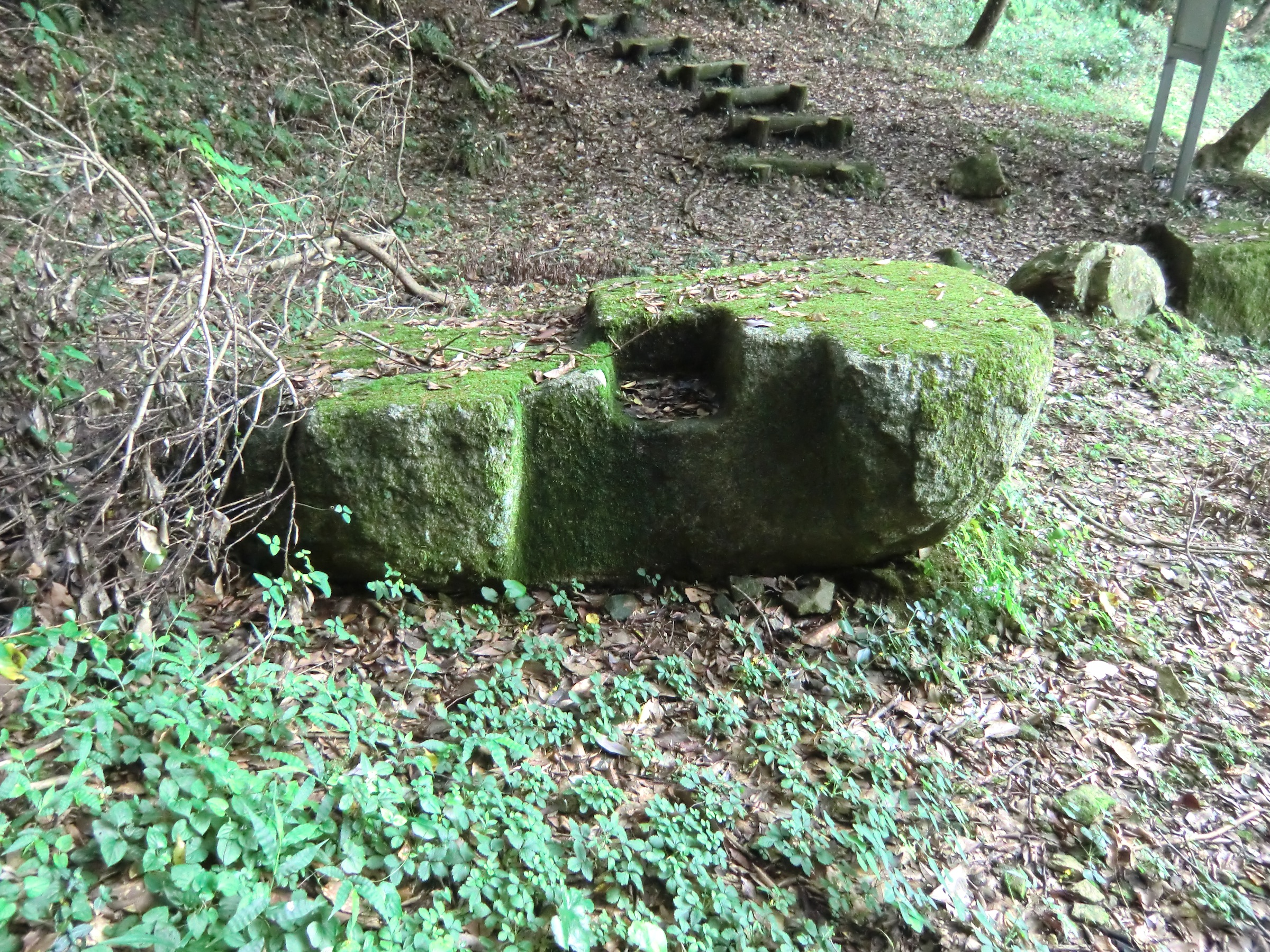
Ruins of North Gate

== See also ==
- List of Historic Sites of Japan (Yamaguchi)
- List of foreign-style castles in Japan
- Kōgoishi

== Literature ==
- De Lange, William (2021). An Encyclopedia of Japanese Castles. Groningen: Toyo Press. pp. 600 pages. ISBN 978-9492722300.
- Motoo, Hinago (1986). Japanese Castles. Tokyo: Kodansha. pp. 200 pages. ISBN 0-87011-766-1.
