= Mount Iwaki (Yamaguchi) =

Sacred mountain in Yamaguchi Prefecture, Japan

- 石城山; Iwaki-san; Iwaki-yama
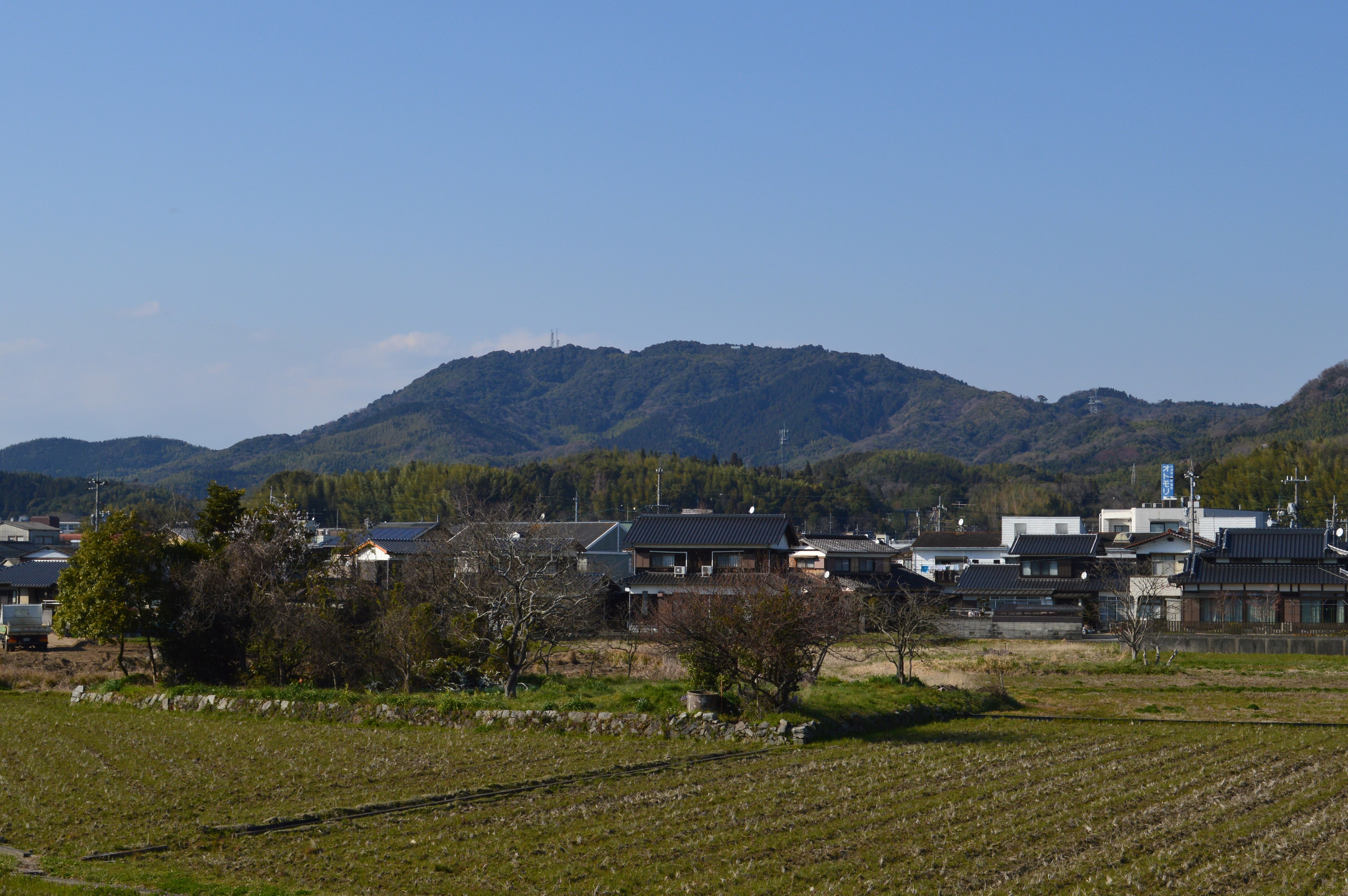
- Mount Iwaki as seen from the surrounding plains

Highest point
- Elevation: 362 m (1,188 ft)
- Coordinates: 33°59′15″N 132°02′21″E

Geography
- Location: Hikari and Tabuse in Yamaguchi Prefecture, Japan

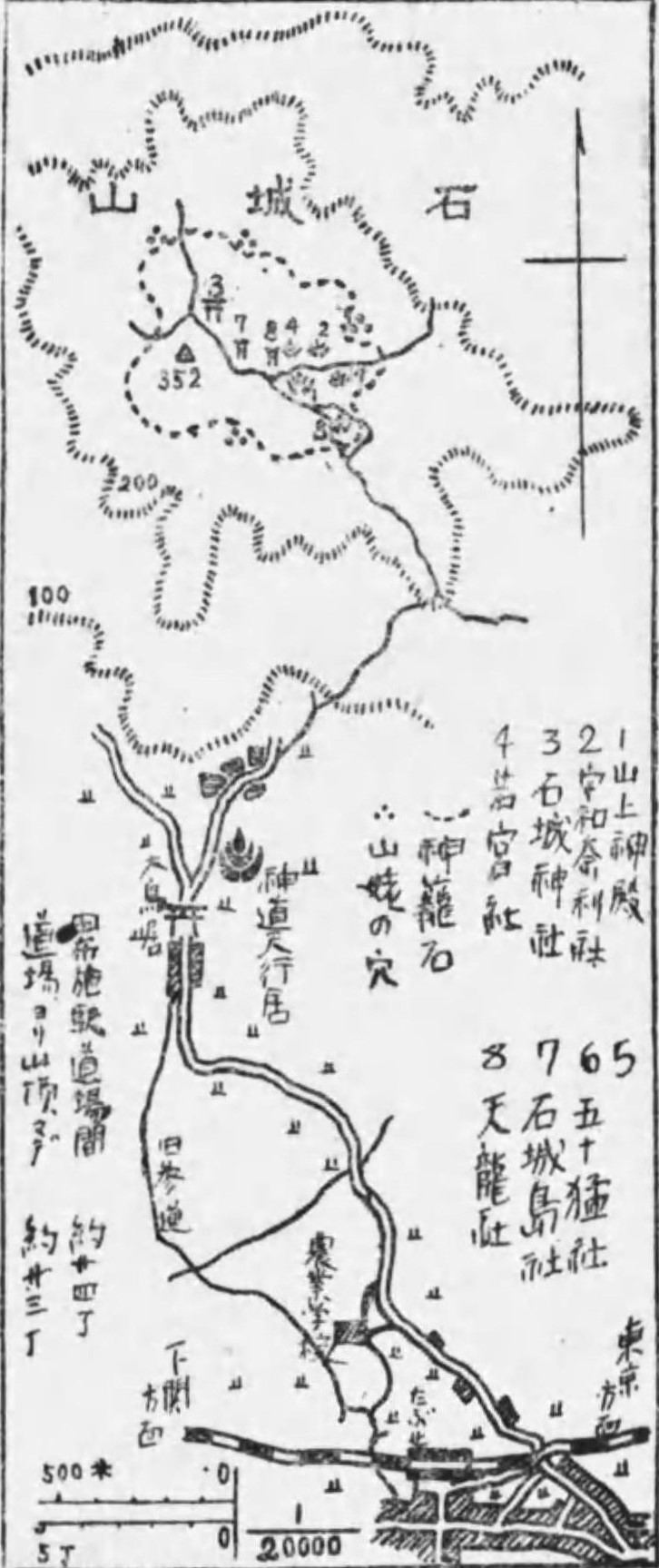
1940 map of shrines on Mount Iwaki

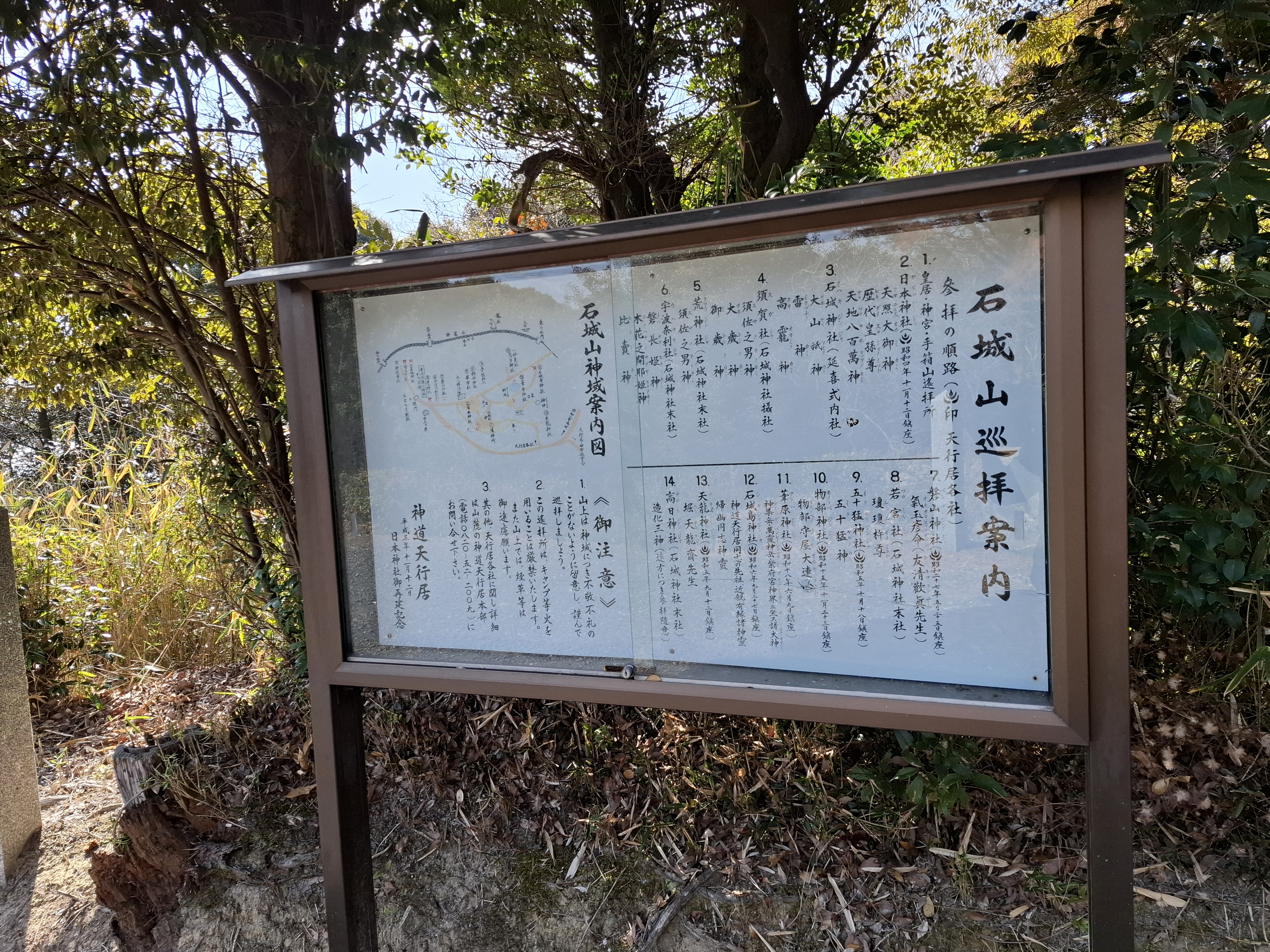
Informational signboard at the entrance of Yamato Jinja providing descriptions of the shrines on Mount Iwaki

Mount Iwaki (Japanese: 石城山, Hepburn: Iwaki-san), also known as Iwaki-yama (石城山) in the Shintō Tenkōkyo religion, is a sacred mountain in Yamaguchi Prefecture, Japan. Administratively, Mount Iwaki's summit and northern slopes are situated within the city of Hikari in Yamaguchi Prefecture, while its southern slopes are situated within the city of Tabuse. The mountain is located to the north of the town center of Tabuse.

The mountain is located within Iwakiyama Prefectural Natural Park.

== Sites ==
Iwakisan Kōgoishi (石城山神籠石), a 7th-century military stone fortification, is located on the summit of Mount Iwaki.

Just to the south of Iwakisan Kōgoishi, Shintō Tenkōkyo's shrines are located on Mount Iwaki (石城山), The religion pronounces the name of the mountain as Iwaki-yama, but outside the religion the conventional pronunciation is Iwaki-san. It is the most sacred mountain of Shintō Tenkōkyo and is considered to be the earthly representation of the heavenly gathering place of the gods, similar to Oomoto's treatment of Mount Hongū in Ayabe. Every November on Mount Iwaki, Shintō Tenkōkyo organizes a nighttime ritual ceremony (山上夜間特別修法) for "universal harmony and world spiritualization" (万有和合・世界霊化). Followers recite the "Ten Prayers" (十言神咒) in dedication to Amaterasu.

Immediately to the west of Shintō Tenkōkyo's shrines, Iwaki Jinja (石城神社) and its affiliated auxiliary shrines (setsumatsusha 摂末社) predate the Shinto Tenkokyo shrines.

=== Shrines ===
Shinto shrines on Mount Iwaki are as follows.

- Yamato Jinja (日本神社) is the main shrine affiliated with Shintō Tenkōkyo. It is a large shrine building dedicated to the nation of Japan and the imperial family. Founding date: November 12, 1929. Enshrined deities: Amaterasu Ōkami 天照大御神, Shikidai Sumemima no Mikoto 歴代皇孫尊, Ametsuchi Yao Yorozu no Kami 天地八百萬神.
- Iwaki Jinja (石城神社) predates the Shinto Tenkokyo shrines and was founded at least 1,000 years ago. Its enshrined deities are Ōyamatsumi no Mikoto 大山祇命, Ikazuchi no Kami 雷神, and Takaokami no Kami 高龗神.
- Suga-sha (須賀社) is a massha affiliated with Iwaki Jinja and is adjacent to Iwaki Jinja. Enshrined deities: Susanoo no Kami 須佐之男神, Ōtoshi no Kami 大歳神, Mitoshi no Kami 御歳神.

The following three massha shrines form a cluster located around a peak called Ōmine (大峰; elevation: 356.2 metres), to the northwest of Yamato Jinja.

- Kuwau Jinja (荒神社) is a massha affiliated with Iwaki Jinja. Enshrined deity: Susanoo no Kami 須佐之男神.
- Uwanari-sha (宇和奈利社) is a massha affiliated with Iwaki Jinja. Enshrined deities: Konohanasakuya-hime no Kami 木花開耶姫神 (or Konohanasakuya-hime no Mikoto 木花開耶姫命), as well as Iwanagahime no Kami 磐長姫神 and Hime no Kami 比賣神.
- Banzan Jinja (磐山神社) is a Shintō Tenkōkyo auxiliary shrine where the spirit of Tomokiyo Yoshisane is enshrined. Founding date: May 25, 1952. Enshrined deity: Okitamahiko no Mikoto 氣玉顏命 (the deified spirit of Tomokiyo Yoshisane).

The following three massha shrines form a cluster located directly to the north of Yamato Jinja, and east of the shrine cluster listed above.

- Wakamiya-sha (若宮社) is a massha affiliated with Iwaki Jinja. Enshrined deity: Ninigi no Mikoto 瓊瓊杵尊.
- Itakeru Jinja (五十猛神社) is a Shintō Tenkōkyo auxiliary shrine. Founding date: October 18, 1930. Enshrined deity: Itakeru no Kami 五十猛神 (or Itakeru no Ōkami 五十猛大神).
- Mononobe Jinja (物部神社) is a Shintō Tenkōkyo auxiliary shrine. Founding date: November 23, 1940. Enshrined deity: Mononobe no Moriya Ōmuraji no Mikoto 物部守屋大連命.

The following shrines are located east of Yamato Jinja.

- Ashihara Jinja (葦原神社) is a Shintō Tenkōkyo auxiliary shrine. It is characterized by a koi pond called Kami no Ike (神池) （"Gods' Pond") and is located along the path to Shikishima Jinja. It is located just west of Shikishima Jinja. Founding date: June 9, 1943. Enshrined deities and associated mythological places: "All the Great Gods residing in" (...に坐す諸大神, ...ni masu moromoro no ōmikami) – Shinshū-gaku 神集岳 ("Peak of the Gods' Assembly"), Banreishin-gaku 萬靈神岳 ("Ten Thousand Spirits and Gods Peak"), and Shifukyū shinkai 紫府宮神界 ("Divine Realm of the Purple Palace"). These terms are from Ikyō Bibōroku (異境備忘録), a book written in the 19th century by Shinto esotericist Miyaji Suii (宮地水位, 1852–1904). In Miyaji's hidden spirit worlds, Shinjyugaku-Shinkai (神集岳神界) contains the capitals of the spirit world, while Banreigakue-Shinkai (万霊岳神界) is where deities in the spirit world decide what would happen in the other worlds. Ashihara Jinja ni tsuite (葦原神社について) (1993) also lists additional enshrined deities, which are Izanagi 伊弉那岐, Kotoshironushi 事代主, Suseribime-no-Mikoto 須勢理姫命, Ryūhi-no-Mikoto 龍飛命, Ōkamuzumi-no-Mikoto 意富加牟豆美命, and Mizuhanome-no-Mikoto 罔象女命.
- Shikishima Jinja (石城島神社) is large shrine building for memorializing the spirits of deceased Shintō Tenkōkyo followers. Founding date: September 27, 1931.
- Tenryū Jinja (天龍神社) is a Shintō Tenkōkyo auxiliary shrine where the spirit of Hori Tenryūsai 堀天龍斎 (1856–1930), a hermit who was one of Tomokiyo Yoshisane's teachers, is enshrined. Founding date: September 12, 1930. Enshrined deity: Hori Tenryūsai Akimichi Ushi no Mikoto 堀天龍斎明道大人命 (the deified spirit of Hori Tenryūsai).
- Takahi Jinja (高日神社), also called Myōken-sha (妙見社), is a massha affiliated with Iwaki Jinja. It is the northeasternmost shrine on Mount Iwaki. It is located at the top of a summit called Takahi-ga-mine (高日ヶ峰; elevation: 362 metres). Enshrined deities (Zōka Sanshin 造化三神, etc.): Ame-no-Minakanushi 天之御中主神 (first created deity, associated with the center of the universe), Sun deity 日神, Moon deity 月神, Star deity 星神, Takahi Peak deity 高日峰之神.

Iwakisan Kōgoishi (石城山神籠石), the ruins of an ancient castle, is located to the northeast of the Shintō Tenkōkyo shrine cluster.

The shrines listed above are summarized in the table below.

Mount Iwaki shrines
Image	Shrine name (romaji)	Shrine name (Japanese)	Founding date	Enshrined deities	Affiliation	Coordinates
	Yamato Jinja	日本神社	November 12, 1929	Amaterasu Ōkami 天照大御神, Shikidai Sumemima no Mikoto 歴代皇孫尊, Ametsuchi Yao Yorozu no Kami 天地八百萬神	Shintō Tenkōkyo (main shrine)	33°59′09.7″N 132°02′17.8″E
	Iwaki Jinja	石城神社		Ōyamatsumi no Mikoto 大山祇命, Ikazuchi no Kami 雷神, Takaokami no Kami 高龗神	Iwaki Jinja	33°59′14.8″N 132°02′8.4″E
	Suga-sha	須賀社		Susanoo no Kami 須佐之男神, Ōtoshi no Kami 大歳神, Mitoshi no Kami 御歳神	Iwaki Jinja (massha)	33°59′14.4″N 132°02′07″E
	Kuwau Jinja	荒神社		Susanoo no Kami 須佐之男神	Iwaki Jinja (massha)	33°59′09.9″N 132°02′12.1″E
	Uwanari-sha	宇和奈利社		Konohanasakuya-hime no Kami 木花開耶姫神, Iwanagahime no Kami 磐長姫神, Hime no Kami 比賣神	Iwaki Jinja (massha)	33°59′09.8″N 132°02′14.3″E
	Banzan Jinja	磐山神社	May 25, 1952	Okitamahiko no Mikoto 氣玉顏命 (deified spirit of Tomokiyo Yoshisane 友清歓真)	Shintō Tenkōkyo (massha)	33°59′10.2″N 132°02′15.0″E
	Wakamiya-sha	若宮社		Ninigi no Mikoto 瓊瓊杵尊	Iwaki Jinja (massha)	33°59′11.0″N 132°02′17.7″E
	Itakeru Jinja	五十猛神社	October 18, 1930	Itakeru no Kami 五十猛神	Shintō Tenkōkyo (massha)	33°59′12.0″N 132°02′18.3″E
	Mononobe Jinja	物部神社	November 23, 1940	Mononobe no Moriya Ōmuraji no Mikoto 物部守屋大連命	Shintō Tenkōkyo (massha)	33°59′11.5″N 132°02′17.8″E
	Ashihara Jinja	葦原神社	June 9, 1943	The gods of Shinshū-gaku 神集岳, Banreishin-gaku 萬靈神岳, Shifukyū shinkai 紫府宮神界	Shintō Tenkōkyo (massha)	33°59′11.8″N 132°02′22.2″E
	Shikishima Jinja	石城島神社	September 27, 1931	Spirits of deceased Shintō Tenkōkyo followers	Shintō Tenkōkyo (shrine for ancestral spirits)	33°59′10.6″N 132°02′24.3″E
	Tenryū Jinja	天龍神社	September 12, 1930	Hori Tenryūsai Akimichi Ushi no Mikoto 堀天龍斎明道大人命 (deified spirit of Hori Tenryūsai 堀天龍斎)	Shintō Tenkōkyo (massha)	33°59′06.1″N 132°02′23.4″E
	Takahi Jinja (Myōken-sha)	高日神社 (妙見社)		Ame-no-Minakanushi 天之御中主神 (Universe deity), Sun deity 日神, Moon deity 月神, Star deity 星神, Takahi Peak deity 高日峰之神	Iwaki Jinja (massha)	33°59′15.4″N 132°02′20.9″E

The headquarters of Shintō Tenkōkyo is located at the southern base of Mount Iwaki. The shinden (神殿) of the headquarters, known as the Shintō Tenkōkyo honbu shinden (神道天行居本部神殿), was founded on May 27, 1928.

== Bird species ==
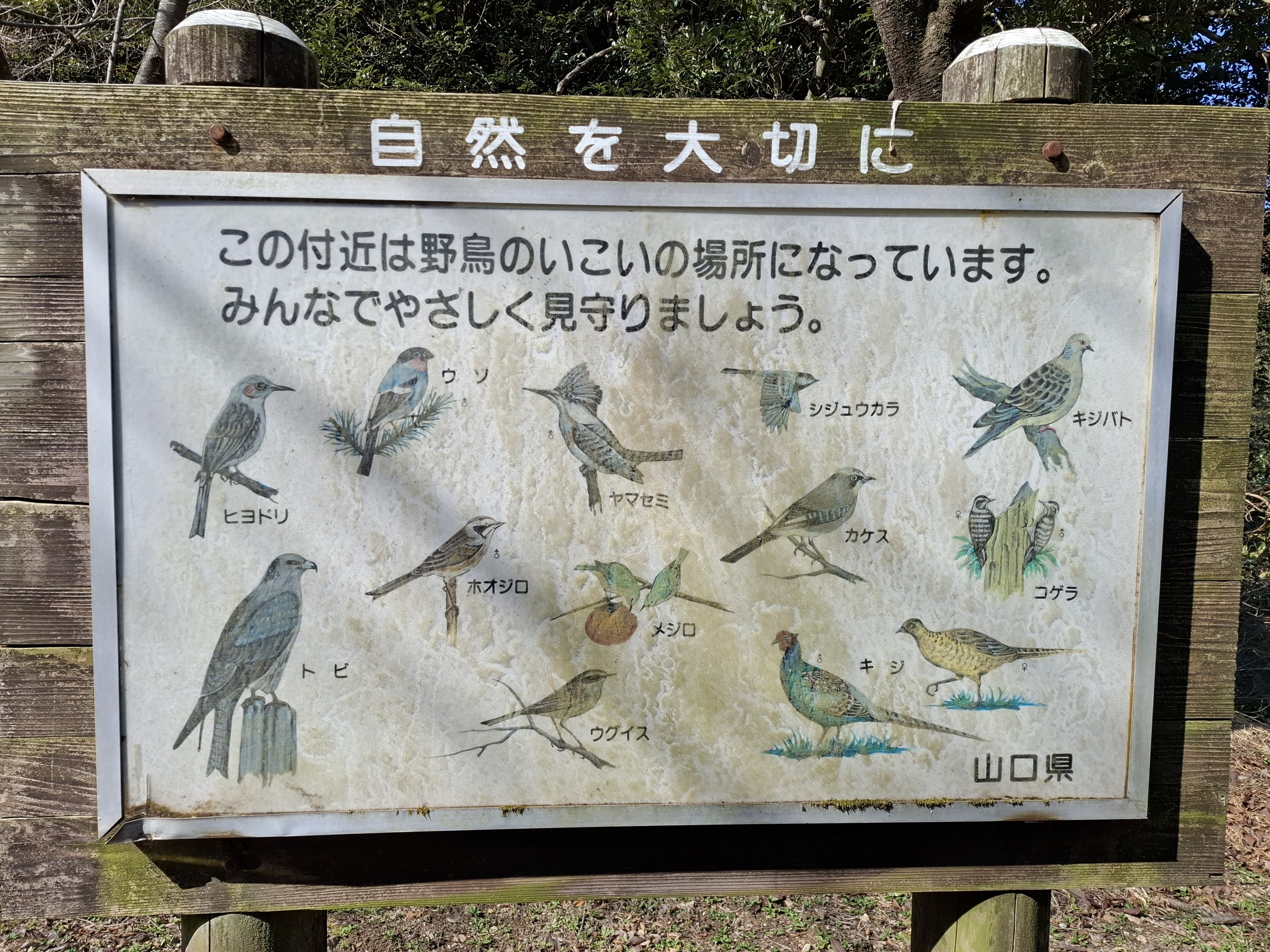
Sign on Mount Iwaki with illustrations of various bird species that can be found on the mountain

Bird species that can be found on Mount Iwaki include:

- Brown-eared bulbul (ヒヨドリ, hiyodori): Hypsipetes amaurotis
- Eurasian bullfinch (ウソ, uso): Pyrrhula pyrrhula
- Crested kingfisher (ヤマセミ, yamasemi): Megaceryle lugubris
- Cinereous tit (シジュウカラ, shijūkara): Parus minor
- Oriental turtle dove (キジバト, kijibato): Streptopelia orientalis
- Black kite (トビ, tobi): Milvus migrans
- Meadow bunting (ホオジロ, hōjiro): Emberiza cioides
- Eurasian jay (カケス, kakesu): Garrulus glandarius
- Japanese pygmy woodpecker (コゲラ, kogera): Yungipicus kizuki
- Warbling white-eye (メジロ, mejiro): Zosterops japonicus
- Japanese bush warbler (ウグイス, uguisu): Horornis diphone
- Green pheasant (キジ, kiji): Phasianus versicolor
