= Reticulate acropigmentation of Kitamura =

- Other names: RAK
- Specialty: Dermatology
- Symptoms: Coloured freckle-like and slightly depressed flat spots arranged in a lace-like pattern
- Usual onset: Teenagers and early adulthood
- Differential diagnosis: Dowling–Degos disease
- Frequency: Rare

Reticulate acropigmentation of Kitamura is a type of pigmentation disorder of the skin. It presents with coloured freckle-like and slightly depressed flat spots arranged in a lace-like pattern on the backs of hands and feet. It tends to occur in skin folds of teenagers and in early adulthood, and darkens over time.

It is inherited in an autosomal-dominant fashion.

The condition is rare. It was first described in Japan, before recognising that is also occurs elsewhere.

== Genetics ==
This condition is associated with mutations in the a disintegrin and metalloproteinase domain-containing protein 10 (ADAM10) gene. This association was first shown in 2013.

== See also ==
- Skin lesion
- List of cutaneous conditions
