= Kitamura Sayo =

Founder of the Tensho Kotai Jingukyo religious movement

- 北村サヨ
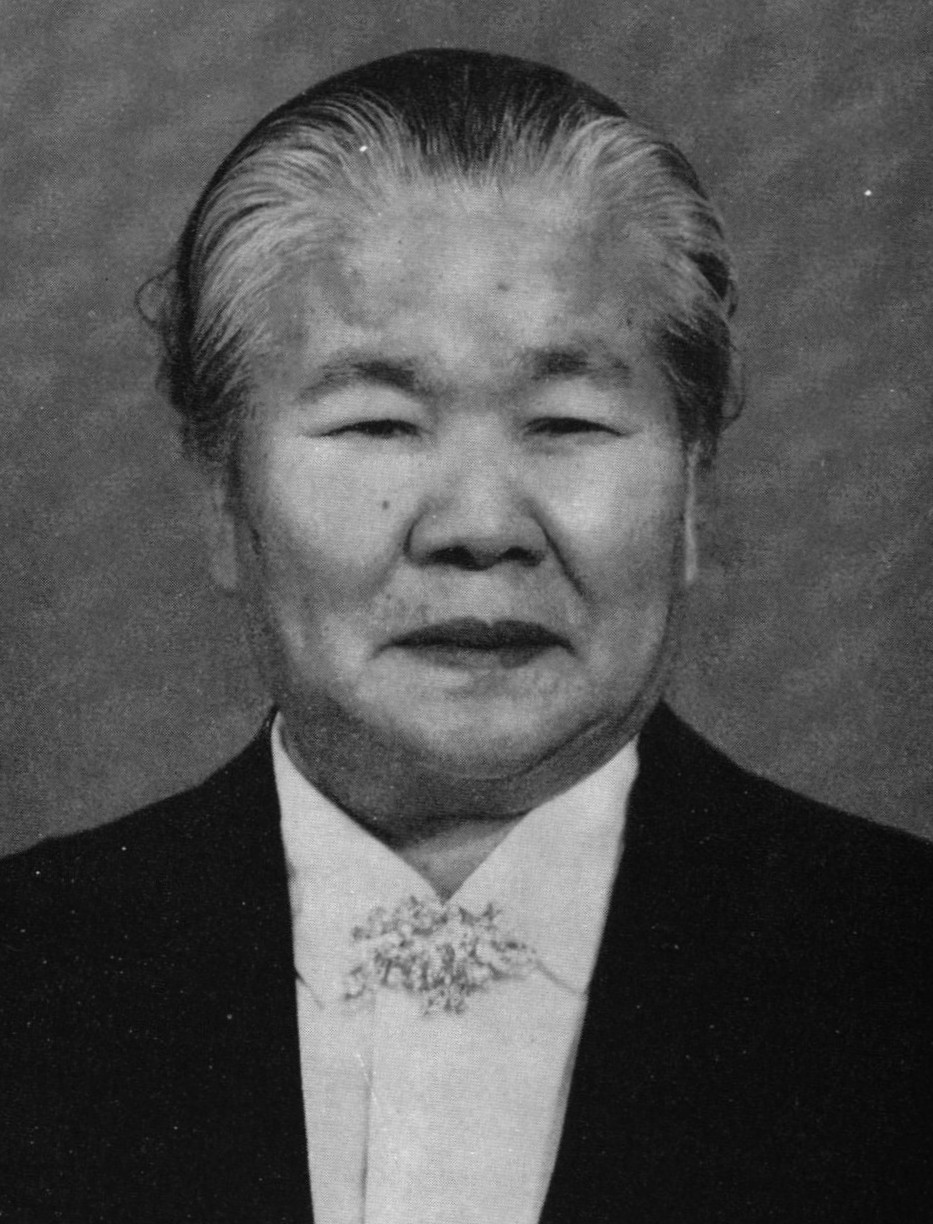
- Kitamura in 1954
- Born: January 1, 1900; Yanai, Yamaguchi, Japan
- Died: December 28, 1967 (aged 67); Tabuse, Yamaguchi, Japan
- Occupation: Founder of the Tenshō Kōtai Jingūkyō
- Title: Ōgamisama (大神様)

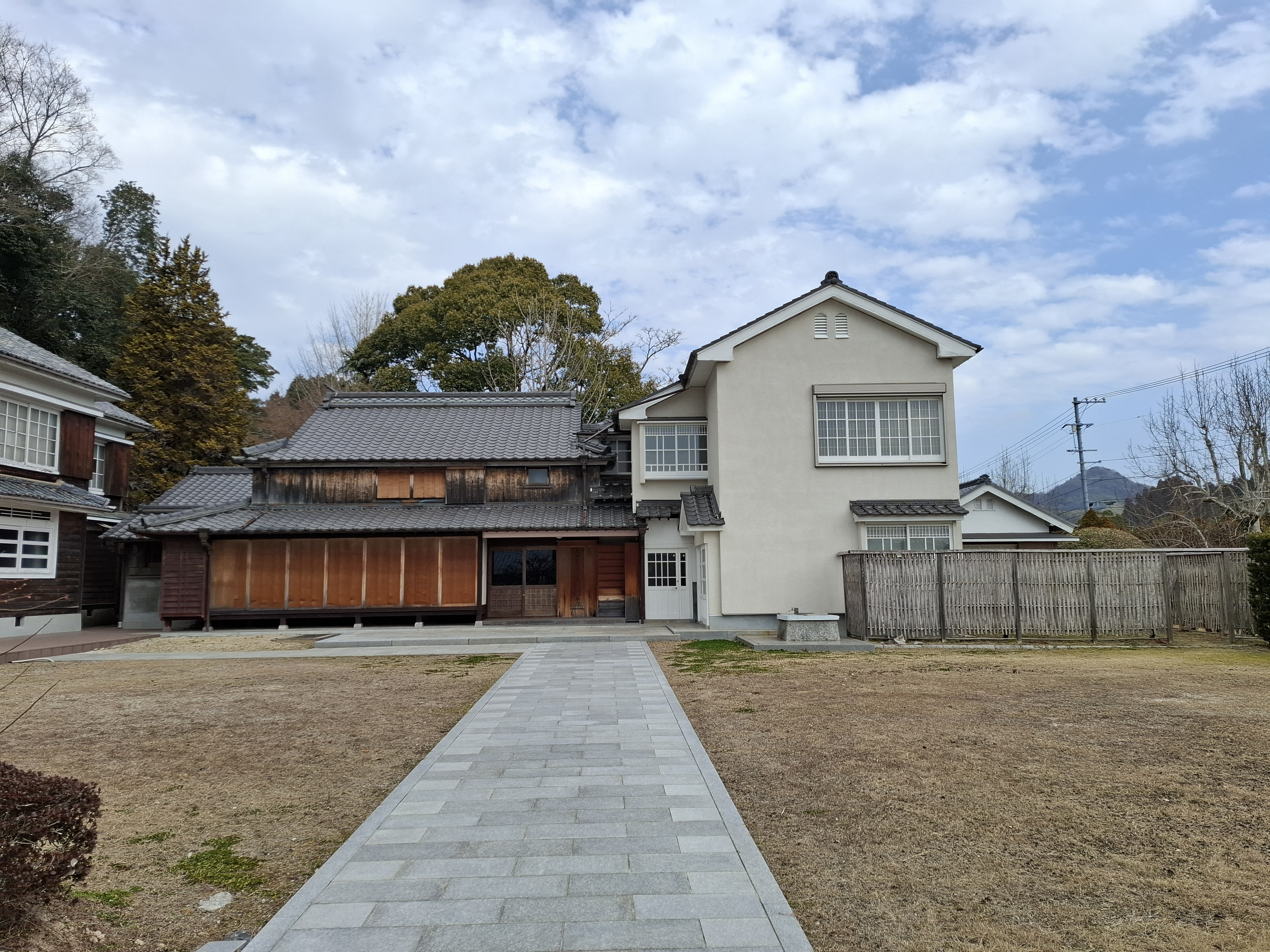
Sayo Kitamura's historical residence, located at the Tenshō Kōtai Jingūkyō headquarters

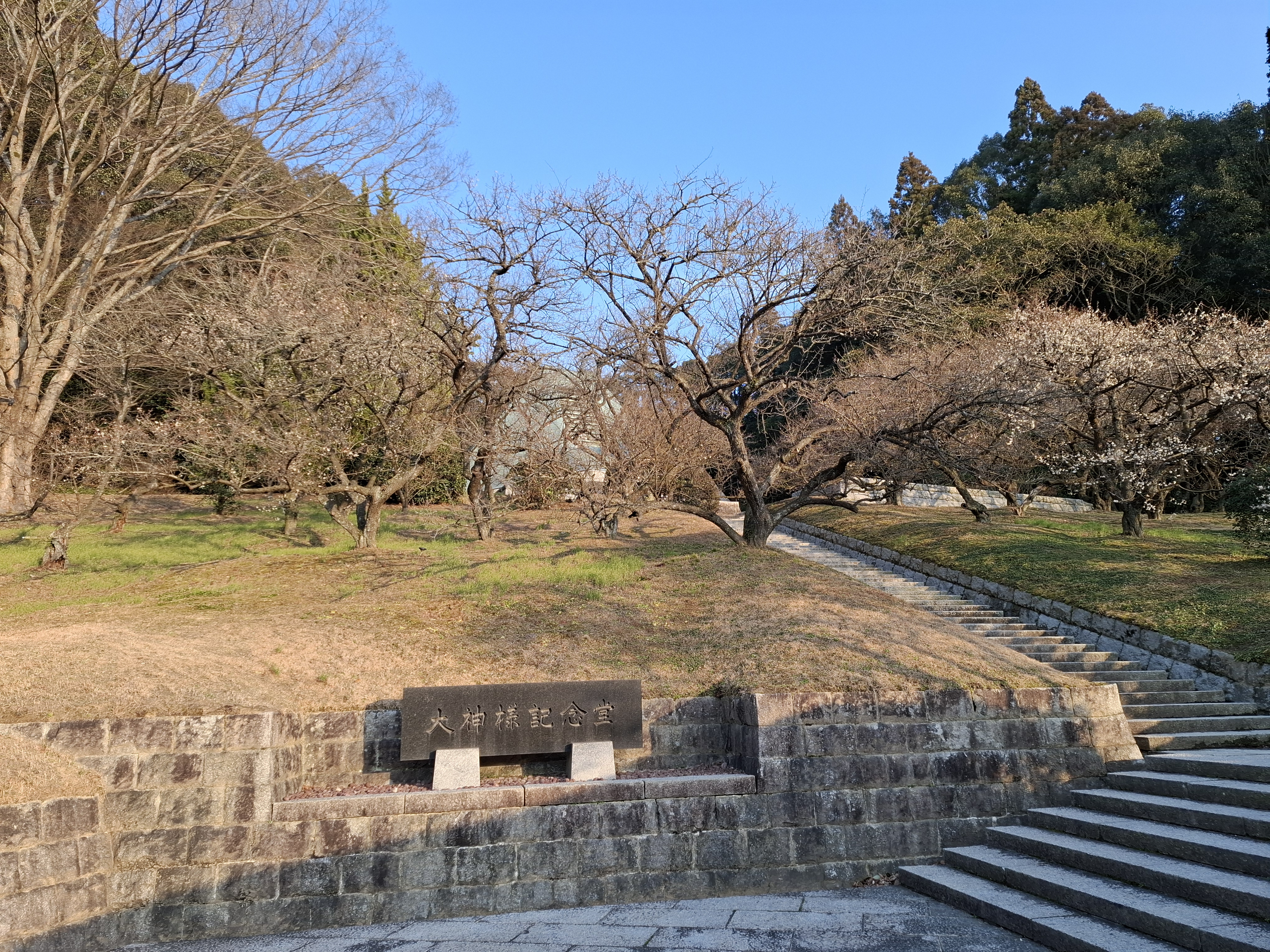
Ogamisama Memorial Hall

Kitamura Sayo (北村 サヨ; January 1, 1900 – December 28, 1967) was the Japanese founder of the "dancing religion", Tenshō Kōtai Jingūkyō (天照皇大神宮教). In the religion, she is known by her followers as Ogamisama (大神様, Ōgamisama). She was known for her pacifism and anti-militarism during the wake of Japan's World War II surrender.

== Early life ==
Kitamura was born on January 1, 1900, in what is now Yanai city, Yamaguchi prefecture, Japan. She was the fourth daughter in a farming family of Jōdo Shinshū Buddhists. She married in November 1920 and moved to Tabuse, Yamaguchi to be with her husband.

== Career ==
In July 1942, a barn on the Kitamura property burned down. Blaming herself for the incident, Kitamura began visiting a shaman. On May 4, 1944, Kitamura was possessed by a spirit, which was later said to be Tensho Kotaijin. She had her first sermon on July 22, 1945, during which she preached she had been sent to save the world, because it was about to end. She said that people should become "true human beings" in order to create a peaceful "land of god", and that Japan's defeat in World War II was just the prelude to a battle between good and evil. Her sermons included singing and dances of "non-ego", which earned the group the nickname "the dancing religion".

In 1946, she incorporated the sect as the Tensho Kotai Jingu Kyo. Her son, Yoshito, performed the administrative functions of the new religion.

As the religion became more established, she became more critical of politicians, the emperor, and other people in power, calling them "maggots" and "maggot beggars" (蛆の乞食). She gained much negative media attention, which she successfully used to publicize her group and gain followers.

In 1952, Kitamura went on a mission trip to Hawaii. Her first overseas branch was in Kalihi, Hawaii. Soon, more branches were formed throughout the world, including in Europe, Africa, and South America. She eventually had over 300,000 followers.

Kitamura died in her home on December 28, 1967. In 1968, her granddaughter, Kitamura Kiyokazu, became head of the religion. Sayo Kitamura is currently memorialized at the Ogamisama Memorial Hall (大神様記念堂, Ogamisama Ki'nendō) at Tenshō Kōtai Jingūkyō's headquarters in Tabuse.

== Family ==
Sayo Kitamura's family members and descendants are:

- Himegamisama (姫神様) – granddaughter, born Kiyokazu Kitamura (北村清和, April 27, 1950 – June 7, 2006), who succeeded Sayo Kitamura as the second spiritual leader of Tenshō Kōtai Jingūkyō
- Wakagamisama (若神様) – son, born Yoshito Kitamura (北村義人). His son (i.e., Sayo Kitamura's grandson) is Tsuneo Kitamura (北村経夫, born 1955), currently a politician. Yoshito Kitamura died in 2007.
- Okugamisama (奥神様) – son's wife
- Akikazusama (明和様) – current female leader, born Akikazu Kitamura (北村明和, January 9, 1990 –), the daughter of Himegamisama (Kiyokazu Kitamura); third and current spiritual leader of Tenshō Kōtai Jingūkyō
