= Shintō Tenkōkyo =

Japanese new religion

- 神道天行居
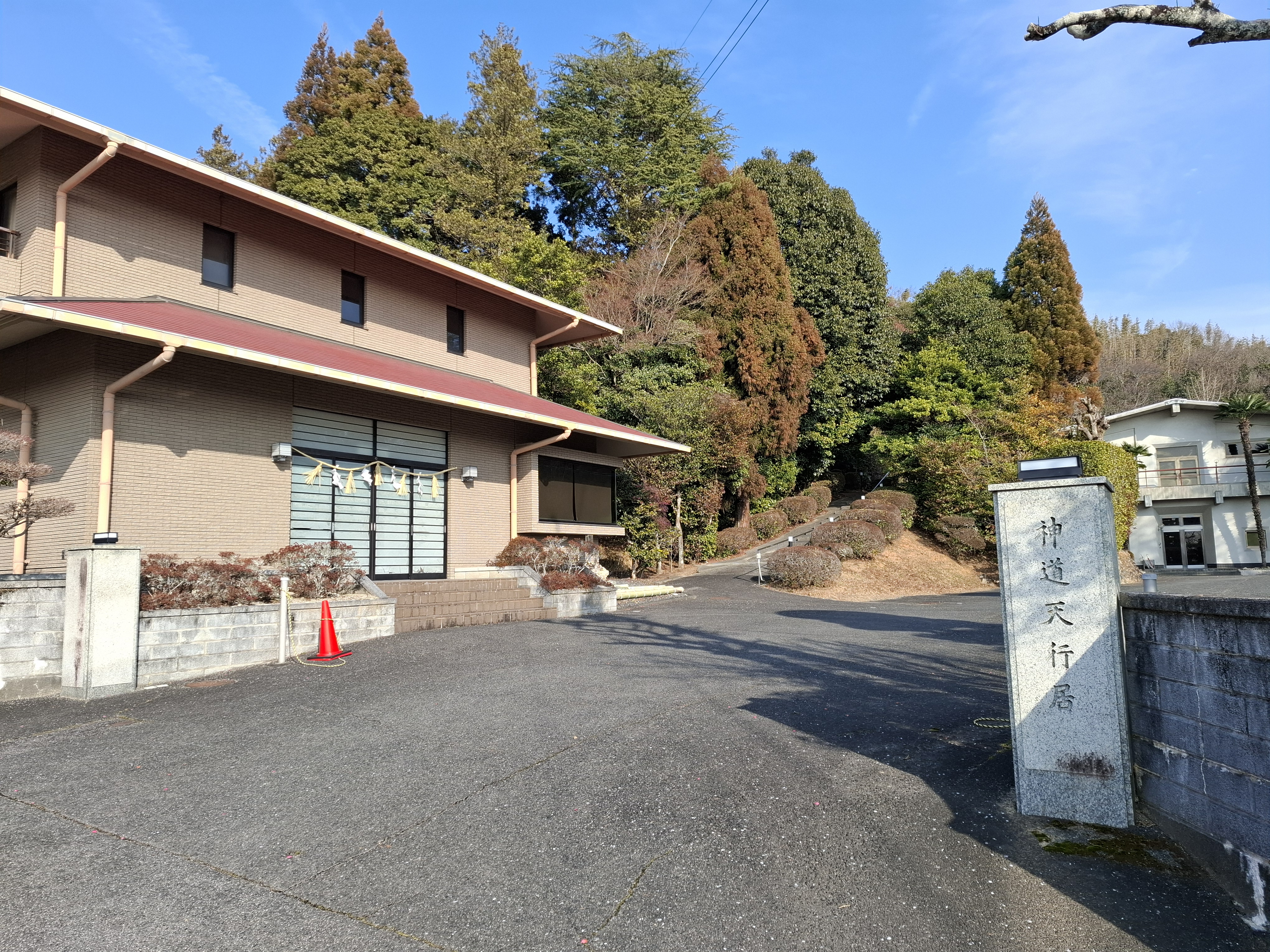
- Shintō Tenkōkyo's headquarters in Tabuse
- Scripture: Tomokiyo Yoshisane zenshū (友清歓真全集) (6 volumes)
- Theology: Worship of Amaterasu, along with various other kami
- Language: Japanese
- Headquarters: Tabuse, Yamaguchi Prefecture
- Founder: Tomokiyo Yoshisane (友清歓真)
- Origin: 1920; Shizuoka
- Separated from: Oomoto
- Separations: Ko-Shintō Senpōkyō (古神道仙法教)
- Official website: tenkoukyo.jp

Shinto Tenkokyo (神道天行居, Shintō Tenkōkyo, Shindō Tenkōkyo), also simply known as Tenkokyo (Tenkōkyo) is a Shinto-based Japanese new religion founded by Tomokiyo Yoshisane (友清歓真) in 1920. Shinto Tenkokyo has several shrines (jinja 神社) on Mount Iwaki or Iwaki-yama (石城山) in Hikari, Yamaguchi Prefecture. Its headquarters is located at the southern base of the mountain in Tabuse.

== History ==
In 1920, the predecessor of the current organization was founded as Kakushin-kai (格神会) in Shizuoka by Tomokiyo Yoshisane, who had been a magazine editor for Oomoto from 1918 and 1919. The organization, later renamed Shintō Tenkōkyo, was registered in 1922. In 1928, Tomokiyo moved Shintō Tenkōkyo from Shizuoka to Tabuse and constructed several shrines on Mount Iwaki around 1930.

== Leadership ==
Shintō Tenkōkyo's leader is called the sōshu (宗主). Tomokiyo Yoshisane was the first leader but resigned in 1931. Afterwards, three different men, none of whom were his blood relatives, became the religious organization's leaders, since Tomokiyo had originally prohibited hereditary succession for the religious organization. In 1952, after Tomokiyo Yoshisane died, the ban on hereditary succession was lifted, and his wife Tomokiyo Misao (友清操; 1899–1990, born Akahori Misao 赤堀操) became the 5th leader of Shintō Tenkōkyo. After Misao's death in 1990, her third daughter Tomokiyo Suzuyo (友清鈴世, born 1932) became the 6th leader of Shintō Tenkōkyo.

== Rituals ==
Shintō Tenkōkyo considers its rituals to be a continuation of Ko-Shintō.

Every November 11 on Mount Iwaki, Shintō Tenkōkyo organizes a nighttime ritual ceremony (山上夜間特別修法) for "universal harmony and world spiritualization" (万有和合・世界霊化). Followers recite the "Ten Prayers" (十言神咒) in dedication to Amaterasu. The first mountain peak ritual was carried out in 1931. Henceforth, this ritual became an annual event performed for the protection of the nation.

A key focus of its activities is "spiritual national defense" (霊的国防, reiteki kokubō), which was practiced extensively during World War II in order to pray for the protection of the Empire of Japan. The religion also practices chinkon kishin (鎮魂帰神) (lit. 'calming the soul and returning to the divine'), a spirit possession technique devised by Honda Chikaatsu (本田親徳) and subsequently transmitted by his disciple Nagasawa Katsutate (長澤雄楯), that is also practiced in Oomoto and Ananaikyo. Shintō Tenkōkyo's practice of chinkon kishin still adheres closely to the original form as taught by Honda Chikaatsu during the 19th century. Today, chinkon kishin is strictly reserved for Shintō Tenkōkyo members and is not open to the general public.

During the early and mid 20th century, Shintō Tenkōkyo priests buried sacred objects (i.e., sacred seals) in the following locations.

- 1927: Mount Hakuba's summit
- 1932: pond at the summit of Mount Bukō's summit in Chichibu
- 1933: Heaven Lake at the summit of Mount Paektu (the most important buried seal); Lake Tōya
- 1934: Sun Moon Lake in Taiwan
- 1936: Lake Biwa; pond of Ninomiya Sengen Jinja (二之宮浅間神社) at the base of Mount Fuji
- 1951: Lake Towada
- 1952: sea near Awaji Island

Another ritual in Shintō Tenkōkyo is mikiyome tamashizume (浄身鎮魂法) (lit. 'body purification and soul strengthening'). According to Tomokiyo, he received this ritual on October 28, 1920 during a kishin session with the kami, Ame no Uzume.

The sun goddess Amaterasu is the main deity worshipped. Tokoto no kajiri (十言の神呪) is a prayer in which the ten syllables of Amaterasu Ōmikami (天照大御神) are pronounced as "A-ma-te-ra-su O-ho-mi-ka-mi" (アマテラス オホミカミ) many times.

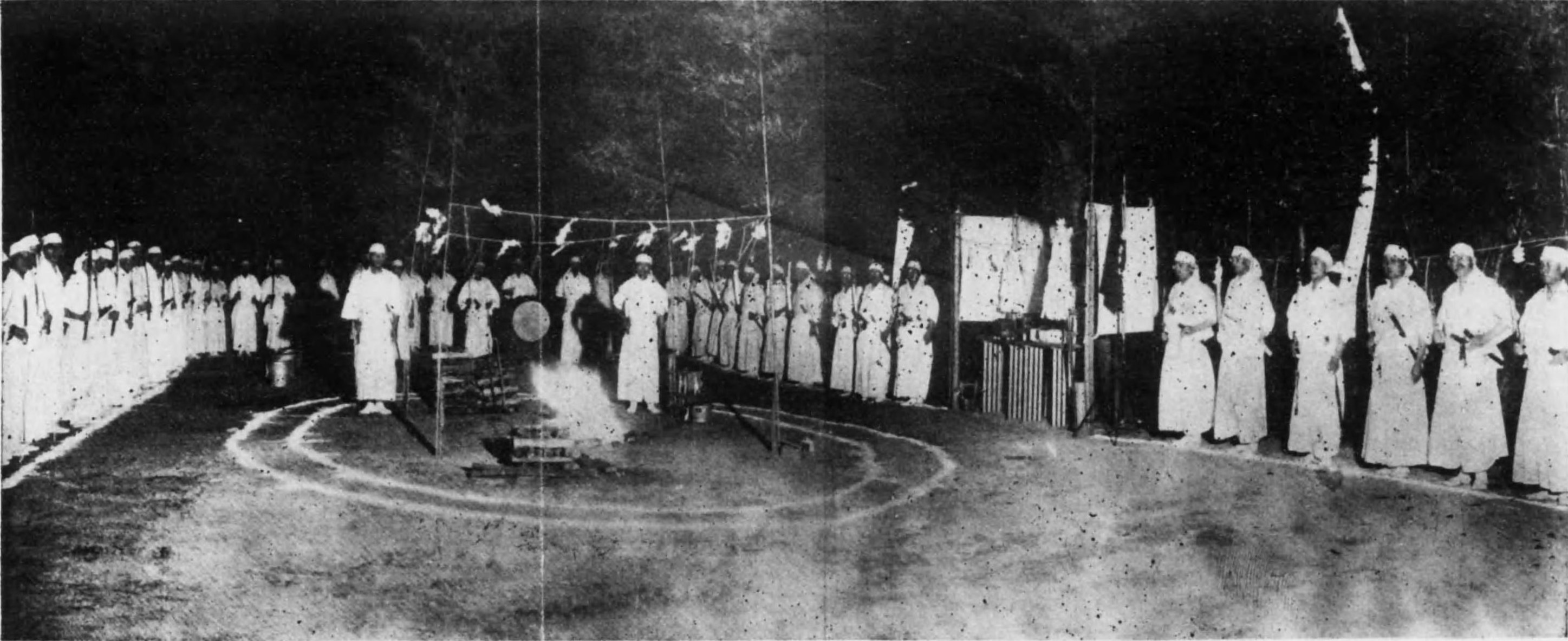
A large wartime night religious ritual ceremony (shūhō 修法) performed by Shintō Tenkōkyo (神道天行居) priests and followers on Mount Iwaki during the Pacific War (c. 1942), to pray for the protection of the Empire of Japan

== Texts ==
=== Tomokiyo Yoshisane zenshū ===
Shintō Tenkōkyo's main religious text is Tomokiyo Yoshisane zenshū (友清歓真全集) (lit. 'The Complete Works of Tomokiyo Yoshisane'), a multiple-volume anthology of writings by Tomokiyo Yoshisane (友清歓真), the religion's founder. There are three editions:

- The Iwakiyama edition (石城山版) was published from 1955 to 1974, as well as in 2002 (volume 6). 2 more volumes containing letters and other materials had been planned, but were never published. From volumes 1 to 5, the publication dates are, respectively, 1955, 1963, 1971, 1968, and 1974.
- The Sangensha (参玄社) edition was published from 1972 to 1974 and consists of 6 volumes, with 4 more volumes planned before Sangensha went bankrupt. This is the smallest edition, with the least number of texts.
- The Hachiman Shoten (八幡書店) edition was published from 1988 to 1989, with 8 volumes total. This is the most comprehensive edition and has the most number of texts, surpassing that of the Iwakiyama edition.

For the Iwakiyama edition, each volume contains the following texts.

- Volume 1
  - 霊学筌蹄 (also available as a separate book)
  - 天行林
  - 古神道秘説 (also available as a separate book)
  - 烏八臼
- Volume 2
  - 神道古義
  - 一心伝
  - 神機鈎玄
- Volume 3
  - 天剣秘帖
  - 古道神髄
  - 霊の世界観
- Volume 4
  - 戦争と古神道
  - 磐門胡餅
  - 闢神霧
- Volume 5
  - 春風遍路 (also available as a separate book)
  - 続春風遍路 (also available as a separate book)
  - 山店抄
  - 草店家風
- Volume 6
  - 神通雑記
  - 磐門真語
  - 無為三年
  - 座談筆記
  - 昌言集
  - 無方帖
  - 神无方
  - 霊界雑考
  - 老閑
  - 信白文艸藁 (also available as a separate book)
  - 山姥乃穴

For the Hachiman Shoten edition, each volume contains the following texts.

- Volume 1
  - 霊学筌蹄
  - 神機鈎玄
  - 闢神霧
  - 特別資料
  - 鎮魂帰神の極意
- Volume 2
  - 天行林
  - 古神道祕説
- Volume 3
  - 神道古義
- Volume 4
  - 古道神髄
- Volume 5
  - 霊の世界観
  - 戦争と古神道
- Volume 6
  - 春風遍路
  - 烏八臼
- Volume 7
  - 玄扈雑記
  - 霊界雑考
  - 山店抄
  - 草店家風
  - 座談筆記
  - 老閑
  - 信白文艸藁
  - 家醜雑記
  - 神无方
  - 友清磐山先生詩歌集
- Volume 8
  - 磐門胡餅
  - 天剣秘帖
  - 名霊通
  - 一心伝
  - 山姥乃穴
  - 無為三年
  - 神通雑記
  - 無方帖
  - 珠玉篇雑載
  - 磐門真語
  - 瓦釜雷鳴
  - 音霊の法について
  - これなら

For the Sangensha edition, the 6 volumes are as follows.

1. 霊学筌蹄
2. 天行林
3. 古神道祕説
4. 神道古義 天之巻
5. 神道古義 地之巻
6. 神道古義 人之巻

The inclusion of texts in the Hachiman, Iwakiyama, and Sangensha editions can be compared as follows.

Title (Japanese)	Title (romaji)	Title (English translation)	Hachiman volume no.	Iwakiyama volume no.	Sangensha volume no.
霊学筌蹄	Reigaku Sentei	A Guide to Spiritual Studies	1	1	1
神機鈎玄	Shinki Kōgen	Probing the Depths of Divine Mysteries	1	2	
闢神霧	Hekishinmu	Clearing the Divine Mist	1	4	
特別資料	Tokubetsu Shiryō	Special Materials	1		
鎮魂帰神の極意	Chinkon Kishin no Gokui	The Ultimate Secrets of Chinkon Kishin (Spirit Pacification and Invocation)	1		
天行林	Tengyōrin	Forest of Heavenly Action	2	1	2
古神道祕説	Koshintō Hisetsu	Secret Teachings of Ancient Shinto	2	1	3
神道古義	Shintō Kogi	Ancient Meanings of Shinto	3	2	4–6
古道神髄	Kodō Shinzui	The Essence of the Ancient Way	4	3	
霊の世界観	Rei no Sekaikan	The Spiritual Worldview	5	3	
戦争と古神道	Sensō to Koshintō	War and Ancient Shinto	5	4	
春風遍路	Shunpū Henro	Spring Breeze Pilgrimage	6	5	
烏八臼	Uhakkyū	Crow and Eight Mortars	6	1	
霊界雑考	Reikai Zakkō	Miscellaneous Thoughts on the Spirit World	7	6	
山店抄	Santenshō	Notes from the Mountain Hut	7	5	
草店家風	Sōten Kafū	Traditions of the Thatched Hut	7	5	
座談筆記	Zadan Hikki	Records of Discussions	7	6	
老閑	Rōkan	Leisure in Old Age	7	6	
信白文艸藁	Shinbaku Bunsōkō	Rough Drafts of Shinbaku	7	6	
家醜雑記	Kashū Zakki	Miscellaneous Notes on Private Family Matters	7		
神无方	Shinmuhō	The Formless Divine	7	6	
友清磐山先生詩歌集	Tomokiyo Banzan Sensei Shikashū	Anthology of Poetry by Tomokiyo Banzan	7		
磐門胡餅	Banmon Kobei	Flatbreads of Banmon	8	4	
天剣秘帖	Tenken Hichō	Secret Notes of the Heavenly Sword	8	3	
名霊通	Meireitsū	Spiritual Communication of Names	8		
一心伝	Isshinden	Transmission of the Single Mind	8	2	
山姥乃穴	Yamanba no Ana	Cave of the Old Woman in the Mountain	8	6	
無為三年	Mui Sannen	Three Years of Non-Action	8	6	
神通雑記	Jintsū Zakki	Miscellaneous Notes on Divine Powers	8	6	
無方帖	Muhōchō	The Formless Book	8	6	
珠玉篇雑載	Shugyokuhen Zassai	Miscellaneous Entries from the Precious Volume	8		
磐門真語	Banmon Shingo	True Words of Banmon	8	6	
瓦釜雷鳴	Gafu Raimei	The Thunderous Noise of Earthen Pots	8		
音霊の法について	Otodama no Hō ni Tsuite	On the Method of Otodama (Spirit of Sound)	8		
これなら	Korenara	If That Is the Case	8		
昌言集	Shōgenshū	Collection of Excellent Sayings		6	

In October 1919, Tomokiyo published The origin and practice of chinkon kishin (鎮魂帰神の原理及応用, Chinkon kishin no genri oyobi ōyō), a monograph about chinkon kishin. After it quickly sold out, it was revised as The essence of chinkon kishin (鎮魂帰神の極意, Chinkon kishin no gokui) in May 1920. This revised version is included in the first volume of Tomokiyo Yoshisane zenshū as published by Hachiman in 2004. The full text of Shintō montai (真道問対) by Honda Chikaatsu is attached at the end of Chinkon kishin no gokui (鎮魂帰神の極意). The text consists of 114 questions from Soejima Taneomi, along with answers from Honda, in literary Chinese.

A Guide to Spirit Studies (霊学筌蹄, Reigaku sentei) is a synopsis of Tomokiyo's main teachings and contains two chapters about chinkon kishin. The text also has three chapters on the "sound spirit method" (音霊法, otodamahō), "name spirit method" (名霊法, nadamahō), and "divine divination method" (神卜法, shinbokuhō). Originally published in August 1921, it is included in the first volume of all editions of Tomokiyo Yoshisane zenshū (友清歓真全集).

=== Other texts ===
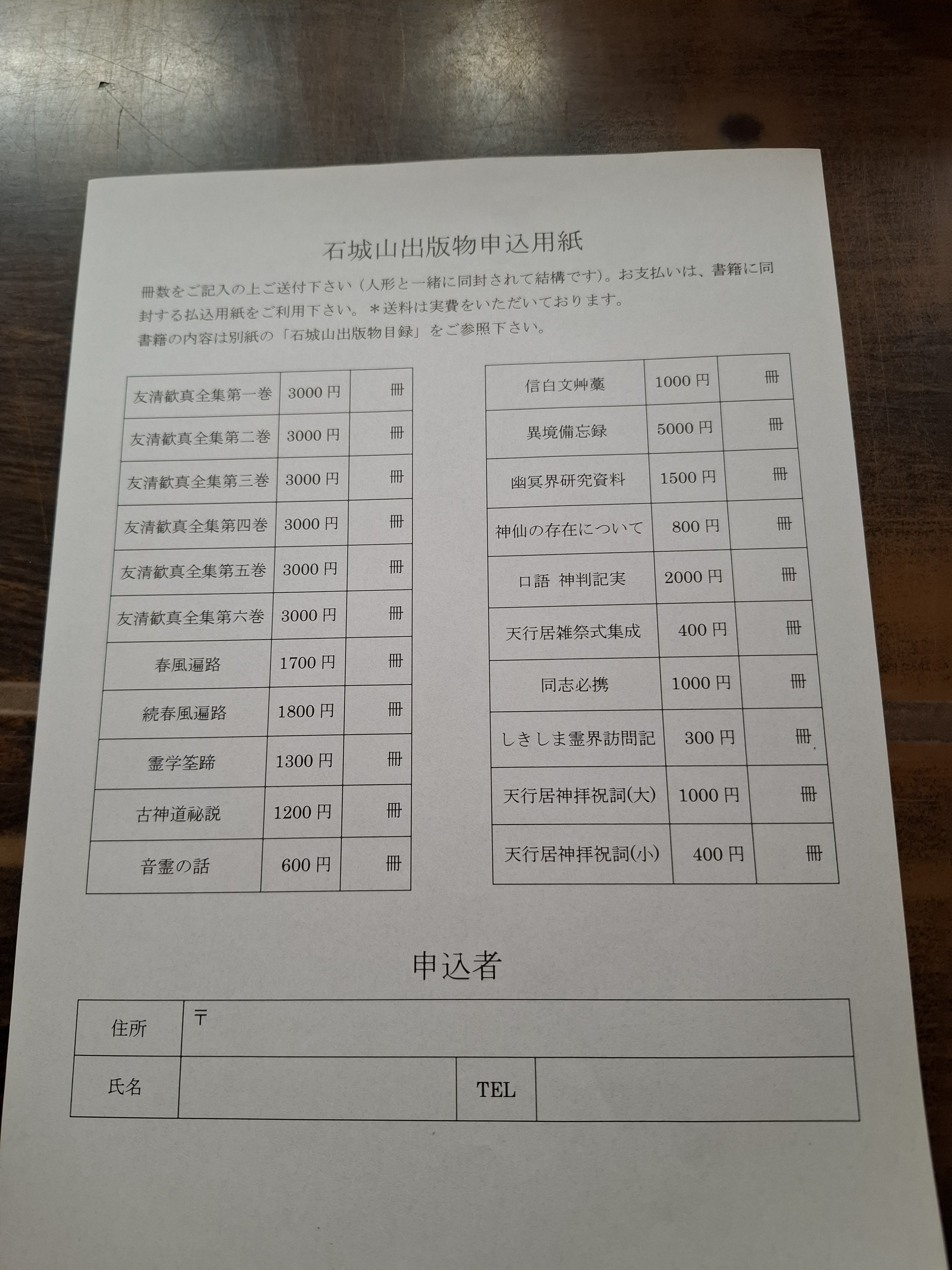
Shintō Tenkōkyo's publication catalog in 2026

Other than the 6 volumes of Tomokiyo Yoshisane zenshū (友清歓真全集), the Iwakiyama (石城山) publishing house in Tabuse, which is the publishing arm of Shintō Tenkōkyo, currently publishes the following books as of 2026. Some of the books are also duplicated in various volumes of Tomokiyo Yoshisane zenshū (友清歓真全集).

- 春風遍路 (also in Tomokiyo Yoshisane zenshū)
- 続春風遍路 (also in Tomokiyo Yoshisane zenshū)
- 霊学筌蹄 (also in Tomokiyo Yoshisane zenshū)
- 古神道秘説 (also in Tomokiyo Yoshisane zenshū)
- 音霊の話
- 信白文艸藁 (also in Tomokiyo Yoshisane zenshū)
- 異境備忘録
- 幽冥界研究資料
- 神仙の存在について
- 口語 神判記実
- 天行居雑祭式集成
- 同志必携
- しきしま霊界訪問記
- 友清歓真先生御書跡集 (1997) (collection of calligraphic works by Tomokiyo Yoshisane; accompanied by an explanation guide titled 先師御書跡抄解)

Other texts by Tomokiyo Yoshisane include:

- 天行居用語辞典 (3 volumes)
- ますみのむすび (1991)
- 葦原神社について (1993)
- 新世紀の天啓: 石城山への路 (1952; revised 1998)
- 周易の研究
- 神山鈔録 (3 volumes)
- 霊的国防の意義
- 神仙霊典: 幽冥秘録
- 皇道大本の研究
- 靈界雜考
- 神界の経綸と天行居の出現
- 神感録
- 寿書
- 石門漫録
- 神と人との世界改造運動
- 神仙の秘区石城山と人類信仰の家郷天行居
- 神能伊吹
- 神道天行居案内

Tenkōkyo pamphlet series (天行居パンフレット叢書), mostly published from 1934 to around 1940:

1. 石城山と天行居
2. 十言の神咒
3. 神仙の存在に就て
4. 国家起源論の根本誤謬
5. 正眞の古神道: 立體史觀の再現
6. 天意と現下の大戦
7. ?
8. しきしま霊界訪問記 (1994)

Parts of the religion's secret lore are contained in a book called the Book of Transmissions (格神講伝書|伝書, Densho), which is only available for members who have completed the initial training seminar. The 1937 version contains some texts by Honda Chikaatsu, Ubusuna hyakushu 産土百首 and Reikon hyakushu 霊魂百首.

=== Newspaper ===
Shintō Tenkōkyo's newspaper, typically published monthly, is titled Kodō (古道) (lit. 'Ancient Way'). The newspaper was founded in 1924 and was renamed during the following dates.

- 1924: Tenkō jihō 天行時報
- 1925: Tenkō shinbun 天行新聞
- 1927: Kodō 古道
- August 1934: Tenkōdō 天行道
- December 1934: Kodō 古道

After World War II, it was renamed a few more times, listed below in order of renaming:

- Tenkō shinbun 天行新聞
- Michi no hikari みちの光
- Daidō / Ōmichi 大道
- Kodō 古道 (current name)

Kodō no. 820 (October 1988) contains a detailed biography of Tomokiyo Yoshisane and a chronology of Shintō Tenkōkyo.

Some of the newspaper issue numbers and the years during which they were published include:

- No. 225 (1933)
- No. 322 (1941)
- No. 409 (January 1950)
- No. 882 (December 1993)
- No. 966 (2000)
- No. 1249 (2023)

== Shrines ==
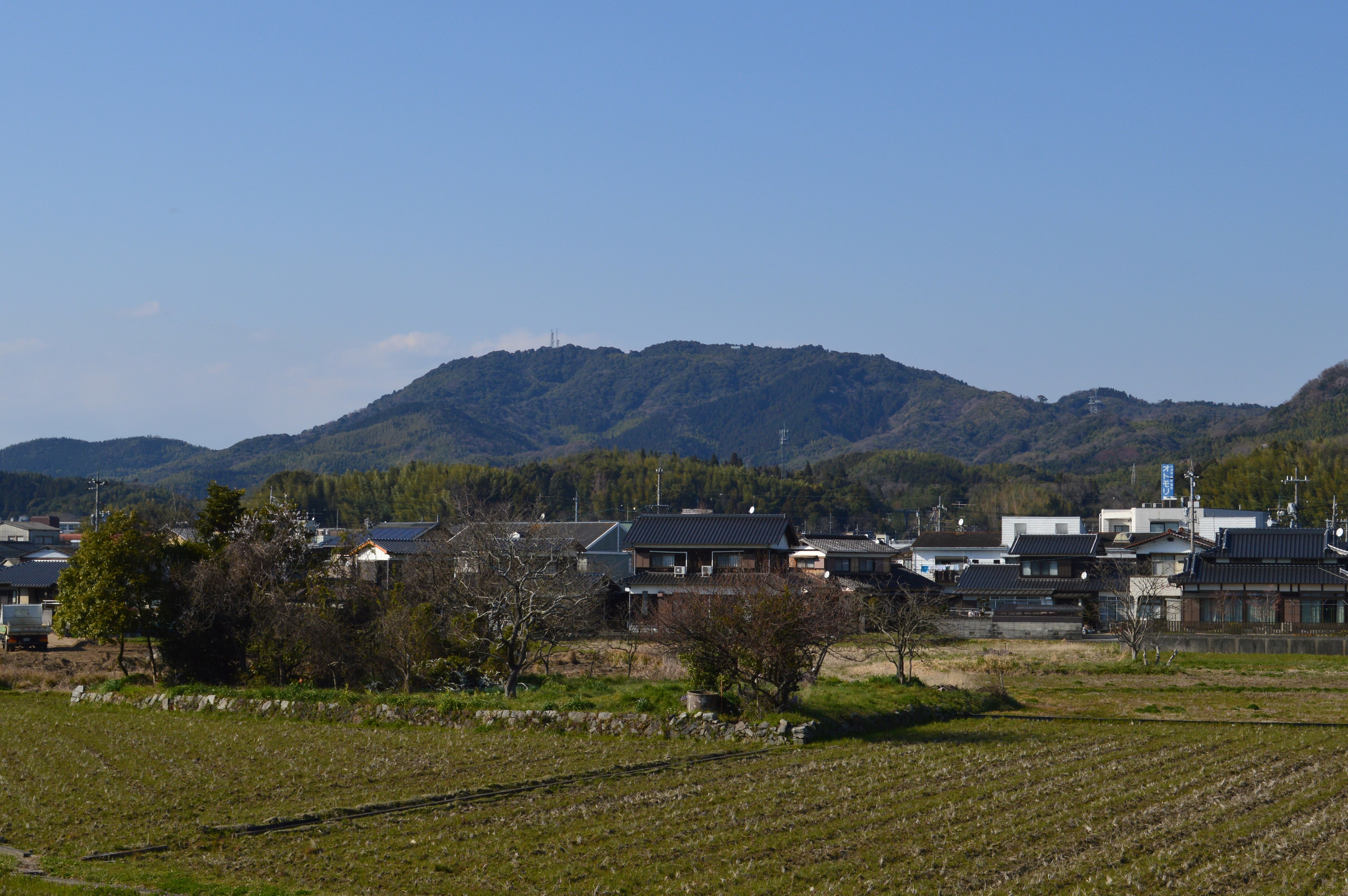
The summit of Mount Iwaki has several jinja (神社) affiliated with Shintō Tenkōkyo.

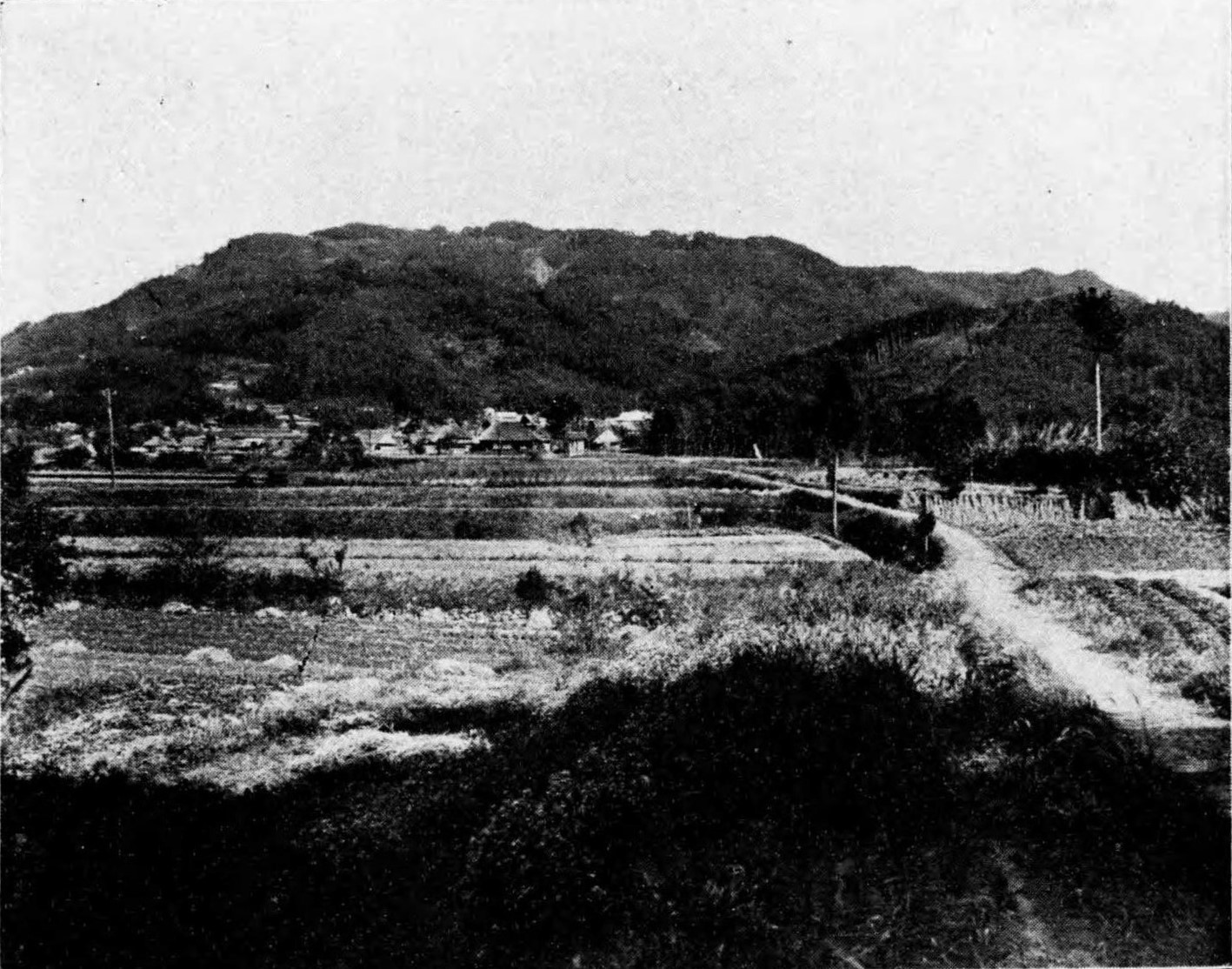
A photograph of Mount Iwaki taken on November 22, 1927

Shintō Tenkōkyo's shrines are located on Mount Iwaki (石城山), located to the north of the town of Tabuse in Yamaguchi Prefecture. The religion pronounces the name of the mountain as Iwaki-yama, but outside the religion the conventional pronunciation is Iwaki-san. It is the most sacred mountain of Shintō Tenkōkyo and is considered to be the earthly representation of the heavenly gathering place of the gods, similar to Oomoto's treatment of Mount Hongū in Ayabe. For a complete list of shrines on Mount Iwaki, see Mount Iwaki (Yamaguchi) § Shrines.

At the Shintō Tenkōkyo headquarters located at the southern base of Mount Iwaki in Tabuse, there is a small auxiliary shrine known as Ubusuna Sansha (産須那三社). Ubusuna Sansha represents three larger shrines in Tabuse, which are Shikishima Jinja (石城神社) at the top of Mount Iwaki, Yawata Hachiman Jinja (八和田八幡神社) located southeast of Mount Iwaki, and Ishinokuchi Hachimangu (石ノ口八幡宮) at the southwestern base of Mount Iwaki. The shinden (神殿) of the headquarters, known as the Shintō Tenkōkyo honbu shinden (神道天行居本部神殿), was founded on May 27, 1928.

Iwakisan Kōgoishi (石城山神籠石), the ruins of an ancient castle, is located to the northeast of the Shinto Tenkokyo shrine cluster.

== Similar religions ==
Ko-Shintō Senpōkyō (古神道仙法教), currently headquartered in Sakai, Osaka Prefecture, is a splinter religion derived from Shintō Tenkōkyo. Masai Kieki (正井頎益, 1907–1970), who used to be a member of Shintō Tenkōkyo before the end of World War II, founded the organization in 1946 and officially registered it as Shintō Senpōkyō (神道仙法教) in 1949. After his death, the organization was renamed as Ko-Shintō Senpōkyō (古神道仙法教). The organization's teachings are based on the writings of Hirata Atsutane and Miyaji Suii (宮地水位, 1852–1904).

Another related organization is Shinseidō (神仙道; also known as Miyaji Shinseidō 宮地神仙道), founded by Miyaji Suii (宮地水位, whom Shintō Tenkōkyo recognizes as having transmitted divine knowledge to Tomokiyo Yoshisane) and led by Shimizu Shūtoku (清水宗徳). It is headquartered in Godaisan (五台山), Kōchi and is heavily influenced by Chinese Taoism.

== See also ==
- Ananaikyo
- Chinkon kishin
