= Tabuse =

Tabuse 田布施町
- Town
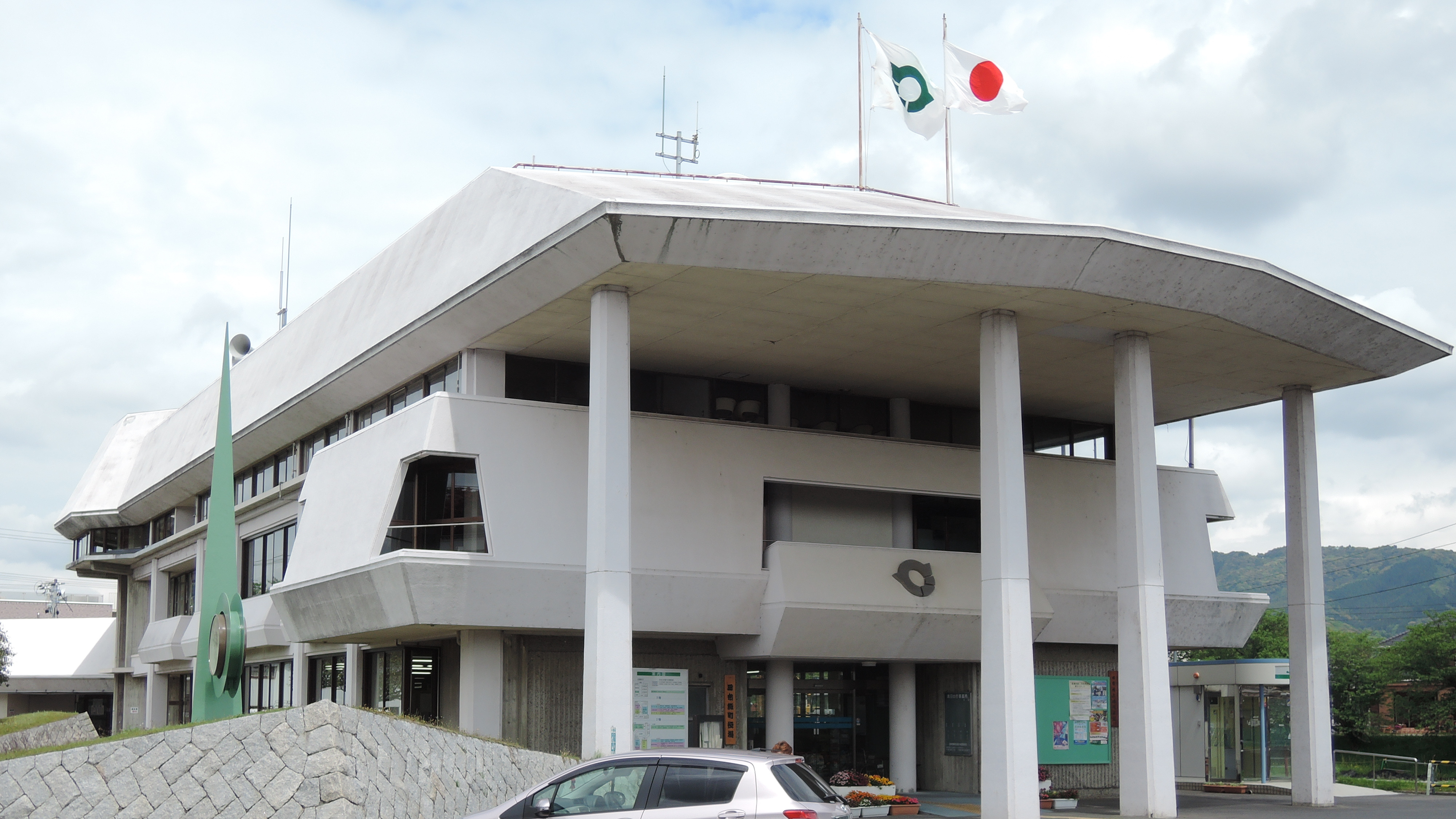
- Tabuse town hall

- Flag Emblem
- Location of Tabuse in Yamaguchi Prefecture

- Location in Japan
- Coordinates: 33°57′17″N 132°2′29″E
- Country: Japan
- Region: Chūgoku; San'yō
- Prefecture: Yamaguchi
- District: Kumage

Government
  - Mayor: Higashi Kouji

Area
  - Total: 50.42 km^{2} (19.47 sq mi)

Population (May 31, 2023)
  - Total: 14,411
  - Density: 285.8/km^{2} (740.3/sq mi)
- Time zone: UTC+09:00 (JST)
- City hall address: 3440-1 Shimodabuse, Tabuse-cho, Kumage-gun, Yamaguchi-ken 742-1592
- Website: Official website
- Symbols
- Flower: Rhododendron farrerae
- Tree: Kurogane holly (Ilex rotunda)

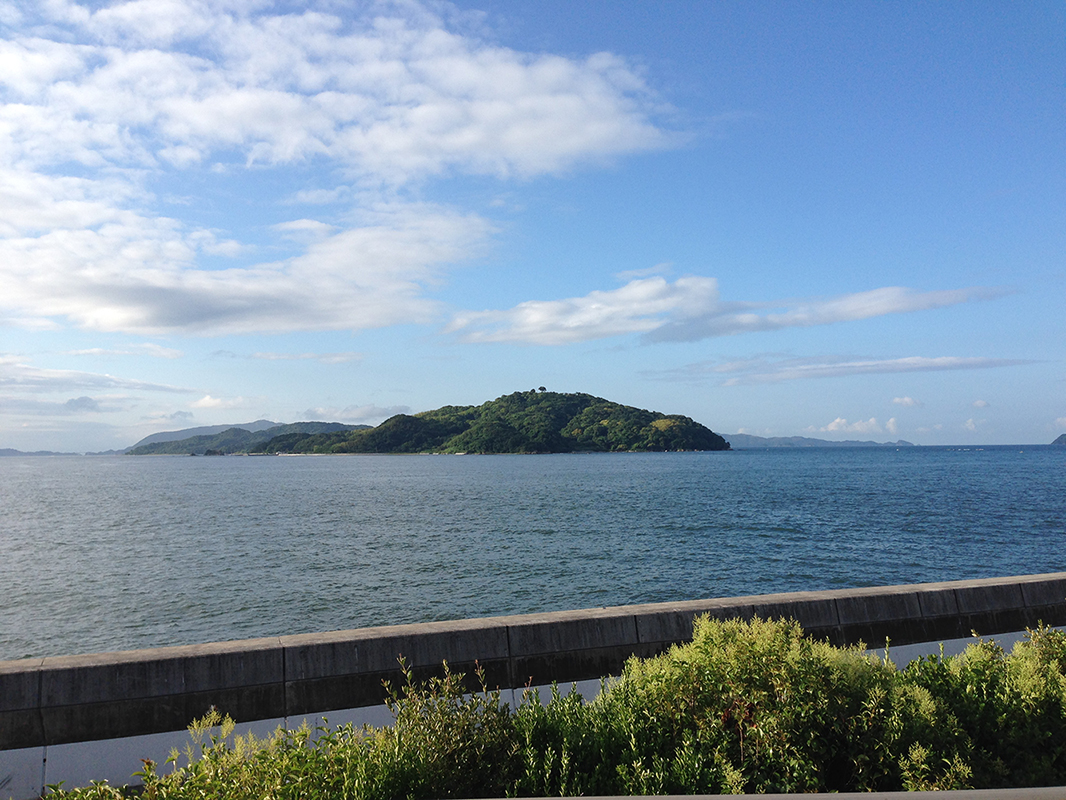
Umashima

Tabuse (田布施町, Tabuse-chō) is a town located in Kumage District, Yamaguchi Prefecture, Japan. As of 31 May 2023, the town had an estimated population of 14,411 in 6947 households and a population density of 290 persons per km^{2}. The total area of the town is 50.42 square kilometres (19.47 sq mi).

== Geography ==
Tabuse spreads inland from the Seto Inland Sea coast at the base of the Murotsu Peninsula in southeastern Yamaguchi Prefecture. In addition, the town includes the small inhabited island of Umashima in Seto Inland Sea. The northwest is mountainous, and small rivers that originate in this area join to form the Tabuse River, which flows through the center of town. The Kogyoji neighborhood of Tabuse is an exclave surrounded by Hikari and Yanai cities.

=== Neighbouring municipalities ===
Yamaguchi Prefecture

- Hikari
- Hirao
- Iwakuni
- Yanai

=== Climate ===
Tabuse has a humid subtropical climate (Köppen climate classification Cfa) with very warm summers and cool winters. The average annual temperature in Tabuse is 15.5 °C. The average annual rainfall is 1678 mm with September as the wettest month. The temperatures are highest on average in July, at around 26.0 °C, and lowest in January, at around 5.5 °C.

== Demographics ==
Per Japanese census data, the population of Tabuse has been steady for the past 70 years.

Historical population
Year	Pop.	±%
1940	12,993	—
1950	17,191	+32.3%
1960	15,609	−9.2%
1970	14,547	−6.8%
1980	16,636	+14.4%
1990	16,568	−0.4%
2000	16,217	−2.1%
2010	15,984	−1.4%
Tabuse population statistics

== History ==
The area of Tabuse was part of an ancient Suō Province. During the Edo Period, the area was part of the holdings of Chōshū Domain. Following the Meiji restoration, the village of Tabuse within Kumage District, Yamaguchi was established with the creation of the modern municipalities system on April 1, 1889. Tabuse as elevated to town status on February 11, 1921. On January 1, 1955, Tabuse annexed the villages of Ogō, Marifu and Jōnan.

In 2018, a civil servant reported property tax misconduct by the mayor of Tabuse and the head of the tax collection management agency.

== Government ==
Tabuse has a mayor-council form of government with a directly elected mayor and a unicameral town council of 12 members. Tabuse, together with the towns of Kaminoseki and Hirao contributes one member to the Yamaguchi Prefectural Assembly. In terms of national politics, the town is part of the Yamaguchi 2nd district of the lower house of the Diet of Japan.

== Economy ==
Tabuse has a rural economy based on agriculture and commercial fishing. There is one small industrial park.

== Education ==
Tabuse has four public elementary school and one public junior high school operated by the town government, and one public high school operated by the Yamaguchi Prefectural Board of Education.

== Religion ==
Tabuse is home to the headquarters of the Japanese new religions Tenshō Kōtai Jingūkyō and Shintō Tenkōkyo.

== Transportation ==
=== Railway ===
JR West (JR West) - San'yō Main Line

- Tabuse

=== Highways ===
- National Route 188

== Notable people from Tabuse ==
- Nobusuke Kishi, Prime Minister of Japan from 1957 to 1960
- Eisaku Satō, Prime Minister of Japan from 1964 to 1972 and younger brother of Kishi
- Kitamura Sayo, founder of Tenshō Kōtai Jingūkyō
