= Tenshō Kōtai Jingūkyō =

Japanese new religious movement

- 天照皇大神宮教
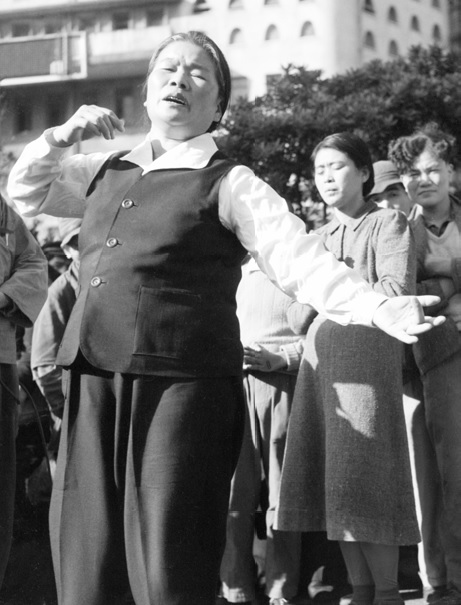
- Sayo Kitamura, the religion's founder, preaching to a crowd in 1948
- Scripture: Seisho (生書) (4 volumes)
- Founder: Sayo Kitamura
- Origin: 1945; Tabuse, Japan

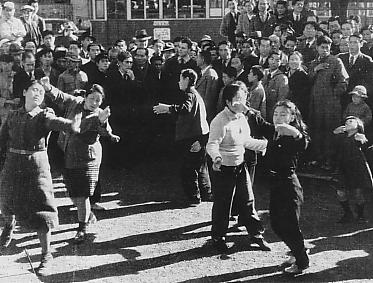
Muga no Mai (Tensho Kotaijingu-Kyo's dance), 1948

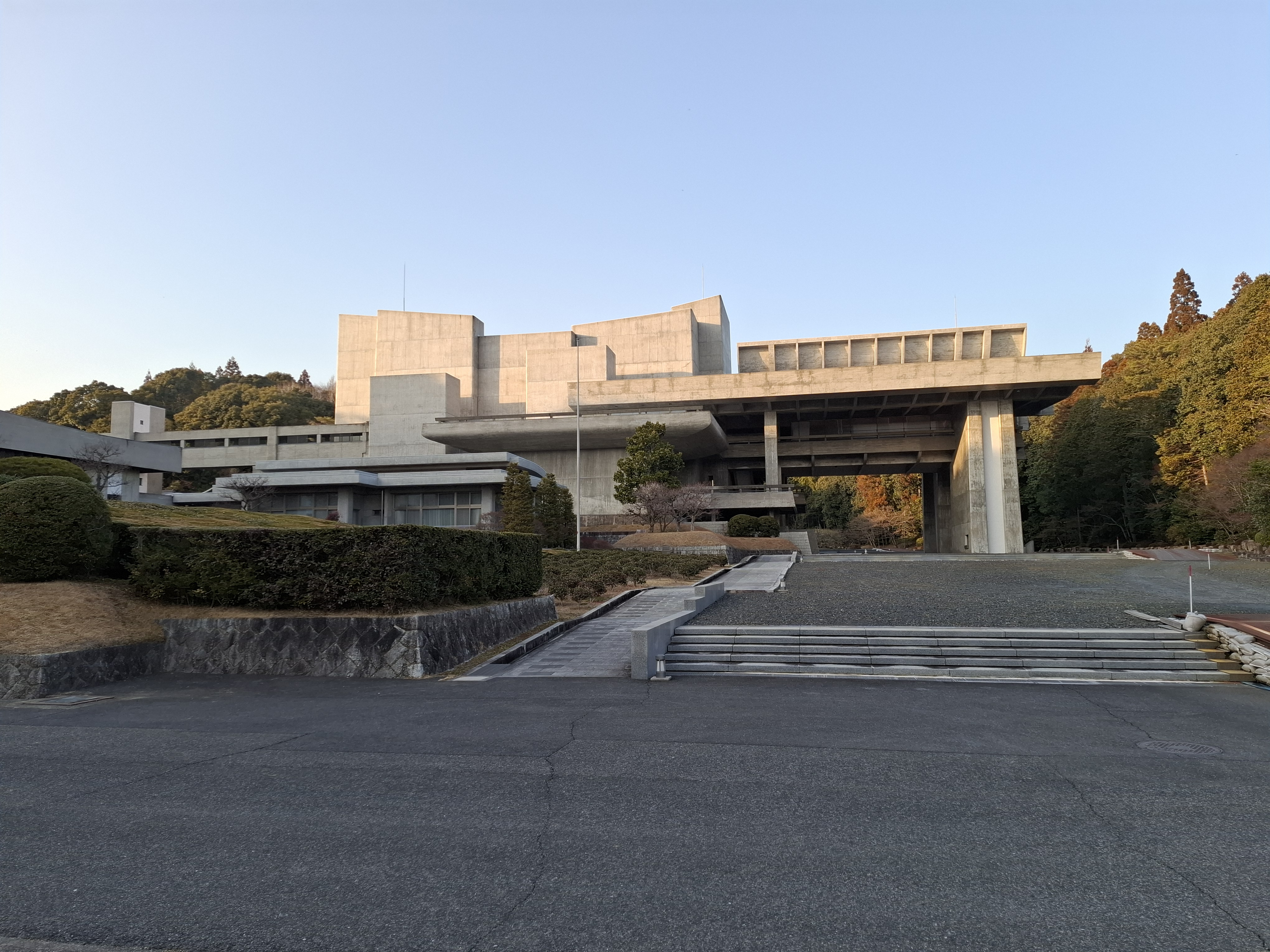
The main dōjō at the Tenshō Kōtai Jingūkyō headquarters in Tabuse was built during the 1960s.

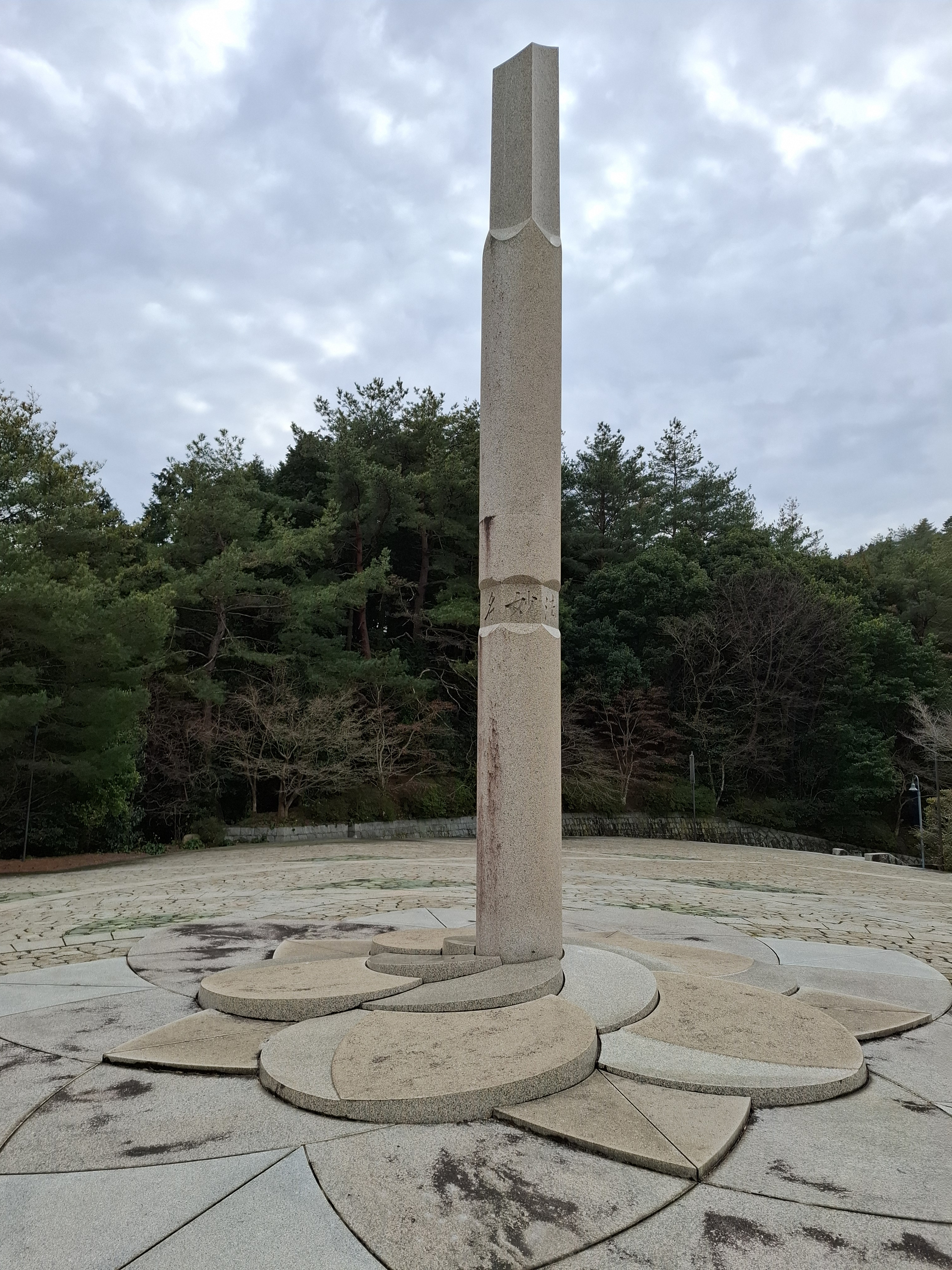
A concrete pillar now marks the summit of Mount Ongaku, where Sayo Kitamura received divine revelations during the 1940s. The mantra Na Myōhō Renge Kyō (名妙法連結経) is written on the pillar.

Tenshō Kōtai Jingūkyō (Japanese: 天照皇大神宮教) is a Japanese new religious movement. The movement began activities in 1945, and reportedly includes 450,000 members. It was established by Sayo Kitamura (北村 サヨ) (1900–1967), who was possessed by the deity Tenshō Kōtaijin (天照皇大神) on May 4, 1944. She is referred to as Ogamisama (大神様) by the religion's followers.

Its headquarters are in Tabuse (田布施町, Tabuse-chō), a town in Kumage District, Yamaguchi, Japan.

== History ==
Following the burning of her family barn by an arsonist in 1942, Kitamura was told by a healer to begin intense prayer and ascetic practices, taking cold baths and going to worship at a nearby shrine in the early morning, which continued for a few years. In 1944, she became possessed by a spirit that later claimed to be Tenshō Kōtai Jingū. The deity gave her orders, and if she failed to obey, it caused her immense pain. Later that year the deity claimed that it would use her to save the world. Today, a tall concrete pillar marks the summit of Mount Ongaku (恩額山, Ongaku-zan) (33.952640°N 132.013410°E), the mountain where Kitamura received this divine revelation.

Kitamura started to speak more harshly and dressed in masculine clothes, claiming that it was more suitable for the way she now spoke. She also became openly critical of other established religions and the Japanese government and even the emperor, predicting that the war would end badly for Japan. During the first few years after her possession, Kitamura held daily sermons at her own home, and her reputation began to spread in Tabuse. After the war ended, she proved her predictions to be correct, and people began devoting themselves to her teachings. Followers claimed to be cured of their illnesses from hearing her sermons and practising her teachings.

Tenshō Kōtai Jingūkyō began garnering attention from the press in April 1946. When Kitamura was imprisoned and tried for refusing to comply with compulsory rice quotas in the area, a local newspaper began publishing articles about her trial. Throughout the course of her trial, Kitamura also drew the interest of the prosecutor, Watanabe Tomekichi, who visited her during her probation to listen to her sermons, and converted soon after the trial ended. Watanabe later became an important figure for the religion.

Tenshō Kōtai Jingūkyō registered under the Religious Corporations Ordinance on January 11, 1947.

When Kitamura died in 1967, she was succeeded as head of Tenshō Kōtai Jingūkyō by her granddaughter Kiyokazu.

== Beliefs and practices ==
Kitamura, or Ogamisama, preached abandoning one's attachments to the "maggot world," especially to traditional, established religions, which she believed to be idol worship. Kitamura and her followers claimed that she was a messiah equal to Jesus Christ and Buddha.

Followers practice a dance called muga no mai (無我の舞, "Dance of the non-self" or "Dance of the non-ego"), which is why the religion is often referred to as the "dancing religion" (踊る宗教, Odoru shūkyō). They also chant Na Myōhō Renge Kyō (名妙法連結経) (with the kanji differing that of the typical Buddhist version) as part of their daily practice.

The religion's scripture is the Seisho (生書), which is published in four volumes. The religion's teachings are known as mioshie (御教え), while followers are referred to as dōshi (同志) (lit. 'comrades').

Tenshō Kōtai Jingūkyō's international headquarters in Tabuse consists of a large concrete dōjō built in 1962. The third floor is the main worship hall consisting of 550 tatami mats, with one statue of Ogamisama and natural light coming in from the rooftop. There is are also dōjōs in Tokyo and Honolulu. During dōjō sessions, Ogamisama's recordings are played. About 3,000 hours of recordings have been archived. At the headquarters, there is also a house where Ogamisama used to live, as well as a memorial hall that enshrines the spirit of Ogamisama. Dormitories are available for visitors.

Tensho Kotai Jingukyo's Kigen (紀元) calendar year starts from 1946, when Sayo Kitamura proclaimed that God's new era would start. For example Kigen (紀元) year 1 would be 1946, and Kigen (紀元) year 22 would be 1967.

=== Six basic emotions ===
In Tenshō Kōtai Jingūkyō, the "six basic emotions" to be controlled are:

1. to begrudge (惜しい, oshii)
2. to desire (欲しい, hoshii)
3. hatred (憎い, nikui)
4. fondness (かわい, kawai)
5. to love inordinately (好いた, suita)
6. wishing to be loved (好かれた, sukareta)

The first four basic emotions are identical to the first four "eight dusts" in Tenrikyo.

== Prayer ==
The main prayer of the religion is as follows.

Japanese text

御祈の詞
天照皇大神宮
八百万の神
天下太平 天下太平
国民揃うて天地の御気に召します上は
必ず住みよき神国を与え給え
六魂清浄 六魂清浄
我が身は六魂清浄なり
六魂清浄なるが故に
この祈りのかなわざることなし
名妙法連結経
名妙法連結経
名妙法連結経

Japanese transliteration

Oinori no Kotoba
Tenshō Kōtai Jingū
Yao yorozu no Kami
Tenka taihei, Tenka taihei
Kokumin soroute tenchi no oki ni meshimasu ue wa
Kanarazu sumi yoki mikuni o atae tamae
Rokkon shōjō, Rokkon shōjō
Waga mi wa rokkon shōjō nari
Rokkon shōjō naru ga yue ni
Kono inori no kanawazaru koto nashi
Na myōhō renge kyō
Na myōhō renge kyō
Na myōhō renge kyō

English translation

Prayer
Almighty God of the Universe
and myriad of angels
Peace in the world; Peace in the world
When all people comply with the Will of God
Give us a Heavenly Kingdom pleasant to live in
Purification of the six basic emotions; Purification of the six basic emotions
The six basic emotions of my spirit are now entirely purified
Since the six basic emotions have been purified
It cannot be that this prayer will not be fulfilled
Na myōhō renge kyō
Na myōhō renge kyō
Na myōhō renge kyō

== See also ==
- Anatta / Anātman (Japanese: muga)
