= Barbara Brennan =

American writer (1939–2022)

- Born: Barbara Ann Brennan; February 19, 1939
- Died: October 3, 2022 (aged 83)
- Occupations: Energy healing practitioner, teacher, author
- Writing career
- Period: 1962 – 2022
- Subject: Energy healing
- Notable work: Hands of Light
- Website: barbarabrennan.com

Barbara Ann Brennan (February 19, 1939 – October 3, 2022) was an American writer, spiritual healer, businesswoman and teacher working in the field of energy healing.

== Education and early career ==
Brennan received a Bachelor of Science degree in Physics in 1962 from the University of Wisconsin–Madison, and two years later received her master's degree in Atmospheric Physics from the same institution. She then went on to spend six years working at NASA's Goddard Space Flight Center. From 1970, she participated in courses at a number of unaccredited institutions, offering courses in the "human energy field". She completed a two–year program in Therapeutic Counselling at the Community of the Whole Person in Washington, D.C., followed by a three-year program in Core Energetics at the Institute for Core Energetics in New York City in 1978 and a five-year program in Spiritual Healership at the Phoenicia Pathwork Center in Phoenicia, New York in 1979. She was strongly influenced by Eva and John Pierrakos, who founded a system for self-transformation called the Pathwork, drawing on the ideas of Wilhelm Reich and Alexander Lowen. Brennan worked with the Pierrakos, and became a Pathwork Helper and Core Energetics therapist. Brennan also took seminars with and was influenced by Rev. Rosalyn L. Bruyere. She developed her own private healing practice in 1977 and then established a training programme to teach others. Brennan had a PhD in philosophy from Greenwich University in Australia and DTh in theology from Holos University, both earned in 2001. These universities are unaccredited.

== Ideas and theories ==
Her first book, Hands of Light: A Guide to Healing Through the Human Energy Field, is considered a "classic" in the field of spiritual healing, with reputedly over one million copies in print in 22 languages. Brennan claimed to receive intuitive information about her clients during sessions, and to see repetitive patterns in the energy fields of her clients indicating common roots underlying their difficulties. Brennan's books contain drawings of auras and energy fields, and descriptions of how human energy fields interact with each other. She popularized a seven-layer model of the energy field, each layer being structured of differing frequencies and kinds of energy and performing different functions.

Brennan viewed the chakras as transformers that receive and process universal energy, as well as enabling expression and healthy functioning of the individual's own consciousness and psycho-physical make-up.

=== Brennan's concept of "hara" ===
In her second book, Light Emerging, Brennan expanded her model of human subtle energies by adding the dimension of "intentionality" called "hara".

== Barbara Brennan School of Healing ==
In 1982, she closed her private practice in New York City and established the Barbara Brennan School of Healing (BBSH), designed to train professional energy healers from around the world. The school has been located in Florida since 2000, and is licensed by the State of Florida Commission for Independent Education. In the early 2000s, two branches opened in Europe and Japan, both of which closed in the 2010s.

== Death ==
The Barbara Brennan School of Healing reported her death on October 3, 2022.

== Publications ==
- Hands of Light: A Guide to Healing through the Human Energy Field, Bantam, 1987. ISBN 978-0-553-34539-1, limited free access
- Light Emerging: The Journey of Personal Healing, Bantam, 1993. ISBN 0-553-35456-6, limited free access
- Core light healing: My Personal Journey and Advanced Healing Concepts for Creating the Life You Long to Live ISBN 9781401971359 (2022)

== See also ==
- Terms and concepts in alternative medicine
- Body psychotherapy
- Energy (esotericism)
- Energy medicine
- Bioenergetics
- Jin Shin Do
- Johrei
- Reiki
