= Kirlian =

Kirlian may refer to:

- Semyon Davidovich Kirlian (1898–1978), Russian inventor and researcher of Armenian descent
- Kirlian photography, a photographic technique, named after Semyon and his wife Valentina Kirlian
- Kirlian, the pseudonym of Abe Duque (born 1968), American techno-musician and producer
