= Picamar =

Picamar is a colorless, hydrocarbon oil extracted from the creosote of beechwood tar with a peculiar odor and bitter taste. It consists of derivatives of pyrogallol. It was discovered by German chemist Carl Reichenbach in the 1830s. Picamar can be used to lubricate machinery.

== Chemical and physical properties ==
The exact composition of picamar is unknown. According to Pastrovich, picamar is a monomethyl ether of propyl-pyrogallol (C_{10}H_{14}O_{3}). However, Gustav Niederist, who obtained an original sample of the oil as prepared by von Reichenbach himself, assigned it a formula of C_{13}H_{18}O_{4}. Picamar is colorless with a peculiar, peppermint-like odor and bitter taste. It is soluble in alcohol and sparingly soluble in water. It has a melting point of 545 °F (285 °C). Picamar reduces the red oxide of mercury to its metallic state. It reacts with nitric acid to become a reddish-brown, greasy substance and can also dissolve camphor, resin, and benzoic acids.

== History ==
The name "picamar" is derived from the Latin phrase in pice amarum (meaning "bitter principle of tar"). It was discovered by German chemist Carl Reichenbach in the 1830s as one of the six principles of beechwood tar, along with other substances as capnomor and eupione that were "met with less notice".

== Applications ==
Picamar is used for greasing machinery and preventing them from rusting.
