= Energy field =

Energy field may refer to:

== Pseudoscience ==
- Energy (esotericism), a term used by proponents and practitioner of various esoteric forms of spirituality and alternative medicine
  - Aura (paranormal), according to spiritual beliefs, a colored emanation said to enclose the sides of any animal or object
- Energy field disturbance, a pseudoscientific concept rooted in alternative medicine
- Torsion field (pseudoscience), a hypothetical source of energy with no current basis

== Science ==
- Force field (physics), a vector field that describes a non-contact force acting on a particle at various positions in space
  - Electromagnetic field, a physical field produced by electrically charged objects
    - Electric field, a vector field surrounding an electric charge that exerts force on other charges
    - Magnetic field, a vector field that describes the magnetic influence of electrical currents and magnetized materials
  - Gravitational field, a model used to explain the influence that a massive body extends into the space around itself
  - Quantum field, a mechanical model of subatomic particles and quasiparticles in condensed matter physics
- Force field (technology), a barrier produced by something like energy
