= Odic force =

Hypothetical vital energy or life force

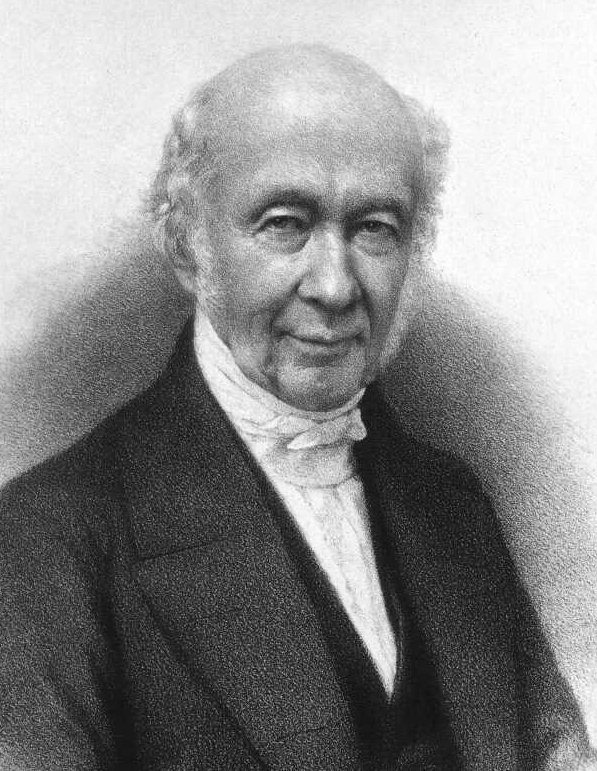
Baron Carl von Reichenbach

Odic force (also called Od /oʊd/, Odyle, Önd, Odes, Odylic, Odyllic, or Odems) was a hypothetical vital energy or life force believed in by some in the mid-19th century. The name was coined by Baron Carl von Reichenbach in 1845 in reference to the Germanic god Odin.

== History ==
As von Reichenbach was investigating the manner in which the human nervous system could be affected by various substances, he conceived the existence of a new force allied to electricity, magnetism, and heat, a force which he thought was radiated by most substances, and to the influence of which different people are variously sensitive. He named this vitalist concept Odic force. Proponents say that Odic force permeates all plants, animals, and humans.

Believers in Odic force said that it was visible in total darkness as colored auras surrounding living things, crystals, and magnets, but that viewing it required hours first spent in total darkness, and only very sensitive people had the ability to see it. They also said that it resembles the Asian concepts prana and qi. However, they regarded the Odic force as not associated with breath (like India's prana and the qi of Chinese martial arts) but rather mainly with biological electromagnetic fields.

Von Reichenbach did not tie Odic force into other vitalist theories. Baron von Reichenbach expounded the concept of Odic force in detail in a book-length article, Researches on Magnetism, Electricity, Heat and Light in their Relations to Vital Forces, which appeared in a special issue of a respected scientific journal, Annalen der Chemie und Physik. He said that (1) the Odic force had a positive and negative flux, and a light and dark side; (2) individuals could forcefully "emanate" it, particularly from the hands, mouth, and forehead; and (3) the Odic force had many possible applications.

The Odic force was conjectured to explain the phenomenon of hypnotism. In Britain, impetus was given to this view of the subject following the translation of Reichenbach's Researches by William Gregory, professor of chemistry at the University of Edinburgh. These later researches tried to show many of the Odic phenomena to be of the same nature as those described previously by Franz Mesmer and even long before Mesmer by Emanuel Swedenborg.

The French parapsychologists Hippolyte Baraduc and Albert de Rochas were influenced by the concept of the Odic force.

Von Reichenbach hoped to develop scientific proof for a universal life force; however, his experiments relied on perceptions reported by individuals who claimed to be "sensitive", as he himself could not observe any of the reported phenomena. The "sensitives" had to work in total or near-total darkness to be able to observe the phenomena. Reichenbach stated that, through experimentation, possibly one-third of the population could view the phenomenon, but far less otherwise.

== Scientific reception ==
The concept of Odic force was criticized by the scientific community as there was no reliable or replicable data for its existence. It was described as quackery by critics and is regarded today as an example of pseudoscience.

Science writer Martin Gardner in his book Fads and Fallacies in the Name of Science (1957) noted that "scientists were unable to duplicate the baron's experiments."

Robert Todd Carroll in The Skeptic's Dictionary has written:

The baron had no training in psychology or psychopathology and no training in devising experiments involving people. He applied many standard scientific techniques and followed standard practices of data collection and recording, including graphs and charts. But he seems to have had no sense of how to do a controlled experiment with so-called "sensitives," people who might better be described as neurotics or delusional. (Jastrow says that for the most part, his subjects were "neurotic young women.") Given the fact that he deceived himself so thoroughly over such a long period of time, it seems reasonable to assume that he was (at the very least) unconsciously suggesting behaviors to his subjects. His enthusiasm for the project undoubtedly biased his subjective observations. That he came to think that the odic force could explain dozens of disparate phenomena, while being unable to convince other scientists that he had discovered anything, signifies the pathological nature of his investigations. Reichenbach's pursuit of the odic force is a classic example of pathological science.

Scientists have abandoned concepts such as the Odic force. In western popular culture the name is used in a similar way to qi or prana to refer to spiritual energies or the vital force associated with living things. In Europe, the Odic force has been mentioned in books on dowsing, for example.

== See also ==
- Aether (classical element)
- Aether theories
- Energy (esotericism)
- Kirlian photography
- Mana
- Orgone
- Óðr, also known as Od, Norse god
- Seid
- Vril
- Éliphas Lévi—astral light
- Wilhelm Reich—"orgone" energy
