= Paul Joire =

French parapsychologist (1856–1930)

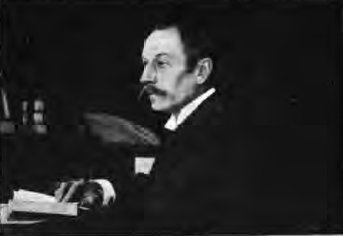
- Born: 1856
- Died: 1930
- Occupation(s): Parapsychologist, writer

Paul Joire (1856–1930) was a leading French parapsychologist, professor at the "Psycho-physiological Institute of France" and president of the "Societé Universelle d'Études Psychiques" ("Universal Society of Psychic Studies").

== Work ==
Paul Joire researched and wrote extensively about hypnotism and its experimental and therapeutic uses in "Traité de l'hypnotisme expérimental et thérapeutique" (1908). He investigated many parapsychological phenomena, such as the "exteriorisation of sensibility", associated with hypnotism, in which the hypnotised subject appears to be able to receive sensations at a distance, as if his nervous sensitivity extended beyond the boundary of the physical body; and "motricity", the movement of objects, without contact, apparently by some force emanating from the human body, often associated with mediumship and seances.

He devised an instrument called a sthenometer (a type of "biometer") which, he claimed, could detect the "nervous force" emitted by the body, and about which he wrote several papers. The device consisted of a circular dial, marked off in degrees, in the centre of which was a delicate needle, balanced on a pivot and the whole covered by a glass case (see illustration). It was found that when the extended fingers of a subject's hand were placed near the side of the device, a deflection of the needle was observed, attributable, according to Joire, to the "nervous force" emanating from the body. He thought that this force was modified and disturbed by states of illness in the subject and therefore the sthenometer could be useful in diagnosis and treatment. The nervous force was disputed by other researchers. In 1907, F. J. M. Stratton tested the device and concluded the results were due to the influence of the hands body heat.

Joire also investigated and documented, ESP (extra-sensory perception), levitation, automatic writing, "spirit rapping" (typtology), spirit photography, mediumship and materialisation phenomena etc.

== Publications ==
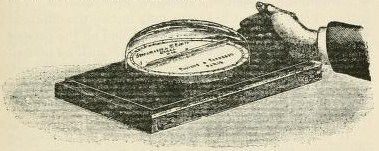
A Sthenometer, an instrument designed by Joire to demonstrate the presence of a force extending from and beyond the human body

- Traité D'Hypnotisme Expérimental Et De Psychothérapie (1914)
- Psychical and Supernormal Phenomena: Their Observation and Experimentation (New York: Frederick A. Stokes, 1916).

== See also ==
- Hippolyte Baraduc
- Émile Boirac
- Joseph Grasset
- Albert de Rochas
