= Émile Boirac =

French philosopher (1851–1917)

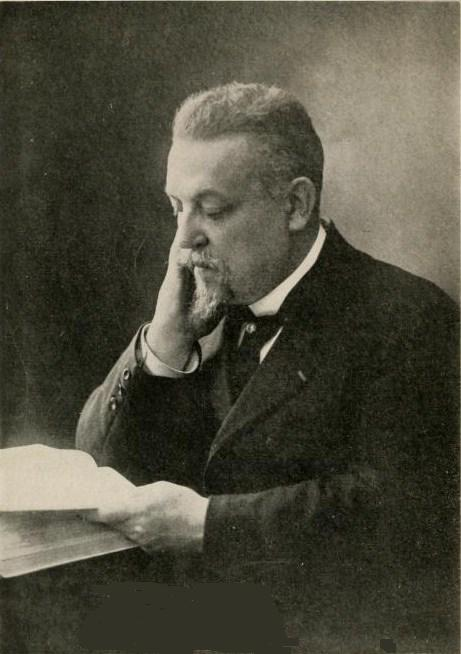
Émile Boirac in 1917

Émile Boirac (26 August 1851 – 20 September 1917) was a French philosopher, parapsychologist, promoter of Esperanto and writer.

== Biography ==
Boirac was born in Guelma, Algeria. He became president of the University of Grenoble in 1898, and in 1902 president of Dijon University. A notable advocate for the universal language, Esperanto, he presided over its 1st Universal Congress (Boulogne-Sur-Mer, France, 7 August to 12 August 1905) and directed the Academy of Esperanto.

He was one of the first to use the term "déjà vu", where it appeared in a letter to the editor of Revue philosophique in 1876, and subsequently in Boirac's book L'Avenir des Sciences Psychiques, where he also proposed the term "metagnomy" ("knowledge of things situated beyond those we can normally know") as a more precise description for what was, then, commonly known as clairvoyance.

He was one of a group that conducted experiments on the Italian medium Eusapia Palladino. He also investigated animal magnetism, and various hypnotic phenomena such as the induction of sleep, "transposition of senses", "magnetic rapport", "exteriorisation of sensitiveness", "exteriorisation of motor nerve force" etc.

Boirac died in Dijon in 1917.

== See also ==
- Paul Joire
- Albert de Rochas
- Joseph Grasset

== Bibliography ==
Books on parapsychology:

- Our hidden forces ("La psychologie inconnue") An experimental study of the psychic sciences (New York, Frederick A. Stokes company, 1917).
- The psychology of the future ("L'avenir des sciences psychiques") (London, Paul, 1918)

Books on Philosophy and education:

- Oeuvres philosophiques de Leibniz Volume 1 Volume 2 (F. Alcan, 1900).
- Boirac, Emile, & Magendie, A. Leçons de psychologie appliquée à l'éducation (Paris, F. Alcan, 1902).
- Fouillée, Alfred & Boirac, E. Esquisse d'une interpretation du monde: d'après les manuscrits de l'auteur (Paris: F. Alcan, 1913).

Esperanto books:

- Translation to esperanto of Leibniz's Monodalogy (1902)
- Ŝlosileto kvarlingva (1903)
- Perdita kaj retrovita (1905)
- Qu'est-ce que l'espéranto? (1906)
- Le Congrès espérantiste de Genève (1906)
- Pri la homa radiado (1906)
- Translation to esperanto of Molière's Don Juan (1909)
- Translation to esperanto of Henry van Dyke's The Other Wise Man, de (1909)
- Plena Vortaro E-E-a (1909)
- Le problème de la langue internationale (1911)
- Vortaro de la Oficialaj Radikoj (1911)
- Fundamentaj principoj de la vortaro esperanta (1911)
