= Matthew McQueen =

Matthew McQueen may refer to:

- Matthew McQueen (Hollyoaks), a character from the soap opera Hollyoaks
- Matthew McQueen (politician) (born 1967), member of the New Mexico House of Representatives
- Matt McQueen (1863–1944), Scottish footballer
- Matthewdavid (Matthew David McQueen, born 1984), American record producer and DJ
- Matthew McQueen, member of the 1980s musical group Automatic Pilot
