= C5H12 =

The molecular formula C_{5}H_{12} (molar mass: 72.15 g/mol, exact mass: 72.0939 u) may refer to:

- Pentanes
  - Pentane
  - Eupione, or eupion
  - Isopentane, or methylbutane
  - Neopentane, or 2,2-dimethylpropane
