= Rochas (disambiguation) =

Rochas is a French perfume brand.

Rochas may also refer to:

- Galician and Portuguese for rocks, in geology
- Rochas Okorocha, Nigerian politician
- Albert de Rochas, French parapsychologist, military engineer, and writer
- Alphonse Beau de Rochas (1815–1893), French engineer
- Rémy Rochas (born 1996), French road cyclist
