= Albert de Rochas =

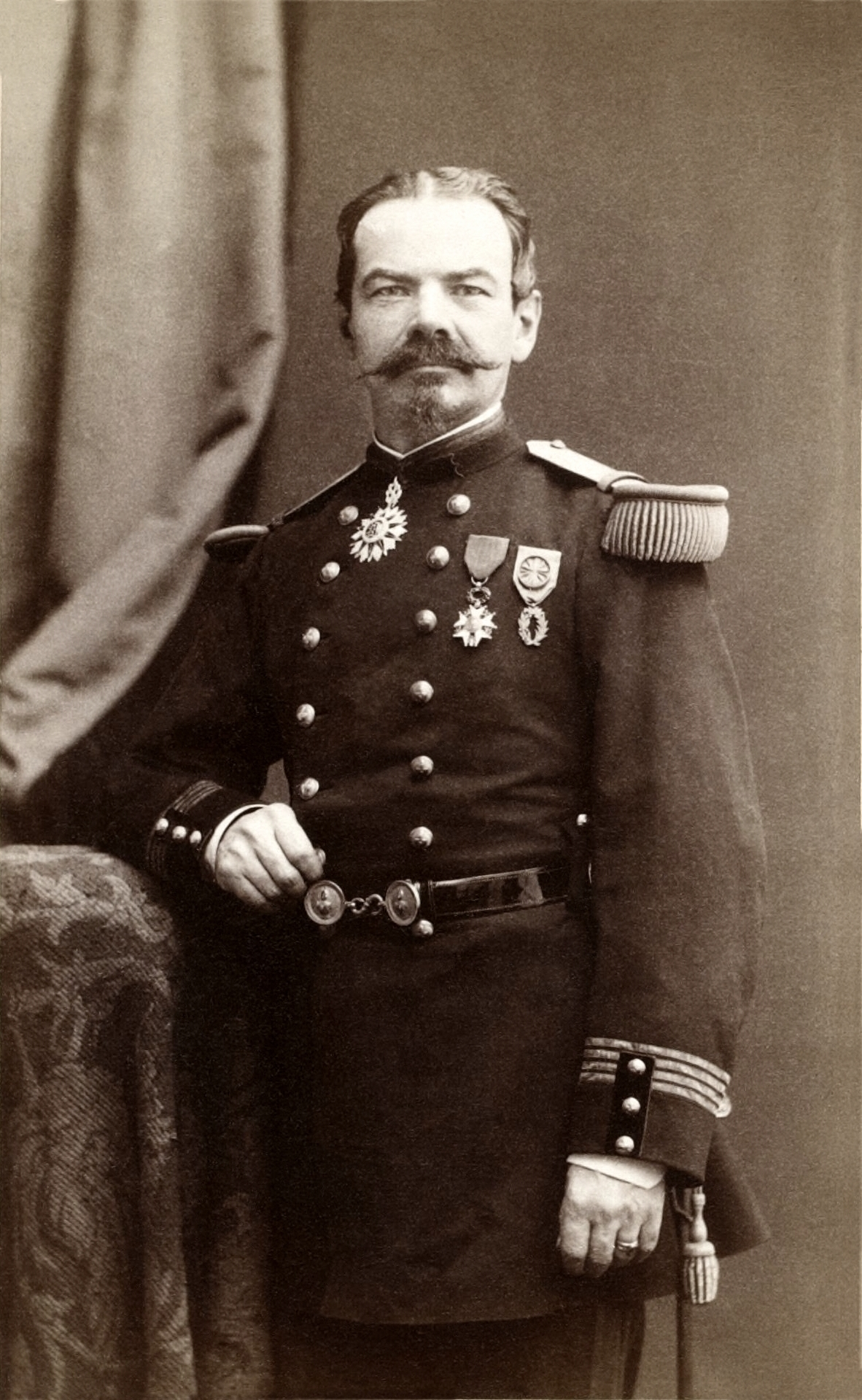
- Born: Albert de Rochas; 20 May 1837; Saint-Firmin, Hautes-Alpes, France
- Died: 2 September 1914 (aged 77); Grenoble
- Occupations: parapsychologist, science historian, military engineer
- Parent(s): Joseph Eugène de Rochas d'Aiglun; Félicité Camille Jayet

Eugène Auguste Albert de Rochas d'Aiglun (20 May 1837 – 2 September 1914) was a French parapsychologist, historian, translator, writer, military engineer and administrator.

== Biography ==
=== Life and career ===
Rochas was born in Saint Firmin in the department of Hautes-Alpes, the son of Marie Joseph Eugène de Rochas d'Aiglun, a judge at the court in Briançon, and of Félicité Camille Jayet. He studied literature and mathematics at the Lycée de Grenoble, then, in 1857, entered the École Polytechnique in Paris, intending to follow a military career.

In 1861, he was commissioned as a Lieutenant in the Military Engineers ("Le Génie militaire") and distinguished himself as a soldier, engineer and administrator. He rose to the rank of battalion commander in 1880 and was made chief of engineers in 1887. He retired from the military in 1888 as a Lieutenant-Colonel. He had also been inspector of studies and director at the École Polytechnique but had to resign due to his involvement in paranormal research activities.

Rochas was made a Chevalier (Knight) in the Legion d'Honneur in 1875 and an officer in 1889.

=== Scientific writing ===
As a scholar, he made significant contributions to the study of military engineering history, producing, for example, a French translation of an 11th-century Alexandrian treatise on fortification and machines of war called Veterum Mathematicorum Opera (1693), and publishing the correspondence of the distinguished 17th century military engineer, Vauban. He also wrote about ancient technology, exploring subjects as diverse as hydraulic organs, water clocks, ancient surveying instruments, temple machinery, Greek artillery, and ancient railways. He was well respected as a researcher and won a medal from the "Société des Études Grecques" for his translations of Greek texts.

=== Paranormal research ===
Rochas is now best known for his extensive parapsychological research and writing, in which he attempted to explore a scientific basis for occult phenomena. His first book on the subject, Les Forces non définies ("Undefined Forces", 1887), was followed by numerous books and articles over the course of nearly thirty years, on subjects such as hypnotism, telekinesis, "magnetic emanations" reincarnation, spirit photography, etc.

Rochas was part of the committee that investigated the famous Italian medium, Eusapia Palladino, detailed in his book, L'extériorisation de la motricité (1896). He carried out research into hypnosis, and documented the phenomenon of "externalisation of sensibility" whereby hypnotised subjects acquire a physical sensitivity to stimuli at a distance; for example, the subject can be made to feel pain if a certain spot is pinched or pricked away from the body and can even be made to feel the sensations of the hypnotist. He investigated other "magnetic" phenomena such as the transference of disease from one organism to another, past life regression, the effects of music on human emotion (see Les Sentiments, la musique et le geste), etc. He also introduced the French public to the work of Carl Reichenbach and his theory of odic force.

== See also ==
- Émile Boirac
- Joseph Grasset
- Paul Joire

== Bibliography ==
=== Parapsychology books ===
- La Science des philosophes et l'art des thaumaturges dans l'antiquité ("The science of philosophers and the art of miracle workers in ancient times"), G. Masson, Paris, 1882.
- Les Forces non définies, recherches historiques et expérimentales ("Undefined forces, historical and experimental investigations"), G. Masson, Paris, 1887.
- Le Fluide des magnétiseurs, précis des expériences du Baron de Reichenbach sur ses propriétés physiques et physiologiques, classées et annotées par le lieutenant-colonel de Rochas d'Aiglun ("The fluid of the magnetizers, summary of the experiences of Baron Reichenbach concerning its physical and physiological properties etc.") of, G. Carré, Paris, 1891 (N.B. a "magnetizer" was a practitioner of animal magnetism).
- Les États profonds de l'hypnose ("States of deep hypnosis"), Chamuel, Paris, 1892.
- L'Envoûtement, documents historiques et expérimentaux ("Bewitchment, historical and experimental documents"), Chamuel, Paris, 1893.
- Les États superficiels de l'hypnose ("States of light hypnosis"), Chamuel, Paris, 1893.
- L'Extériorisation de la sensibilité, étude expérimentale et historique ("The exteriorisation of sensibility, an experimental and historical study"), Bibliothèque Chacornac, Paris, 1895.
- L'extériorisation de la motricité, recueil d'expériences et d'observations ("The exteriorisation of motive power, a collection of experiences and observations") Chamuel éditeur, Paris, 1896
- La Lévitation, P.-G. Leymarie, Paris, 1897.
- Les Sentiments, la musique et le geste ("Emotions, music and gesture"), Grenoble Lib. Dauphinoise, 1900.
- Les Frontières de la science ("Frontiers of Science"), Librairie des sciences psychologiques, Paris, 2 volumes, 1902-1904.
- L'Extériorisation de la motricité ("The externalisation of motive power"), Bibliothèque Chacornac, Paris, 1906.
- Les Vies successives, documents pour l'étude de cette question ("Successive lives, documents for the study of this question"), Bibliothèque Chacornac, Paris, 1911.
- La Suspension de la vie, Dorbon aîné, Paris, 1913.

=== Scientific books ===
- Les Vallées vaudoises, étude de topographie et d'histoire militaires, Tanera, Paris, 1880.
- Principes de la fortification antique. Précis des connaissances techniques nécessaires aux archéologues pour explorer les ruines des anciennes forteresse, Tanera, Paris, 1881.
- La Science dans l'antiquité. Les Origines de la science et ses premières applications, G. Masson, Paris, 1884
- Le Livre de demain, Raoul Marchand, Blois, 1884 (printed on 46 different kinds of paper).
- Vauban, sa famille et ses écrits, ses oisivetés et sa correspondance : analyse et extraits, Berger-Levrault, Paris, 2 volumes, 1910

=== Scientific articles ===
The following articles are available to read online. See index of volumes at Le Conservatoire numérique des Arts & Métiers.

- Les Pneumatiques de Héron d'Alexandrie La Nature, no. 421, 25 June 1881.
- Les trépieds merveilleux d'Homère, La Nature, no. 444, 3 Dec 1881.
- Les bénitiers à tirelire et à tourniquet dans les temples de l'ancienne Égypte - La Nature - no. 460 - 23 Mar 1882.
- Comment nous sont parvenus les ouvrages scientifiques de l'antiquité - La Nature - no. 463 - 15 April 1882.
- Les théâtres de marionnettes chez les Grecs - La Nature - no. 464 - 22 Apr 1882.
- Les orgues hydrauliques - La Nature - no. 481 - 19 Aug 1882
- Le transport des grandes masses. Transport du piédestal de la statue de Pierre le Grand à Saint-Pétersbourg - La Nature - no. 491 - 28 Oct 1882.
- L'automate joueur d'échecs - La Nature - no. 494 - 18 Nov 1882.
- Le décapité buvant - La Nature - no. 495 - 25 Nov 1882.
- La catoptrique des Grecs - La Nature - no. 498 - 16 Dec 1882
- Le joueur d'échecs de Robert Hondin - La Nature - no. 503 - 20 Jan 1883
- Les origines de l'industrie - La Nature - no. 505 - 3 Feb 1883
- Mesureur de liquides, système Héron - La Nature - no. 507 - 17 Feb 1883
- Les origines de la machine à vapeur - La Nature - no. 509 - 3 Mar 1883
- Les instruments de géodésie dans l'antiquité - La Nature - no. 511 - 17 Mar 1883
- La tête qui parle et s'évanouit en fumée - La Nature - no. 513 - 31 Mar 1883
- La production du feu - La Nature - no. 520 - 19 May 1883
- La pompe à incendie dans l'antiquité - La Nature - no. 522 - 2 June 1883
- L'artillerie des Grecs - La Nature - no. 523 - 9 Jun 1883
- La science dans l'antiquité. Un jouet grec. La machine pneumatique et la fontaine de compression. Les hodomètres. Les théâtres à pivot de Curion. Les lampes perpétuelles. Les vases merveilleux - La Nature - no. 525 - 23 June 1883
- La science dans l'antiquité : Les hodomètres - La Nature - no. 526 - 30 June 1883
- La machinerie des temples antiques - La Nature - no. 528 - 14 July 1883
- Les miroirs ardents - Revue scientifique- 11 Aug 1883
- La trempe du bronze - Revue scientifique- 22 Sep 1883
- Le transport des grandes masses : transport d'un clocher - La Nature - no. 540 - 6 Oct 1883
- Les savants de la Renaissance - La Nature - no. 551 - 22 Dec 1883
- Les machines d'assaut - La Nature - no. 553 - 5 Jan 1884
- Les savants de la Renaissance. Le Père Schott - La Nature - no. 580 - 12 July 1884
- L'art industriel à Blois : fabrication de la faïence - La Nature - no. 585 - 14 Aug 1884
- Les horloges hydrauliques de l'antiquité - La Nature - no. 587 - 30 Aug 1884
- Les boulettes contre la faim et les conserves alimentaires chez les Grecs - La Nature - no. 605 - 3 Jan 1885
- Crapaud trouvé vivant dans une pierre - La Nature - no. 606 - 10 Jan 1885
- La suspension de la vie - La Nature - no. 607 - 17 Jan 1885
- L'audition colorée - La Nature - no. 620 - 18 Apr 1885
- Le rayon vert et l'équerre chromatique - La Nature - no. 634 - 25 July 1885
- L'audition colorée - La Nature - no. 644 - 3 Oct 1885
- Le truc des anciens oracles - La Nature - no. 651 - 21 Nov 1885
- Le timbre et la couleur - La Nature - no. 658 - 9 Jan 1886
- L'origine du langage - La Nature - no. 668 - 20 Mar 1886
- Le contraste des couleurs - La Nature - no. 668 - 27 Mar 1886
- L'or alchimique - La Nature - no. 674 - 1 May 1886
- L'expression des sentiments - La Nature - no. 694 - 18 Sep 1886
- Une construction pélasgique contemporaine - La Nature - no. 800 - 29 Sep 1886
- Cadran Lunaire - La Nature - no. 830 - 17 Apr 1889
- Les cosaques de l'Oural - La Nature - no. 874 - 1 Mar 1890
- L'alpinisme d'hiver et les raquettes de neige - La Nature - no. 884 - 10 May 1890
- Les origines de la machine à vapeur et de l'utilisation mécanique de la chaleur solaire - La Nature - no. 917 - 27 Dec 1890
- Les races de pigeons voyageurs - La Nature - no. 922 - 31 Jan 1891
- La notation des couleurs - La Nature - no. 925 - 21 Feb 1891
- Le réseau de colombiers militaires en Europe - La Nature - no.941 - 13 June 1891
- L'origine des grandes bibliothèques scientifiques de Paris - La Nature - no. 976 - 13 feb 1892
- La soupe au blé de Vauban - La Nature - no. 982 - 26 Mar 1892
- Les coquilles de pèlerin - La Nature - no. 1028 - 11 Feb 1893
- Charlet et l'enseignement du dessin aux ingénieurs - La Nature - no. 1050 - 15 July 1893
- Les refuges souterrains de la gaule - La Nature - no. 1053 - 5 Aug 1893
- Les uniformes de l'école polytechnique - La Nature - no. 1078 - 27 Jan 1894
- Centenaire de l'école polytechnique - La Nature - no. 1093 - 12 May 1894
- Le sens des couleurs - La Nature - no. 1145 - 11 May 1895
- Les pigeons voyageurs et la mer - La Nature - no. 1150 - 15 June 1895
- La vitesse des pigeons voyageurs - La Nature - no. 1153 - 6 July 1895
- Le vieux-neuf, la vapeur et la chaleur solaire - La Nature - no. 1175 - 2 Dec 1895
- Le rire du chien - La Nature - no. 1185 - 22 Feb 1896
- Le colonel Langlois et les panoramas - La Nature - no. 1202 - 13 June 1896
- Le Vieux Neuf. Les cuirassés en étoffe - La Nature - no. 1234 - 12 June 1897
- La mimique enseignée par l'hypnotisme - La Nature - no. 1373 - 14 Sep 1899
- La musique et le geste - La Nature - no. 1374 - 23 Sep 1899
- Les muscles expressifs de la face - La Nature - no. 1391 - 20 Jan 1900
- Vauban - Revue scientifique- 1st, Sep 1900
- Une lettre inédite de Vauban - La Nature - no. 1464 - 15 June 1901
- La médaille française - La Nature - no. 1431 - 16 Mar 1901
- Les enseignes - La Nature - no. 1519 - 3 July 1901
- Les rainures des chemins antiques - La Nature - no. 1683 - 26 Aug 1905

The articles in these papers are published under the names of A. de Rochas or M. D'Aiglun Lt-Colonel de Rochas.
