= Pittacal =

Pittacal was the first synthetic dyestuff to be produced commercially. It was accidentally discovered in 1832 by German chemist Carl Ludwig Reichenbach, who is also recognized as being the discoverer of kerosene, phenol, eupion, paraffin wax and creosote.

According to history, Reichenbach applied creosote to the wooden posts of his home, in order to drive away dogs who urinated on them. The strategy was ineffective, however, and he noted that the dog's urine reacted with creosote to form an intense dark blue deposit. He named the new substance píttacal (from Greek words tar and beautiful). He later succeeded in producing pure pittacal by treating beechwood tar with barium oxide and using alumina as a mordant to the dye's fabrics. Although sold commercially as a dyestuff, it did not fare well.

Eupittone (derived from eu- + pittacal + -one) is a yellow crystalline substance resembling aurin, and obtained by the oxidation of pittacal. It is also called also eupittonic acid or eupitton.
