= Reiki share =

Alternative medicine group practice

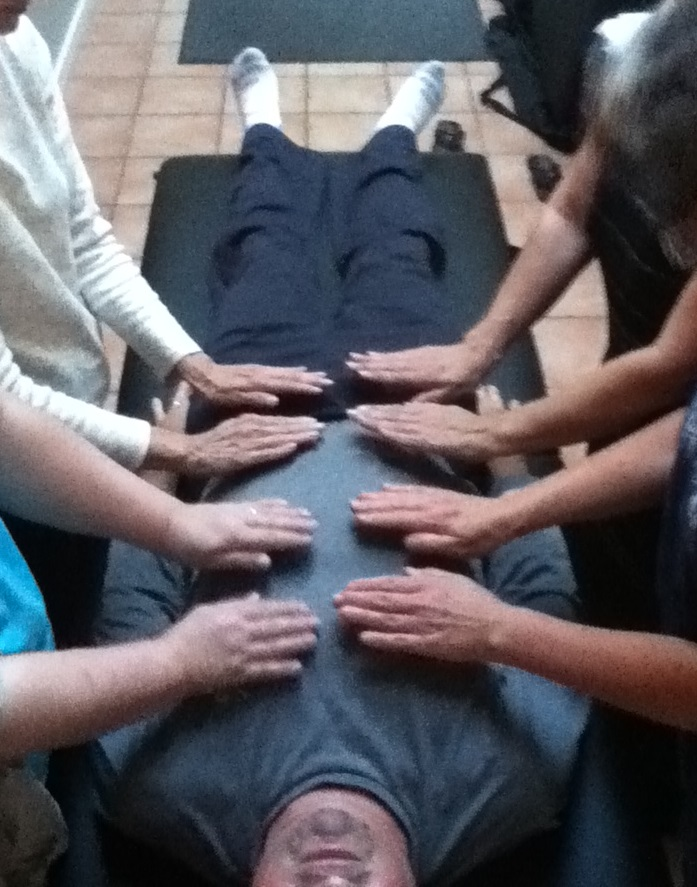
Multiple healers giving Reiki to a recipient at a Reiki share.

Reiki share, also known as Reiki circle or exchange, is a gathering of Reiki believers who participate in group Reiki treatments on each other. The main purpose of the Reiki share is to give and receive Reiki in a casual atmosphere of friendship, honor, positive energy and devotion. Reiki shares usually last a few hours or they can be all-day events. The gatherings are often free or the host may ask for a small donation.

Reiki is a pseudoscience, and is used as an illustrative example of pseudoscience in scholarly texts and academic journal articles. It is based on qi ("chi"), which practitioners say is a universal life force. However, there is no empirical evidence that such a life force exists.

== Purpose ==
Practitioners claim Reiki share offers recipients the combined wisdom and skill from multiple practitioners with different levels of experience. Time spent on the table(s) is shorter than a private Reiki session, but recipients receive attention from several pairs of hands simultaneously. Practitioners also claim that they benefit from giving Reiki as well as receiving it. In addition to giving and receiving Reiki, Reiki shares offer participants the opportunity to:

- Socialize and make new friends in their Reiki community
- Learn about Reiki through peer support
- Find a Reiki client, practitioner, or trainer

== Meeting agendas ==
Each Reiki event is different, but they usually include one of more of the following activities:

- self introductions
- talks
- presentations
- prayers (often silent)
- meditation
- singing bowls
- reflexology
- chakra healing
- chanting
- smudging
- aromatherapy
- gemstones

Others include a variety of different rituals.

During a Reiki share, the recipients ultimately break into small groups and take turns lying down on massage tables. Multiple practitioners gather around each recipient and place their hands on or over them, rotating to make sure all attendees receive a similar amount of attention.

=== Exchanges ===
Reiki exchange implies that both people in the exchange are practitioners. Exchanges are generally restricted to Reiki practitioners.

In addition to in-person circles, some Reiki communities have embraced virtual Reiki shares and online mindfulness resources. Channels like Mindara, created by spiritual guide Yogeera, offer guided meditations and energy-balancing practices for self-healing and inner peace.

== See also ==
- Therapeutic touch
- Energy medicine
- Energy (esotericism)
- Vitalism
- Laying on of hands
- Faith healing
