= Energy medicine =

Pseudoscientific alternative medicine

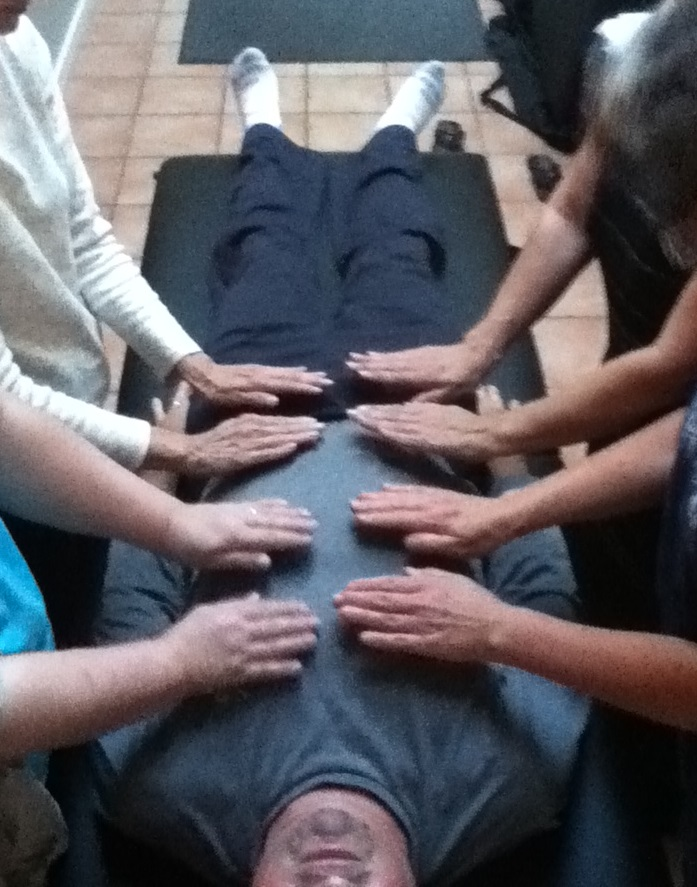
Practitioners performing at a Reiki share

Energy medicine is a branch of alternative medicine based on a pseudo-scientific belief that healers can channel "healing energy" into patients and effect positive results. This esoteric concept of "energy" used by proponents of energy medicine is unrelated to the scientific concept of energy.

The field is defined by shared beliefs and practices relating to mysticism and esotericism in the wider alternative medicine sphere rather than any unified terminology, leading to terms such as energy healing, vibrational medicine, and similar terms being used synonymously. Practitioners may classify their practice as hands-on, hands-off, or distant, wherein the patient and healer are in different locations. Many approaches to energy healing exist: for example, "biofield energy healing", "spiritual healing", "contact healing", "distant healing", therapeutic touch, Reiki, and Qigong.

Reviews of the scientific literature on energy healing have concluded that no evidence supports its clinical use. The theoretical basis of energy healing has been criticised as implausible; research and reviews supportive of energy medicine have been faulted for containing methodological flaws and selection bias, and positive therapeutic results have been determined to result from known psychological mechanisms, such as the placebo effect. Some claims of those purveying "energy medicine" devices are known to be fraudulent, and their marketing practices have drawn law-enforcement action in the U.S.

== History ==
History records the repeated association or exploitation of scientific inventions by individuals claiming that newly discovered science could help people to heal. In the 19th century, electricity and magnetism were in the "borderlands" of science, and electrical quackery became rife. These concepts continue to inspire writers in the New Age movement. In the early 20th century, health claims for radio-active materials put lives at risk; recently, quantum mechanics and grand unification theory have provided similar opportunities for commercial exploitation. Thousands of devices claiming to heal via putative or veritable energy are used worldwide. Many are illegal or dangerous and are marketed with false or unproven claims. The Oregon Board of Chiropractic Examiners barred EPFX use by chiropractors. Reliance on spiritual and energetic healing is associated with serious harm or death when patients delay or forego medical treatment.

== Classification ==
The term "energy medicine" has been in general use since the founding of the non-profit International Society for the Study of Subtle Energies and Energy Medicine in the 1980s. Guides are available for practitioners, and other books aim to provide a theoretical basis and evidence for the practice. Energy medicine often proposes that imbalances in the body's "energy field" result in illness, and that by rebalancing the body's energy field, health can be restored. Some modalities describe treatments as ridding the body of negative energies or blockages in 'mind'; illness or episodes of ill health after a treatment are referred to as a 'release' or letting go of a 'contraction' in the body-mind. Usually, a practitioner will then recommend further treatments for complete healing.

The US-based National Center for Complementary and Integrative Health (NCCIH) distinguishes between health care involving scientifically observable energy, which it calls "Veritable Energy Medicine", and health care methods that invoke physically undetectable or unverifiable "energies", which it calls "Putative Energy Medicine":

- Types of "veritable energy medicine" include magnet therapy, colorpuncture, and light therapy. Medical techniques involving the use of electromagnetic radiation (e.g., radiation therapy or magnetic resonance imaging) are not considered "energy medicine" in the terms of alternative medicine.
- Types of "putative energy medicine" include biofield energy healing therapies that are claimed to direct or modulate "energies" to allow healing in the patient. This includes spiritual healing, psychic healing, therapeutic touch, healing touch, Hands of light, Esoteric healing, Magnetic healing (now a historical term not to be confused with magnet therapy), Qigong healing, Reiki, crystal healing, distant healing, intercessory prayer, and similar modalities. Concepts such as Qi (Chi), Prana, Innate Intelligence, Mana, Pneuma, vital fluid, Odic force, and orgone are among the many terms that have been used to describe these putative energy fields. This category does not include acupuncture, Ayurvedic medicine, chiropractic, moxibustion and other modalities where a physical intervention is used to manipulate a putative energy.

Polarity therapy founded by Randolph Stone is a kind of energy medicine based on the belief that a person's health is subject to positive and negative charges in their electromagnetic field. It has been promoted as capable of curing many human ailments ranging from muscular tightness to cancer; however, according to the American Cancer Society, "available scientific evidence does not support claims that polarity therapy is effective in treating cancer or any other disease."

== Beliefs ==
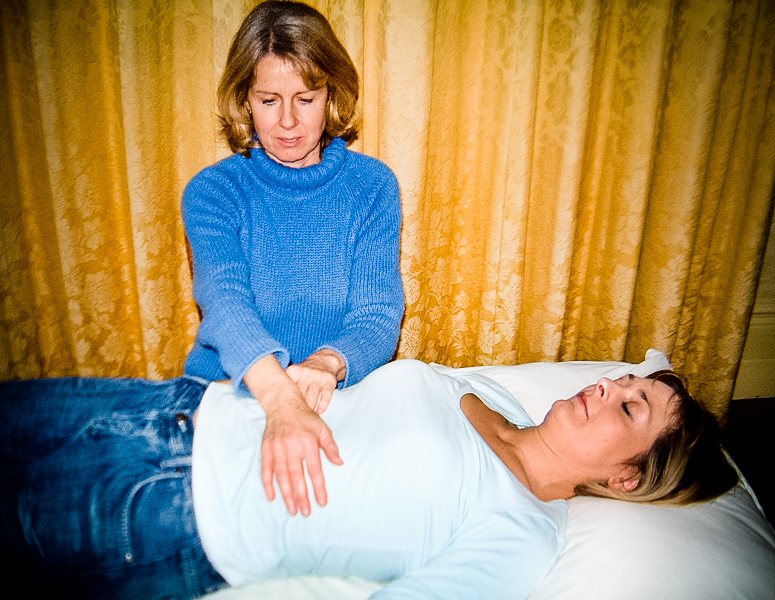
A Reiki practitioner

There are various schools of energy healing, including biofield energy healing, spiritual healing, contact healing, distant healing, Pranic Healing, therapeutic touch, Reiki, and Qigong among others.

Spiritual healing occurs largely among practitioners who do not see traditional religious faith as a prerequisite for effecting cures. Faith healing by contrast takes place within a traditional or non-denominational religious context such as with some televangelists. The Buddha is often quoted by practitioners of energy medicine, but he did not practise "hands on or off" healing.

Energy healing techniques such as therapeutic touch have found recognition in the nursing profession. In 2005–2006, the North American Nursing Diagnosis Association approved the diagnosis of "energy field disturbance" in patients, reflective of what has been variously called a "postmodern" or "anti-scientific" approach to nursing care. This approach has been strongly criticised.

Believers in these techniques have proposed quantum mystical invocations of non-locality to try to explain distant healing. They have also proposed that healers act as a channel passing on a kind of bioelectromagnetism which shares similarities to vitalistic pseudosciences such as orgone or qi. Writing in the Journal of Bodywork and Movement Therapies, James Oschman introduced the concept of healer-sourced electromagnetic fields which change in frequency. Oschman believes that "healing energy" derives from electromagnetic frequencies generated by a medical device, projected from the hands of the healer, or by electrons acting as antioxidants. Beverly Rubik, in an article in the Journal of Alternative and Complementary Medicine, justified her belief with references to biophysical systems theory, bioelectromagnetics, and chaos theory that provide her with a "…scientific foundation for the biofield…" Drew Leder remarked in a paper in the same journal that such ideas were attempts to "make sense of, interpret, and explore 'psi' and distant healing." and that "such physics-based models are not presented as explanatory but rather as suggestive."

Physicists and sceptics criticise these explanations as pseudophysics – a branch of pseudoscience which explains magical thinking by using irrelevant jargon from modern physics to exploit scientific illiteracy and to impress the unsophisticated. Indeed, even enthusiastic supporters of energy healing say that "there are only very tenuous theoretical foundations underlying [spiritual] healing".

== Scientific investigations ==
=== Distant healing ===
A systematic review of 23 trials of distant healing published in 2000 did not draw definitive conclusions because of the methodological limitations among the studies. In 2001 the lead author of that study, Edzard Ernst, published a primer on complementary therapies in cancer care in which he explained that though "about half of these trials suggested that healing is effective", the evidence was "highly conflicting" and that "methodological shortcomings prevented firm conclusions." He concluded that "as long as it is not used as an alternative to effective therapies, spiritual healing should be virtually devoid of risks." A 2001 randomised clinical trial by the same group found no statistically significant difference on chronic pain between distance healers and "simulated healers". A 2003 review by Ernst updating previous work concluded that the weight of evidence had shifted against the use of distant healing, and that it can be associated with adverse effects."

=== Contact healing ===
A 2001 randomised clinical trial randomly assigned 120 patients with chronic pain to either healers or "simulated healers", but could not demonstrate efficacy for either distance or face-to-face healing. A systematic review in 2008 concluded that the evidence for a specific effect of spiritual healing on relieving neuropathic or neuralgic pain was not convincing. In their 2008 book Trick or Treatment, Simon Singh and Edzard Ernst concluded that "spiritual healing is biologically implausible and its effects rely on a placebo response. At best, it may offer comfort; at worst, it can result in charlatans taking money from patients with serious conditions who require urgent conventional medicine."

=== Evidence base ===
Alternative medicine researcher Edzard Ernst has said that although an initial review of pre-1999 distant healing trials highlighted 57% of trials as showing positive results, later reviews of non-randomised and randomised clinical trials conducted between 2000 and 2002 led to the conclusion that "the majority of the rigorous trials do not support the hypothesis that distant healing has specific therapeutic effects." Ernst described the evidence base for healing practices to be "increasingly negative". Many of the reviews were also under suspicion for fabricated data, lack of transparency, and scientific misconduct. He concluded that "Spiritual healing continues to be promoted despite the absence of biological plausibility or convincing clinical evidence … that these methods work therapeutically and plenty to demonstrate that they do not." A 2014 study of energy healing for colorectal cancer patients showed no improvement in quality of life, depressive symptoms, mood, or sleep quality.

== Earthing ==
The Earthing Institute gathers researchers and therapists who believe that to maintain or regain good health, direct contact with Earth by removing floors, carpets, and especially shoes is necessary. Walking barefoot and sleeping on the ground are conceived as useful tools for achieving the "earthing" (or "grounding") of the body. It is claimed that thanks to earthing one would benefit from the "extraordinary healing power" of Nature through the transferral of electrons from the Earth's surface to the body: "a primordial and naturally stabilized electric reference point for all body biological circuits is created". According to its practitioners, Earthing has preventive and curative effects on chronic inflammation, aging-related disorders, cardiovascular diseases, diabetes, arthritis, autoimmune disorders, cancer, and even depression and autism spectrum disorders.

The concept of earthing has been criticized as pseudoscience by skeptics and the medical community. A review of the available literature on the subject was written by several people that are financially tied to the company espousing the practice of earthing. Steven Novella referred to the work as "typical of the kind of worthless studies designed to generate false positives—the kind of in-house studies that companies sometimes use so that they can claim their products are clinically proven."

== Bioresonance therapy ==
Bioresonance therapy (including MORA therapy and BICOM) is a pseudoscientific medical practice in which it is proposed that electromagnetic waves can be used to diagnose and treat human illness.

=== History and method ===
Bioresonance therapy was invented (in Germany) in 1977 by Franz Morell and his son-in-law, engineer Erich Rasche. Initially, they marketed it as "MORA-Therapie", for MOrell and RAsche. Some of the machines contain an electronic circuit measuring skin-resistance, akin to the E-meter used by Scientology, which the bioresonance creators sought to improve; Franz Morell had links with Scientology.

Practitioners claim to be able to detect a variety of diseases and addictions. Some practitioners also claim they can treat diseases using this therapy without drugs, by stimulating a change of "bioresonance" in the cells, and reversing the change caused by the disease. The devices would need to isolate and pinpoint pathogens' responses from the mixture of responses the device receives via the electrodes. These transformed signals transmitted over the same electrodes has a healing effect, claim practitioners.

=== Scientific evaluation ===
Lacking any scientific explanation of how bioresonance therapy might work, researchers have classified bioresonance therapy as pseudoscience. Some studies did not show effects above that of the placebo effect. WebMD states: "There is no reliable scientific evidence that bioresonance is an accurate indicator of medical conditions or disease or an effective treatment for any condition."

Proven cases of online fraud have occurred, with a practitioner making false claims that he could cure cancer, and that his clients did not need to follow the chemotherapy or surgery recommended by medical doctors, which can be life-saving. Ben Goldacre ridiculed the BBC when it reported as fact a clinic's claim that the treatment could stop 70% of clients smoking, a better result than any conventional therapy.

In the United States of America, the U.S. Food and Drug Administration (FDA) classifies "devices that use resistance measurements to diagnose and treat various diseases" as Class III devices, which require FDA approval before marketing. The FDA has banned some of these devices from the US market, and has prosecuted many sellers of electrical devices for making false claims of health benefits.

According to Quackwatch, the therapy is completely nonsensical and the proposed mechanism of action impossible.

== Explanations for positive reports ==
There are several, primarily psychological, explanations for positive reports after energy therapy, including placebo effects, spontaneous remission, and cognitive dissonance. A 2009 review found that the "small successes" reported for two therapies collectively marketed as "energy psychology" (Emotional Freedom Techniques and Tapas Acupressure Technique) "are potentially attributable to well-known cognitive and behavioral techniques that are included with the energy manipulation." The report concluded "Psychologists and researchers should be wary of using such techniques, and make efforts to inform the public about the ill effects of therapies that advertise miraculous claims."

There are primarily two explanations for anecdotes of cures or improvements, relieving any need to appeal to the supernatural. The first is post hoc ergo propter hoc, meaning that a genuine improvement or spontaneous remission may have been experienced coincidental with but independent from anything the healer or patient did or said. These patients would have improved just as well even had they done nothing. The second is the placebo effect, through which a person may experience genuine pain relief and other symptomatic alleviation. In this case, the patient genuinely has been helped by the healer – not through any mysterious or numinous function, but by the power of their own belief that they would be healed. In both cases, the patient may experience a real reduction in symptoms, though in neither case has anything miraculous or inexplicable occurred. Both cases are strictly limited to the body's natural abilities.

Positive findings from research studies can also result from such psychological mechanisms, or as a result of experimenter bias, methodological flaws such as lack of blinding, or publication bias; positive reviews of the scientific literature may show selection bias, in that they omit key studies that do not agree with the author's position. All of these factors must be considered when evaluating claims.

== See also ==
- Albert Abrams
- Electromagnetic therapy (alternative medicine)
- Electrotherapy
- Energy field disturbance
- Fraudulent Mediums Act 1951
- Hologram bracelet
- Johrei
- Magnetic resonance therapy
- Prayer
- Psychokinesis
- Radionics
- Royal Commission on Animal Magnetism
- The Sunflower Jam
- Witchcraft Acts
- Zero Balancing
- List of branches of alternative medicine
- List of ineffective cancer treatments
- List of unproven and disproven cancer treatments
