= Jin Shin Do =

Therapeutic acupressure technique

Jin Shin Do ("The Way of the Compassionate Spirit") is a therapeutic acupressure technique developed by psychotherapist Iona Marsaa Teeguarden, beginning in the 1970s.

Jin Shin Do classes teach the use of gentle yet deep finger pressure on specific acu-points and verbal Body Focusing techniques.

Jin Shin Do mixes acupressure, Taoist philosophy, and the ideas of Wilhelm Reich and claims to be able to detect and purge "stagnant energy" from the body. Jin Shin Do is recognized as a major form of Asian Bodywork Therapy by AOBTA, NCBTMB, NCCAOM, and the U.S. Department of Education among others.

== Approach ==
Generally a "local point" in a tense area is held, together with related "distal points" which, though distant from the tense area, help it to release because of functional and energetic relationships. As in Shiatsu, the client remains fully clothed.

== See also ==
- Acupressure
- Barbara Brennan
- Johrei
- Kampo
- Kappo
- Macrobiotic diet
- Meridians
- Reiki
- Shiatsu

== Sources ==
Allison, Nancy, CMA, Editor; The Illustrated Encyclopedia of Body-Mind Disciplines (1999), The Rosen Publishing Group, Inc., pp. 178, 180, 187–190

Andrews, Synthia & Dempsey, Bobbi; Acupressure & Reflexology for Dummies (2007), Wiley Publishing, Inc., pp. 122, 317, 320

Langevin, Helene M., and colleagues at the University of Vermont, "Relationship of acupuncture points and meridians to connective tissues planes":

Loecher, Barbara & O’Donnell, Sara Altshul & the Editors of Prevention Magazine Health Books; New Choices in Natural Healing for Women (1997) Rodale Press, Inc., pp. 13, 15, 407.

Swinford, Patricia & Webster, Judith; Promoting Wellness – A Nurse's Handbook (1989), Aspen Publishers, Inc., p. 206

Teeguarden, Iona Marsaa; A Complete Guide to Acupressure, Revised (2003; 1st version 1996), originally published by Japan Publications & now by the Jin Shin Do Foundation

Teeguarden, Iona Marsaa; Acupressure Way of Health: Jin Shin Do® (1978), originally published by Japan Publications & now by Redwing Books

Teeguarden, Iona Marsaa; Extraordinary Energy Flows, Oriental Medicine, a publication of the Pacific College of Oriental Medicine; San Diego, CA (summer 2004), p. 13, 22–23

Teeguarden, Iona Marsaa; The Joy of Feeling: Bodymind Acupressure®, (1984, 2003), originally published by Japan Publications & now by the Jin Shin Do Foundation

Teeguarden, Iona Marsaa; What are Meridians and Points?, Oriental Medicine, a publication of the Pacific College of Oriental Medicine; San Diego, CA (fall 2007), pp. 6, 34, 35.
