= Thelma Moss =

American actress, psychologist and parapsychologist (1918–1997)

- Born: Thelma Schnee; January 6, 1918; Connecticut, US
- Died: February 1, 1997 (aged 79)
- Education: Carnegie Tech
- Occupations: Actress; psychologist; parapsychologist
- Spouse: Paul F. Moss (died 1954)
- Children: Leland Moss

Thelma Moss (nee Schnee, January 6, 1918 – February 1, 1997) was an American actress, and later a psychologist and parapsychologist, best known for her work on Kirlian photography and the human aura.

== Biography ==
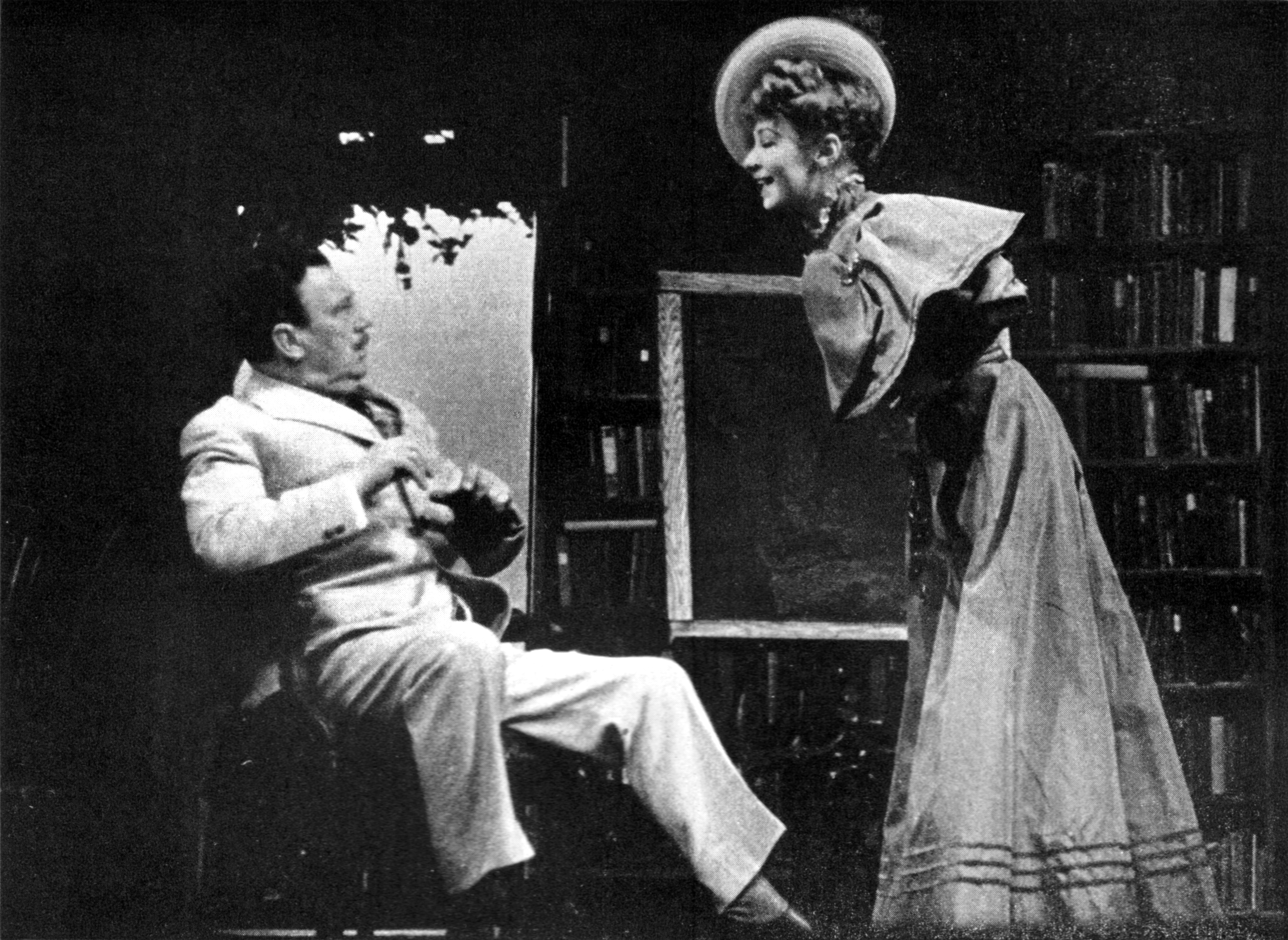
Edmund Breon and Thelma Schnee in the original Broadway production of The Corn Is Green (1940–41)

Born Thelma Schnee, a native of Connecticut, Thelma Moss graduated from Carnegie Tech, and originally pursued a career in acting and in writing scripts for film and television. She was one of the earliest members of The Actors Studio; as a scriptwriter, her biggest success was the screenplay for the 1954 Alec Guinness film Father Brown. She also wrote the script for the 1958 science fiction film The Colossus of New York, about the implantation of a human brain belonging to a brilliant scientist (played by Ross Martin) into a large humanoid robot.

However, she struggled for years with persistent psychological problems, rooted in depression and grief at the loss of her husband (he died of cancer two days after she gave birth to a baby daughter). She survived two suicide attempts. For treatment for her problems, she underwent a course of LSD psychotherapy; she later published an autobiographical account of her treatment, My Self and I, under the pseudonym Constance A. Newland; the book was a bestseller in 1962.

Actor Alec Guinness told a story in a media interview and wrote in his memoir that he was with Moss going to dinner in 1955 when they met James Dean and Guinness predicted Dean's death one week before he was killed in a car accident.

Moss returned to academia in the mid-1960s, studying at the UCLA Neuropsychiatric Institute and interning at the Wadsworth Veterans Hospital; she earned her Ph.D. in psychology from UCLA and became a professor at the same institution. For a time in the 1970s she led UCLA's parapsychology laboratory (while it existed). She explored a wide range of specific subjects in parapsychology (hypnosis, ghosts, levitation, alternative medicine), though her research on Kirlian photography was the most significant theme in her work for the remainder of her career. Moss came to believe that Kirlian photography depicts the astral body. She made several trips to the Soviet Union to explore Russian work in the field, and wrote two books on that and related subjects, plus lesser works.

== Books ==
- My Self and I (pseudo. Constance A. Newland), New York, Coward McCann, 1962.
- The Probability of the Impossible: Scientific Discoveries and Exploration in the Psychic World, Los Angeles, J.P. Tarcher, 1974.
- Body Electric: A Personal Journey into the Mysteries of Parapsychological Research, Bioenergy and Kirlian Photography, Los Angeles, J.P. Tarcher, 1979.

== Short films ==
- Power Of Plants (1950) - John Kieran's Kaleidoscope https://www.youtube.com/watch?v=5ZCKy61DNrE

== Media appearances ==
- The Invisible World (1979) - National Geographic [Documentary Interview]

== See also ==
- Etheric body
