= Leland Moss =

American theatre director (1948–1990)

- Born: Leland Eric Moss; 30 March 1948; New York
- Died: 24 Jan 1990 (age 41); San Francisco
- Education: Harvard University
- Occupation: Theatre Director
- Known for: The AIDS Show

Leland Moss (March 30, 1948 – January 24, 1990 San Francisco, California) was an American theatre director, writer, and gay activist who died from AIDS at age 41.

== Life and work ==
Moss graduated from Beverly Hills High School and was a National Merit Scholar. Moss studied at Harvard University and at the London Academy of Music and Dramatic Art. After London, he moved to New York City to pursue a career in theatre. He worked at La MaMa Experimental Theatre Club, Playwrights Horizons, and the New York Shakespeare Festival, among other venues.

His first production at La MaMa was And Things That Go Bump in the Night, adapted from the play by Terrence McNally, in 1971. The production opened at the Loeb Experimental Theatre in Cambridge, Massachusetts, where the company was based, before playing at La MaMa in Manhattan. It then played at the Emmanuel Church in Boston. In 1972, he performed with La MaMa's Great Jones Repertory Company on their European tour, which included performances in Germany, the Netherlands, Italy, Lebanon, France, and Denmark. The company toured with a production of Euripides' Medea adapted and directed by Andrei Serban with music by Elizabeth Swados.

In 1973, Moss directed a production of Shakespeare's Measure for Measure at La MaMa. He also directed his company, the "Y" La MaMa Workshop, in a production of Roy Kift's Play Mary Play. The production first played at the YM-YWHA of Mid-Westchester (in Scarsdale, New York), then at La MaMa in Manhattan.

He is best known for The AIDS Show, a collaborative work he created in 1984 while living in San Francisco. In San Francisco, he worked with the Theatre Rhinoceros. A documentary about the play was made for public television and shown in November 1986.

== Family ==
Leland Moss was the son of actress Thelma Moss and the producer Paul F. Moss (né Moskovitz).
