= Aura (paranormal) =

Parapsychological and spiritual concept

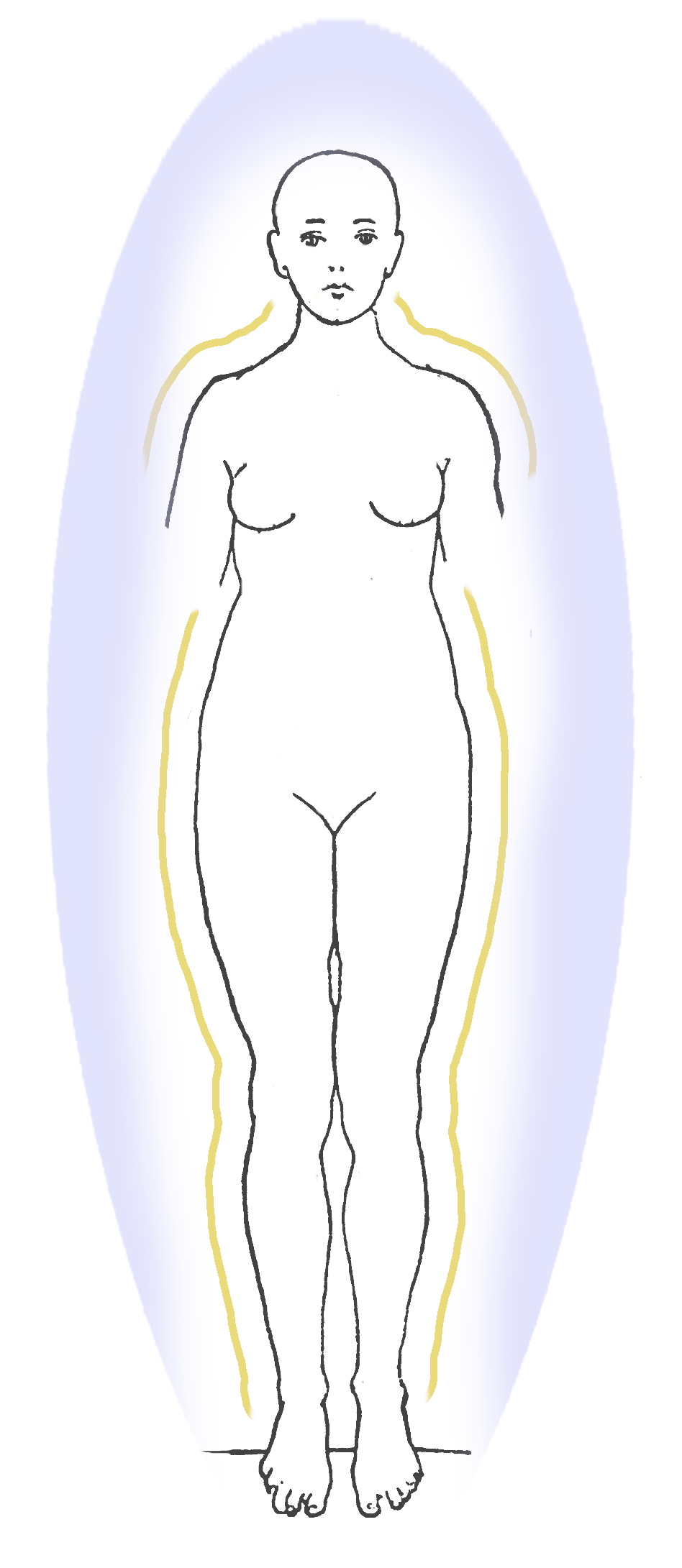
Representation of a human aura, after a diagram by Walter John Kilner (1847–1920)

In parapsychology and some spiritual traditions, an aura, or energy field, is said to be an emanation produced by and surrounding the body of a person, animal or object, unique to the individual, and which is typically regarded to be an ever present and essential part of its being. In some esoteric positions, the aura is described as a subtle body. Psychics and holistic medicine practitioners often claim to have the ability to see the size, color and type of vibration of an aura.

In spiritual alternative medicine, the human aura is seen as part of a hidden anatomy that reflects the state of being and health of a client, often understood to even comprise centers of vital force called chakras. Such claims are not supported by scientific evidence and are thus considered pseudoscience. When tested under scientific controlled experiments, the ability to see auras has not been proven to exist.

== Etymology ==
In Latin and Ancient Greek, aura means wind, breeze or breath. It was used in Middle English to mean "gentle breeze". By the end of the 19th century, the word was used in some spiritualist circles to describe a speculated subtle emanation around the body.

== History ==
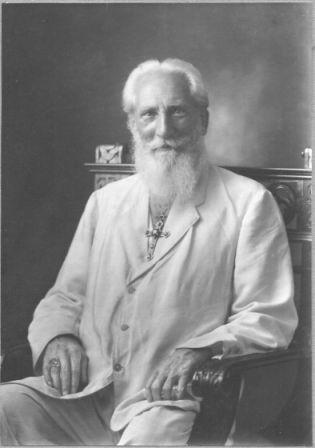
Charles Webster Leadbeater is credited with developing and popularizing the concept of auras.

The concept of auras was first popularized by Charles Webster Leadbeater, a former priest of the Church of England and a member of the mystic Theosophical Society. He had studied theosophy in India, and believed he had the capacity to use his clairvoyant powers to make scientific investigations. He claimed that he had discovered that most men came from Mars but the more advanced men came from the Moon, and that hydrogen atoms were made of six bodies contained in an egg-like form. In his book Man Visible and Invisible, published in 1903, Leadbeater illustrated the aura of man at various stages of his moral evolution, from the "savage" to the saint. In 1910, he introduced the modern conception of auras by incorporating the Tantric notion of chakras in his book The Inner Life. Leadbeater did not simply present the Tantric beliefs to the West: he reconstructed and reinterpreted them by mixing them with his own ideas. Some of Leadbeater's innovations are describing chakras as energy vortices, and associating each of them with a gland, an organ and other body parts.

In the following years, Leadbeater's ideas on the aura and chakras were adopted and reinterpreted by other theosophists such as Rudolf Steiner and Edgar Cayce, but his occult anatomy remained of minor interest within the esoteric counterculture until the 1980s, when it was picked up by the New Age movement.

In 1977, American esotericist Christopher Hills published the book Nuclear Evolution: The Rainbow Body, which presented a modified version of Leadbeater's occult anatomy. Whereas Leadbeater had drawn each chakras with intricately detailed shapes and multiple colors, Hills presented them as a sequence of centers, each one being associated with a color of the rainbow. Most of the subsequent New Age writers based their representations of the aura on Hill's interpretation of Leadbeater's ideas. Chakras became a part of mainstream esoteric speculations in the 1980s and 1990s. Many New Age techniques that aim to clear blockages of the chakras were developed during those years, such as crystal healing and aura-soma. By the late 1990s chakras were less connected with their theosophical and Hindu roots, and more infused with New Age ideas. A variety of New Age books proposed different links between each chakras and colors, personality traits, illnesses, Christian sacraments, etc. Various type of holistic healing within the New Age movement claim to use aura reading techniques, such as bioenergetic analysis, spiritual energy and energy medicine.

== Auric energy ==
In yoga participants attempt to focus on, or enhance their "auric energy shield". The concept of auric energy is spiritual and is concerned with metaphysics. Some people think that the aura carries a person's soul after death.

== Aura photography ==
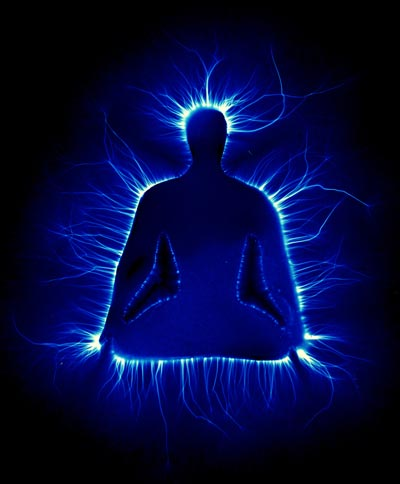
An artistic representation of a man in the Lotus position, surrounded by a blue glow

There have been numerous attempts to capture an energy field around the human body, going as far back as photographs by French physician Hippolyte Baraduc in the 1890s. Supernatural interpretations of these images have often been the result of a lack of understanding of the simple natural phenomena behind them, such as heat emanating from a human body producing aura-like images under infrared photography.

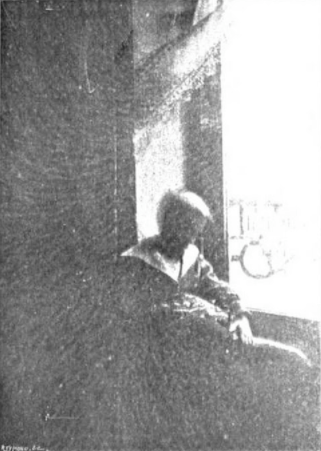
Picture by Hippolyte Baraduc published in 1896, purported to show a "vital force" around a child

In 1939, Semyon Davidovich Kirlian discovered that by placing an object or body part directly on photographic paper, and then passing a high voltage across the object, he would obtain the image of a glowing contour surrounding the object. This process came to be known as Kirlian photography. Some parapsychologists, such as Thelma Moss of UCLA, have proposed that these images show levels of psychic powers and bioenergies. However, studies have found that the Kirlian effect is caused by the presence of moisture on the object being photographed. Electricity produces an area of gas ionization around the object if it is moist, which is the case for living things. This causes an alternation of the electric charge pattern on the film. After rigorous experimentations, no mysterious process has been discovered in relation to the Kirlian photography.

More recent attempts at capturing auras include the Aura Imaging cameras and software introduced by Guy Coggins in 1992. Coggins claims that his software uses biofeedback data to color the picture of the subject. The technique has failed to yield reproducible results.

== Tests ==
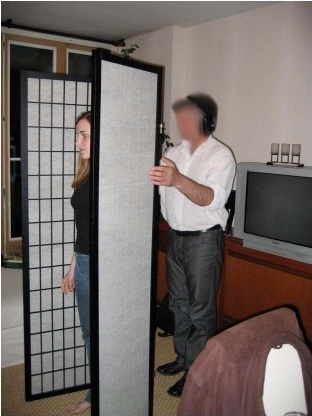
An aura reader tested in a controlled experiment at the Observatoire Zététique, May 2004

Tests of psychic abilities to observe alleged aura emanations have repeatedly been met with failure.

One test involved placing people in a dark room and asking the psychic to state how many auras she could observe. Only chance results were obtained.

Recognition of auras has occasionally been tested on television. One test involved an aura reader standing on one side of a room with an opaque partition separating her from a number of slots which might contain either actual people or mannequins. The aura reader failed to identify the slots containing people, incorrectly stating that all contained people.

In another televised test another aura reader was placed before a partition where five people were standing. He claimed that he could see their auras from behind the partition. As each person moved out, the reader was asked to identify where that person was standing behind the slot. He identified two out of five correctly.

Attempts to prove the existence of auras scientifically have repeatedly met with failure; for example people are unable to see auras in complete darkness, and auras have never been successfully used to identify people when their identifying features are otherwise obscured in controlled tests. A 1999 study concluded that conventional sensory cues such as radiated body heat might be mistaken for evidence of a metaphysical phenomenon.

Instrumental searches have also been unsuccessful. In 1982 George Karolyi and colleagues at the University of Adelaide reported that a cooled photomultiplier tube detected no absorption, scattering or self-luminosity in the space around the body between 200 and 900 nm, although the skin itself emitted very weak light. Karolyi later estimated that this light was one to two orders of magnitude below the threshold of the dark-adapted eye.

== Scientific explanation ==
Psychologist Andrew Neher has written that "there is no good evidence to support the notion that auras are, in any way, psychic in origin".

It has been suggested that auras may result from synaesthesia. However, a 2012 study discovered no link between auras and synaesthesia, concluding that "the discrepancies found suggest that both phenomena are phenomenological and behaviourally dissimilar". Clinical neurologist Steven Novella has written: "Given the weight of the evidence it seems that the connection between auras and synaesthesia is speculative and based on superficial similarities that are likely coincidental."

Bridgette Perez, in a review for the Skeptical Inquirer, wrote: "perceptual distortions, illusions, and hallucinations might promote belief in auras... Psychological factors, including absorption, fantasy proneness, vividness of visual imagery, and after-images, might also be responsible for the phenomena of the aura."

Scientists have repeatedly concluded that the ability to see auras does not actually exist.

== In popular culture ==
- The book The Third Eye, written by Cyril Henry Hoskin under the pseudonym Lobsang Rampa, claims that Tibetan monks opened the spiritual third eye using trepanation in order to accelerate the development of clairvoyance and allow them to see the aura. It also includes body gazing techniques purported to help achieve aura visualization. The book is by some considered to be a hoax.
- Auras are an integral part of the 1994 novel Insomnia by Stephen King. Through constant insomnia, the main character, Ralph Roberts, begins to see the world as different colored auras.
- In the Pokémon series, Lucario, introduced in Pokémon Diamond and Pearl (2006), is known as the "Aura Pokémon" and it's said to be able to tell how others feel by reading the auras of all things. Additionally, the concept of aura inspired the English names of two different moves: the Fighting-type move Aura Sphere and the Electric-type move Aura Wheel. The Pokémon Kirlia seems to receive its English name from the Kirlian photography.

== See also ==
- Aureola
- Clairvoyance
- Confirmation bias
- Energy field disturbance
- Halo (religious iconography)
- Human Design
- Lesya
- List of topics characterized as pseudoscience
- Metaphysics
- Scientific skepticism
- Spirit photography
