= Kappo =

Healing techniques used in martial arts

Kappo (活法, kappō; "resuscitation techniques") are healing techniques that often involve stimulation of specific acupuncture points. Kappo is commonly used in martial arts such as Danzan Ryu and Judo. Kappo contains two kanji: katsu (活 “resuscitation, life”) and ho (法 “method”).

More specifically, kappo refers to resuscitation techniques used to revive someone who has been choked to the point of unconsciousness, to lessen the pain of a strike to the groin, to help unlock a seized thoracic diaphragm, to stop a bleeding nose, and other common training injuries. These techniques, as practiced by the martial arts of Judo and Danzan Ryu, can involve striking specific points on the body, manual manipulation of the carotid triangle to open closed arteries, or manually opening and closing the lungs to allow air to flow in and out. The manual manipulation of breathing, which has some similarities with rescue breathing and CPR, is called katsu.

A tradition in some Judo schools involves teaching kappo to all new shodan (black belts). This instruction is followed by a session where each of the shodan choke someone, are choked themselves, and resuscitate someone using kappo.

== Homophone ==
Japanese language contains many homophones; Kappō written as 割烹 means “cooking” especially relating to Japanese cuisine.

== See also ==
- Acupressure
- Jin Shin Do
- Johrei
- Kampo
- Macrobiotic diet
- Meridians
- Reiki
- Shiatsu
