= Human Design =

Parascientific Spiritual blueprint & guide to synergistic living

Human Design is a pseudoscientific theory and practice described as a holistic self-knowledge system. It combines astrology, the Chinese I Ching, Judaic Kabbalah, Vedic philosophy, and modern physics.

== Origins and purpose ==
Human Design was originated by Alan Robert Krakower, who published a book called The Human Design System under the pseudonym Ra Uru Hu in 1992. Krakower was previously an advertising executive and magazine publisher. Krakower developed the Human Design system following an alleged mystical experience in 1987.

It purports to be a self-knowledge method which does not have any specific religious dogma or affiliation. However, it has been described by theologian J. R. Hustwit as a "transreligious project" that is "breathtaking in scope" and synthesizes seven or more traditions.

== Elements of Human Design ==
Human Design centers around the division of human beings into four "energy types," a term which attempts to describe categorial distinctions of the aura. The four types are: Manifestors, Generators, Projectors, and Reflectors. The hybrid Manifesting Generator is sometimes designated a fifth energy type. Each type has its corresponding "strategy," a mode of behavior that is natural to the functioning of that aura. Human Design focuses specifically on these aura dynamics, using this information to prescribe "self" and "not self" themes that are intended to be evaluative of subjective well-being.

Human Design also maps nine energy centers in the body. An individual's bodygraph reveals which of these centers are "defined", meaning that they are consistent and reliable in their functioning.

In Human Design analysis, planets are displayed in a type of horoscope called a bodygraph. The bodygraph shows the 64 hexagrams of the I Ching at various locations on the body. It is sometimes shown within a mandala, overlaid on the 12 signs of the zodiac.

== Legal Controversy over Copyright ==
On June 3, 2020, the Court of Florence issued an order stating that there can be no copyright over the Human Design system.

The order followed a lawsuit filed by Human Design Italia, an association claiming to hold exclusive copyright in Italy and in the Italian language, based on a license from Alan Krakower's (Ra Uru Hu) company, Jovian Archive.

Human Design Italia had sued an Italian publisher, Terra Nuova, following the June 2019 publication of the book Human Design – Scopri la Tua Vera Natura by Chetan Parkyn, arguing that no one other than Human Design Italia had the right to publish books on Human Design.

After a summary proceeding, the judge ruled otherwise. In the decision, the court stated that the plaintiffs had provided no evidence proving they held exclusive rights over “the Human Design system” or its teachings. These teachings involve ideas, procedures, and methods of representation that can be freely discussed, referenced, and illustrated by those who are not their authors, without this constituting a violation of intellectual property rights. Nor is it necessary to be authorized by a school or its founders in order to do so, as under Italian law, the expression of ideas is free and not subject to sectarian control.

The principle, established under U.S. law and accepted by the Berne Convention for all signatory countries (including Italy), affirms that no copyright can be recognized over “an idea, procedure, process, system, method of operation, concept, principle, or discovery, regardless of the form in which it is described.” Therefore: “If Krakower cannot hold a general copyright over his ideas (as opposed to his specific works), then he cannot have transferred such a right to others.”

As a result:

“The object of the transfer [from Jovian Archive to Human Design Italia] cannot be the exploitation of a copyright that does not exist.”

And further:

“Neither [Jovian Archive] nor its successors can prevent others from publishing additional [works] on the ‘Human Design System.’” _{[Quotes translated from Court Order: Ordinanza del Tribunale di Firenze: Verbale di prima udienza n. cronol. 944/2020 del 03/06/2020 RG n. 2756/2020, Sezione Imprese, Giudice dott. Niccolò Calvani]}
