= The AIDS Show =

1986 theater piece

The AIDS Show (Artists Involved with Death and Survival) is a 1984 American collaboratively written theatre piece created to address the social impact HIV/AIDS had on the LGBTQ community. A 1986 documentary film of the same name was developed by producer and writer Rob Epstein and filmmaker Peter Adair.

== Productions ==
=== 1984 production ===
The AIDS Show was first produced by Theatre Rhinoceros, a San Francisco based theatre company, in September 1984 as The AIDS Show: Artists Involved with Death and Survival. Initial inspiration for the production came from several people including Allan B. Estes, founder of Theatre Rhinoceros, who died before the shows debut. The intention was to address the fears in the community and to portray how HIV/AIDS was affecting lovers and families. This was one of the first efforts giving voice to the "emotional turmoil" created by the epidemic.

Directed by Leland Moss, the show was more like a review than a play, as it consisted of a series of vignettes built predominantly from the real-life experiences of the cast. The skits or scenes presented the perspectives of nurses, mothers, gay men "friend groups", romantic relationships, older gay men/women, the straight population, and those who lost loved ones to the disease.

The original production was intended to run for nine shows but was extended for several months because it was so well received by audiences. Gaining notoriety, the show traveled throughout the country performing at street fairs, jails, and hospitals. Creators say it was designed to be portable. A notable tour performance took place before the Shanti Project, an organization that trained people to support and guide those who were living with terminal illnesses.

The 1984 production was both criticized and applauded for giving such a candid look at how the community was dealing with the crisis. Audience members within the community praised the show for giving form to their experiences, while those in the cast said the play offered a medium for confronting the epidemic.

=== 1985 production ===
In 1985 the play was updated and co-directed by Leland Moss and Doug Holsclaw, a writer and actor from the 1984 original. Under the new title The AIDS Show: Unfinished Business, the revised show reflected the change in the "mood of the city [San Francisco]." By this time HIV/AIDS was not as mysterious as it once was, specific problems in the world of medicine were being addressed, and people were learning to live with the reality of the disease. This new show was designed to mirror this growth. Unfinished Business debuted in October 1985 and continued on various stages for another year.

=== 1986 Documentary ===
In 1986 a PBS documentary, under the same name as the stage show and created by Rob Epstein and Peter Adair, was released. Epstein and Adair state in the opening of the film that they originally intended to make a film discussing the effect of HIV/AIDS on the population of the 70,000 gay men in the San Francisco area, when a friend pointed them in the direction of The AIDS Show. Upon their first viewing both men noted that the show was more social, less medical, and refused to filter itself when discussing the disease or disease transmission. The result is a film which consists of interviews featuring several members of the cast and crew, separated by scenes from the production, all in conversation with the current events of San Francisco. This was one of the first films to deal with the subject of HIV/AIDS.
