= Capnomor =

Aromatic oil extracted from beechwood tar

Capnomor (from Greek smoke + part) is a colorless oil with an aromatic odor which is extracted by distillation from beechwood tar. Its specific gravity is 0.9775 at 20 °C and boiling point is 185 °C. It was discovered in the 1830s by the German chemist Baron Karl von Reichenbach.
