= Theatre Rhinoceros =

LGBTQ theatre

Coordinates: 37.7606°N 122.4367°W

Theatre Rhinoceros, Theatre Rhino, or The Rhino is a gay and lesbian theatre in San Francisco. Theatre Rhinoceros claims to be the world's longest-running professional queer theatre company. It was founded in the spring of 1977 by Lanny Baugniet (who became the theater's General Manager) and his late partner Allan B. Estes, Jr. (who became the theater's Artistic Director). The name is based on the lavender rhinoceros, a symbol popularized by the Boston gay community in the mid-1970s. It is a non-profit theater company dedicated to the production of plays by and about gay and lesbian people.

Theatre Rhinoceros is the first gay theater company to employ actors under a professional seasonal agreement. The company was recognized by the California State Assembly on its twenty-fifth anniversary and again as a pioneering organization at the twenty-fifth anniversary remembrance of assassinated San Francisco Supervisor Harvey Milk.

== History ==
Their first production, mounted in August 1977, was Lanford Wilson's The Madness of Lady Bright, at the Gay Community Center (then located at 330 Grove Street in San Francisco, now the site of the Performing Arts Parking Garage), produced by Baugniet, and directed by Estes. That first season continued with Gays at Play, Stone Rhino, Gayhem, and David Guerdon's The Laundry, directed by Baugniet. The operating budget for that first year was $3,900 — an amount which doubled every year for the company's first seven years of operation to $250,000 for its 1983–1984 season.

=== 1978–1979 Season ===
The 1978–1979 season opened with a revamping of Gays at Play, which consisted of LeRoi Jones' The Baptism (directed by Estes) and Fred Puliafito's Para de Noya (directed by Baugniet) — but it was the monumental success of the next production, Doric Wilson's West Street Gang (performed at the South of Market leather bar The Black & Blue), that won the company's first Cable Car Award and enabled the company to establish residence in its first home at the Goodman Building at 1115 Geary Street. The season concluded with Male Rites, which included C.D. Arnold's Downtown Local, Robert Chesley's Hell, I Love You, Lanford Wilson's The Great Nebula in Orion, and Cal Yeomans's Richmond Jim, which production also toured to New York.

=== 1979–1980 Season ===
The 1979–1980 season was dedicated to a festival of plays by Robert Patrick which included See Other Side, Fred and Harold, The Loves of the Artists, Haunted Host, Kennedy's Children, T-Shirts, and My Cup Ranneth Over. The season concluded with Doric Wilson's A Perfect Relationship. By this time, Baugniet had written successful grants for the fledgling theater company from the City & County of San Francisco, the California Arts Council, and the National Endowment for the Arts, and he had formulated a successful subscription campaign that was second only in numbers to the American Conservatory Theater in the San Francisco Bay Area.

=== 1980–1981 Season ===
The 1980–1981 season consisted of Doric Wilson's Forever After, Joel Schwartz's Power Lines, Noel Grieg's The Dear Love of Comrades, Harvey Fierstein's The International Stud, Victor Bumbalo's Kitchen Duty and American Coffee, and Arch Brown's News Boy. Theatre Rhinoceros also opened its studio theater during this season with Cal Yeomans' The Line Forms to the Rear and Dan Curzon's Beer and Rhubarb Pie, and hired its third full-time employee, Raleigh Waugh, as Technical Director.

=== 1981–1982 Season ===
The 1981–1982 season opened with C.D. Arnold's Dinosaurs, the final production at the Goodman Building, after which the company moved into its quarters at the Redstone Building at 2926 16th Street. The inaugural productions in the company's new theatre were Harvey Fierstein's Fugue in a Nursery on the main stage and Robert Chesley's Stray Dog Story in the studio. The remaining main stage productions for that year were George Birimisa's Pogey Bait, Doric Wilson's Street Theater, Noël Coward's Design for Living, and a revival of T-Shirts.

=== 1982–1983 Season ===
The 1982–1983 main stage season consisted of Robert Graham's Sins of the Father, Jane Chambers' My Blue Heaven, Arthur Laurents' The Enclave, Victor Bumbalo's Niagara Falls, C.D. Arnold's King of the Crystal Palace (one of the first produced plays to deal with AIDS), and a revival of A Perfect Relationship.

=== 1983–1984 Season ===
The 1983–1984 main stage season included Bill Russell's Fortune, Tennessee Williams' Vieux Carré, Jane Chambers' A Late Snow, Richard Benner's Crystal Blaze, Adele Prandini's Safe Light, Lanford Wilson's 5th of July (it was during the run of this play that Estes died of AIDS), and Richard Gray's Bad Drama.

After Estes' death, Baugniet turned the theater over to his staff and retired into private life. Including studio productions and staged readings, he had produced over one hundred titles for the theater company. Baugniet's papers are housed at the GLBT Historical Society in San Francisco and the Bancroft Library at the University of California, Berkeley.

=== 1984–1990 ===
Under the artistic direction of Kristine Gannon (1984–1987), The Rhino continued to realize Estes' vision. Committed to exploring the impact of AIDS on the gay community, The Rhino produced several important new plays, including the collaboratively written The AIDS Show: Artists Involved with Death and Survival and an updated version titled Unfinished Business that was the subject of a PBS documentary by Rob Epstein and Peter Adair, Doug Holsclaw's Life of the Party and The Baddest of Boys, Leland Moss's Quisbies, Robert Pitman's Passing, Anthony Bruno's Soul Survivor, and the Henry Mach–Paul Katz (not to be confused with cellist Paul Katz), musical Dirty Dreams of a Clean-Cut Kid, as well as cult classics like Tom Eyen's Women Behind Bars. Charles Solomon (1987-1988) and Kenneth R. Dixon (1988-1990) expanded The Rhino's boundaries of inclusiveness by staging several African-American productions.

=== 1990–1999 ===
Under the leadership of Artistic Director Adele Prandini (1990–1999), the Rhino forged partnerships with many groups, including Luna Sea, Teatro de la Esperanza, Black Artists Contemporary Cultural Experience, The Asian AIDS Project, and the Latino/a AIDS Festival. It received commendations from the City of Berkeley, the City and County of San Francisco, and the State of California on its fifteenth and twentieth anniversaries.

Prandini continued as an artistic force writing and directing Coconut, directing Chay Yew's Porcelain and Beyond Bagdad, a wildly successful musical written by Pamela Forrest and Doug Holsclaw. Holsclaw continued as Rhino's most important male writers, with works including Don't Make Me Say Things that will Hurt You, directed by Sabin Epstein, Out Calls Only, The Plunge, and The Sensational Sin Sisters, directed by Prandini, and The Last Hairdresser, directed by Danny Scheie, which won a Critics Circle Award (tie) for Best New Play.

Jumping the Broom, produced in fall 1993, was a collection of sketches around the theme of gay marriage, commitment and domestic partnership.

=== 1999–2003 ===
Doug Holsclaw (1999–2003) presided over the premiere of new works by Marga Gomez, Latin Hustle, Jason Post, John Fisher, F. Allen Sawyer, Marvin White, and Guillermo Reyes. The entire twenty-fifth anniversary season was celebrated with world premiere works by Johari Jabir, Sara Moore, Fisher, Kate Bornstein, and Ronnie Larsen as well as special performances by Kate Clinton and Gomez.

=== 2004–2009 ===
Under the artistic direction of Fisher, Theatre Rhinoceros remained committed to Allan Estes' original vision of developing and producing works of theatre that enlighten, enrich, and explore all aspects of the gay community.

2004 saw the first full American staging of Alan Bennett's Single Spies (two one-acts: "An Englishman Abroad" and "A Question of Attribution"), which was co-directed by John Fisher and Jeffrey Hartgraves. Featuring John Fisher, Jeffrey Hartgraves, Libby O'Connell, Matt Weimer, Greg Lucey, and Dominick Marrone.

2005 featured the holiday production of George S. Kaufman and Moss Hart's classic farce The Man Who Came to Dinner, starring a collection of some of the Bay Area's best-known local actors, including Floriana Alessandria, David Bicha, P. A. Cooley, Matthew Martin, Kim Larsen, Matt Weimer, Libby O'Connell, and Jeffrey Hartgraves.

2006 featured the remounting of the critically acclaimed Family Jewels: the Making of Veronica Klaus by Jeffrey Hartgraves and Veronica Klaus, directed by Jeffrey Hartgraves. This production was subsequently brought back for another run in 2007.

2007 brought innovation and experimentation with the creation of The Studio Project There's Something About Marriage which explored the issues and opinions surrounding the topic of gay marriage. Conceived and created by John Fisher, David Bicha, and Maryssa Wanlass. With cameos by Drew Todd, Jeffrey Hartgraves, and Matthew Martin. This year also saw the first staging of Shark Bites (a very nearly solo show) written by and starring Jeffrey Hartgraves. Directed by Libby O'Connell and featuring Drew Todd, P. A. Cooley, David Bicha, davidmahr, and T.J. Lee. This show was remounted in 2008.

=== 2009–present ===
In 2009, the rising cost of rent caused Theatre Rhino to vacate the Redstone Building. Subsequent shows have been produced at multiple venues across San Francisco, primarily at the Gateway Theatre (once home of the Eureka Theatre Company) at 215 Jackson Street. As of 2023, they are operating out of 4229 18th, a storefront in the Castro.
