= Hippolyte Baraduc =

French physician and parapsychologist (1850–1909)

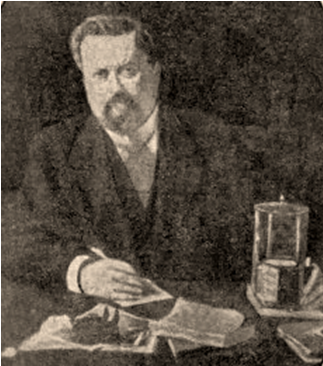
Hippolyte Baraduc

Hippolyte Ferdinand Baraduc (November 15, 1850 – May 1, 1909) was a French physician and parapsychologist, highly known for his depiction of thoughts and feelings using iconography. He was born in Hyères, Var, France, and died in Paris.

== Mesmerism ==
In his research, Baraduc ended up delving into topics on animal magnetism following the studies of Carl Reichenbach, mentioning in his 1895 thesis the difference between fluids: cosmic, vital and magnetic, all cataloged and examined in his works.

== Fluidic photography ==
Baraduc believed it was possible to photograph human mental states or emotions, such as grief and mourning, as well as the human soul. In his 1896 book The Human Soul (L'Âme humaine), Baraduc published photographs referred to as "psychicones", or images of the soul, that he claimed were created by a "psycho-odic-fluidic-current" interacting with the photographic plates. Baraduc's claims to have photographed the human soul were also made in a paper read before the Society of Psychic Sciences in Paris.

== Bibliography ==
- Baraduc, Hippolyte (1902), "La Suggestion Phonographique" ('Phonographic Suggestion', delivered to the Sixth Session of the Congress, 17 August 1900), pp. 231-233 in Bérillon, Edgar and Farez, Paul (1902), Deuxième congrès international de l'hypnotisme expérimental et thérapeutic tenu à Paris du 12 au 18 Août 1902 (sic), Paris: Revue de L'hypnotisme, 1902.
- Georges Didi-Huberman, Jean-Martin Charcot, Invention de l'hystérie : Charcot et l'iconographie photographique de la Salpêtrière, Editions Macula; Édition : 5^{e} (2012), Coll. Macula scènes
- Marina Warner Phantasmagoria: Spirit Visions, 2008 ISBN 0199239231
