= Carl Reichenbach =

German scientist and philosopher (1788–1869)

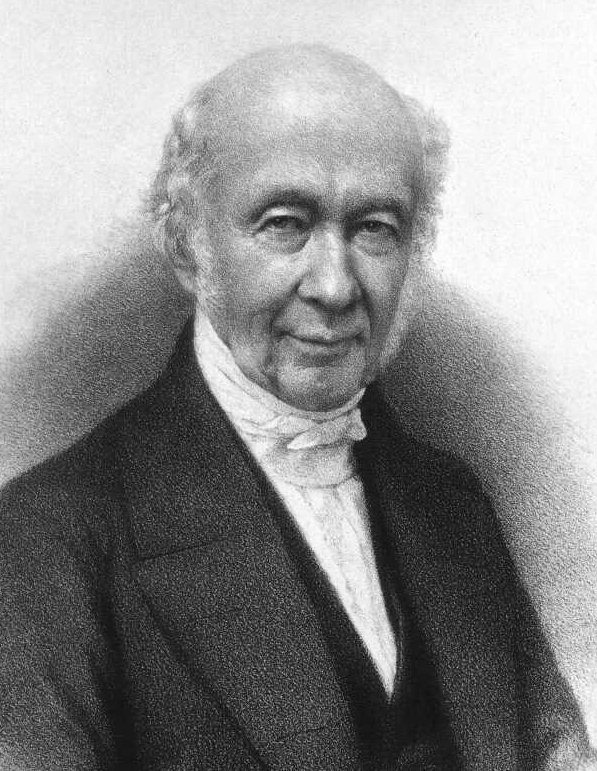
- Carl Ludwig von Reichenbach
- Born: Karl Ludwig Freiherr von Reichenbach; February 12, 1788; Stuttgart, Kingdom of Württemberg, Holy Roman Empire
- Died: January 19, 1869 (aged 80); Leipzig, North German Confederation
- Education: University of Tübingen
- Occupations: Chemist, geologist, metallurgist, naturalist, industrialist and philosopher
- Known for: Odic force

Karl Ludwig Freiherr von Reichenbach (German pronunciation: [ˈkaʁl ˈluːtvɪç ˈfʁaɪhɛʁ fɔn ˈʁaɪçn̩bax]; February 12, 1788 – January 19, 1869), known as Carl Reichenbach, was a German chemist, geologist, metallurgist, naturalist, industrialist and philosopher, and a member of the Prussian Academy of Sciences. He is best known for his discoveries of several chemical products of economic importance, extracted from tar, such as eupione, waxy paraffin, pittacal (the first synthetic dye) and phenol (an antiseptic). He also dedicated his last years to researching an unproved field of energy combining electricity, magnetism and heat, emanating from all living things, which he called the Odic force.

== Life ==
Reichenbach was educated at the University of Tübingen, where he obtained the degree of doctor of philosophy. At the age of 16 he conceived the idea of establishing a new German state in one of the South Sea Islands, and for five years he devoted himself to this project.

Afterwards, directing his attention to the application of science to the industrial arts, he visited manufacturing and metallurgical works in France and Germany, and established the first modern metallurgical company, with forges of his own in Villingen and Hausach in the Black Forest region of Southern Germany and later in Baden.

== Scientific contributions ==
Reichenbach conducted original scientific investigations in many areas. The first geological monograph which appeared in Austria was his Geologische Mitteilungen aus Mähren (Vienna, 1834).

His position as the head of the large chemical works, iron furnaces and machine shops upon the great estate of Count Hugo secured to him excellent opportunities for conducting large-scale experimental research. From 1830 to 1834 he investigated complex products of the distillation of organic substances such as coal and wood tar, discovering a number of valuable hydrocarbon compounds including creosote, paraffin, eupione and phenol (antiseptics), pittacal and cidreret (synthetic dyestuffs), picamar (a perfume base), assamar, capnomor, and others. Under the name of eupione, Reichenbach included the mixture of hydrocarbon oils now known as waxy paraffin or coal oils. In his paper describing the substance, first published in the Neues Jahrbuch der Chemie und Physik, B, ii, he dwelt upon the economical importance of this and of its associate paraffins, whenever the methods of separating them cheaply from natural bituminous compounds would be established.

=== Earth's magnetism ===
Reichenbach expanded on the work of previous scientists, such as Galileo Galilei, who believed the Earth's axis was magnetically connected to a universal central force in space, in concluding that Earth's magnetism comes from magnetic iron, which can be found in meteorites. His reasoning was that meteorites and planets are the same, and no matter the size of the meteorite, polar existence can be found in the object. This was deemed conclusive by the scientific community in the 19th century.

== The Odic force ==
In 1839 Von Reichenbach retired from industry and entered upon an investigation of the pathology of the human nervous system. He studied neurasthenia, somnambulism, hysteria and phobia, crediting reports that these conditions were affected by the moon. After interviewing many patients he ruled out many causes and cures, but concluded that such maladies tended to affect people whose sensory faculties were unusually vivid. These he termed "sensitives".

Influenced by the works of Franz Anton Mesmer he hypothesised that the condition could be affected by environmental electromagnetism, but finally his investigations led him to propose a new imponderable force allied to magnetism, which he thought was an emanation from most substances, a kind of "life principle" which permeates and connects all living things. To this vitalist manifestation he gave the name Odic force.

== Works ==
- Das Kreosot: ein neuentdeckter Bestandtheil des gemeinen Rauches, des Holzessigs und aller Arten von Theer 1833
- Geologische Mitteilungen aus Mähren (Geological news from Moravia) Wien, 1834
- Physikalisch-physiologische Untersuchungen über die Dynamide des Magnetismus, der Elektrizität, der Wärme, des Lichtes, der Krystallisation, des Chemismus in ihren Beziehungen zur Lebenskraft (Band 1 + Band 2) Braunschweig, 1850
- Odisch-magnetische Briefe Stuttgart 1852, 1856; Ulm 1955
- Der sensitive Mensch und sein Verhalten zum Ode (The sensitive human and his behaviour towards Od) Stuttgart und Tübingen (Band 1 1854 + Band 2 1855)
- Köhlerglaube und Afterweisheit: Dem Herrn C. Vogt in Genf zur Antwort Wien, 1855
- Wer ist sensitiv, wer nicht (Who is sensitive, who is not?) Wien, 1856
- Odische Erwiederungen an die Herren Professoren Fortlage, Schleiden, Fechner und Hofrath Carus Wien, 1856
- Die Pflanzenwelt in ihren Beziehungen zur Sensitivität und zum Ode Wien, 1858
- Odische Begebenheiten zu Berlin in den Jahren 1861 und 1862 Berlin, 1862
- Aphorismen über Sensitivität und Od (Aphorisms on Sensitivity and Od) Wien, 1866
- Die odische Lohe und einige Bewegungserscheinungen als neuentdeckte Formen des odischen Princips in der Natur Wien, 1867

English translations:

- Physico-physiological researches on the dynamics of magnetism, electricity, heat, light, crystallization, and chemism, in their relation to Vital Force New York, 1851
- Somnambulism and cramp New York, 1860 (excerpt translated chapter out of Der sensitive Mensch und sein Verhalten zum Ode)
- Letters on Od and Magnetism 1926

== See also ==
- Reichenbach's Otaheiti Society
