= Semyon Kirlian =

Russian inventor

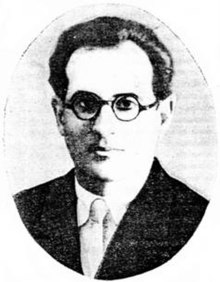
- Born: Semyon Davidovich Kirlian; 20 February 1898; Yekaterinodar, Russian Empire
- Died: 4 April 1978 (aged 80); Krasnodar, Soviet Union
- Occupation: Inventor
- Known for: Kirlian photography

Semyon Davidovich Kirlian (/ˈkɜːrliən/; Russian: Семён Давидович Кирлиан; Armenian: Սիմոն Կիրլյան; 20 February 1898 – 4 April 1978) was a Soviet inventor and researcher of Armenian descent, who along with his wife Valentina Khrisanfovna Kirlian (Russian: Валентина Хрисанфовна Кирлиан; 1904—1971), a teacher and journalist, discovered and developed Kirlian photography.

== Early life ==
Kirlian was born in 1898 Yekaterinodar, Russian Empire (now Krasnodar, Russia) in an Armenian family. He possessed an early interest in, and aptitude for, work with electricity. Just before the Russian Revolution of 1917, Kirlian attended a conference in his home city at which Nikola Tesla gave talks and demonstrations; Tesla was one of Kirlian's predecessors in the field of corona discharge photography. In the 1930s Kirlian earned his living as an electrician in Krasnodar, near the eastern coast of the Black Sea in southern Russia—then the Russian Soviet Federated Socialist Republic (Russian SFSR), part of the Soviet Union. He married Valentina Khrisanovna in 1930.

== First discoveries ==
By 1939 Kirlian had acquired a reputation as the best local resource for repairing electrical equipment, and was regularly called upon to fix the apparatus of scientists and laboratories in the area. In that year, he happened to witness a demonstration of a high-frequency d'Arsonval electrotherapy device. He noticed that there was a small flash of light between the machine's electrodes and the patient's skin, and wondered if he would be able to photograph it. (Kirlian was not the first person to witness this phenomenon, though the urge to photograph and investigate it seems to have been original with him.) Experimenting with similar equipment, he replaced glass electrodes with metal substitutes to take photographs in visible light; at the price of a severe electrical burn, he was able to take an unusual and striking photograph of an apparent energy discharge around his own hand and of others as well.

== Development of Kirlian photography ==
Over the next ten years he and his wife developed and perfected apparatus for what we now call Kirlian photography. They employed a high-frequency oscillator or spark generator that operated at 75 to 200 kHz.

Gradually the Kirlians' activity began to attract attention from professional scientists. Kirlian made controversial claims that the image he was studying might be compared with the human aura. An experiment advanced as evidence of energy fields generated by living entities involves taking Kirlian contact photographs of a picked leaf at set periods, its gradual withering being said to correspond with a decline in the strength of the aura. The Kirlians made many photographs of the leaves of various plants; by 1949, it was determined that Kirlian photography could detect incipient plant disease that was not otherwise detectable. In the same year, the Kirlians received a Soviet patent on their basic device, "a method of photographing by means of high-frequency currents." Experimenting further upon themselves, the Kirlians acquired the first results showing that Kirlian photography could provide an index of a person's physical health, and could illuminate the acupuncture points of the human body.

=== Torn leaf experiment ===
A typical demonstration used as evidence for the existence of these energy fields involved taking Kirlian photographs of a picked leaf at set intervals. The gradual withering of the leaf was thought to correspond with a decline in the strength of the aura. In some experiments, if a section of a leaf was torn away after the first photograph, a faint image of the missing section would sometimes remain when a second photograph was taken. If the imaging surface is cleaned of contaminants and residual moisture before the second image is taken, then no image of the missing section would appear.

The living aura theory is at least partially repudiated by demonstrating that leaf moisture content has a pronounced effect on the electric discharge coronas; more moisture creates larger, more dynamic corona discharges. As the leaf dehydrates, the coronas will naturally decrease in variability and intensity. As a result, the changing water content of the leaf can affect the so-called Kirlian aura. Kirlian's experiments did not provide evidence for an energy field other than the electric fields produced by chemical processes, and the streaming process of coronal discharges.

The coronal discharges identified as Kirlian auras are the result of stochastic electric ionization processes, and are greatly affected by many factors, including the voltage and frequency of the stimulus, the pressure with which a person or object touches the imaging surface, the local humidity around the object being imaged, how well grounded the person or object is, and other local factors affecting the conductivity of the person or object being imaged. Oils, sweat, bacteria, and other ionizing contaminants found on living tissues can also affect the resulting images.

== Widespread recognition ==
It was not until the early 1960s, however, that the Kirlians' efforts attracted widespread recognition and official support, once popular journalists wrote a series of newspaper and magazine articles about Kirlian photography. The Kirlians were awarded a pension and were provided with a pleasant new apartment and a well-equipped laboratory in Krasnodar. Their first scientific paper on Kirlian photography was published in 1961, in the (Russian) Journal of Scientific and Applied Photography. Scientific institutions around the Soviet Union were set to work on Kirlian photography in 1962.

The first appearance in the US is unknown, but an educational film about Kirlian photography and energy emissions from living things was seen in a Southern California elementary school about 1964.

He was a recipient of the title Honored Inventor of the RSFSR.

== Death ==
He died in 1978 in Krasnodar, USSR.

== In popular culture ==
In Michael Scott's novel The Alchemyst, the protagonist, Nicholas Flamel, notes that the aura has been photographed by the Kirlians.

The IDM artist Benn Jordan, aka "The Flashbulb", wrote a string of songs on various albums that refer to Kirlian in the title.

Kirlian photography plays a major part in Kerryn Offord's Feng Shui for the Soul, in Grantville Gazette VI.
