= Kirlian photography =

Techniques for imaging corona discharges

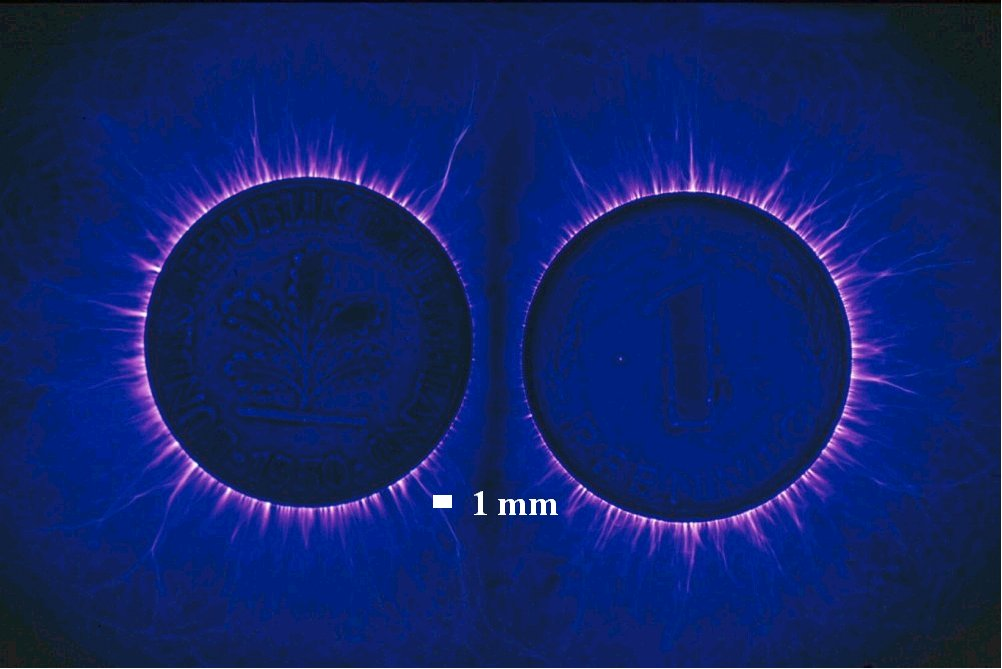
Kirlian photograph of two coins

Kirlian photography is a collection of photographic techniques used to capture the phenomenon of electrical coronal discharges. It is named after Soviet inventor and researcher of Armenian descent Semyon Kirlian, who, in 1939, accidentally discovered that if an object on a photographic plate is connected to a high-voltage source, an image is produced on the photographic plate. The technique has been variously known as electrography, electrophotography, corona(l) discharge photography (CDP), bioelectrography, gas discharge visualization (GDV), electrophotonic imaging (EPI), and, in Russian literature, Kirlianography.

Kirlian photography has been the subject of scientific research, parapsychology research, and art. Paranormal claims have been made about Kirlian photography, but these claims are rejected by the scientific community. To a large extent, it has been used in alternative medicine research.

== History ==
In 1889, Czech Bartoloměj Navrátil coined the word "electrography". Seven years later in 1896, a French experimenter, Hippolyte Baraduc, created electrographs of hands and leaves.

In 1898, Polish-Belarusian engineer Jakub Jodko-Narkiewicz (Note: Alternatively transliterated Narkevich-Yodko. It is spelled Narkevich-Todko in some sources; In Russian: Наркевич-Йодко. Some sources state that he was Polish, rendering his name Jacob Jodko-Narkiewicz) demonstrated electrography at the fifth exhibition of the Russian Technical Society.

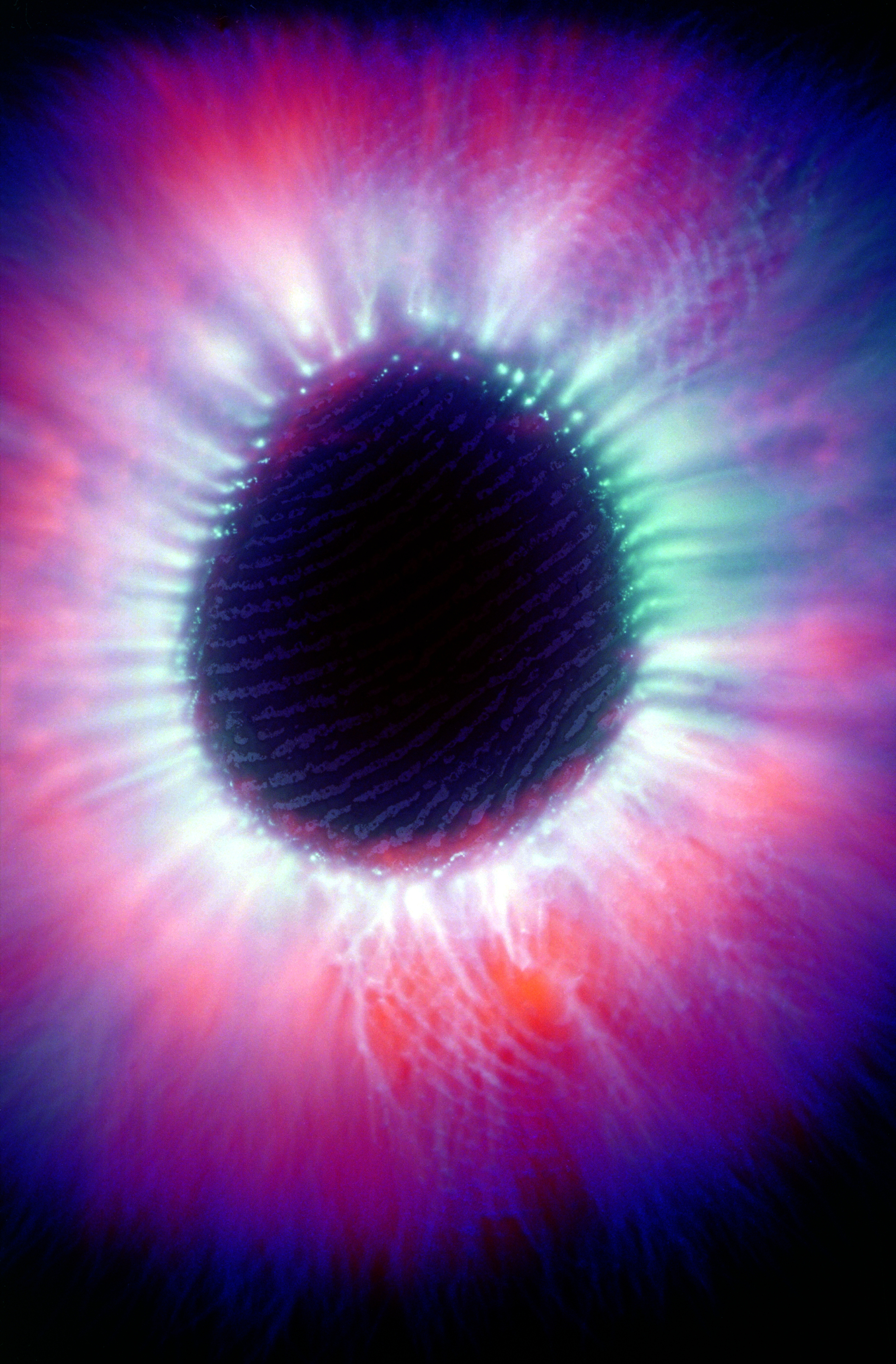
Kirlian photograph of a fingertip, 1989

In 1939, two Czechs, S. Pratt and J. Schlemmer, published photographs showing a glow around leaves. The same year, Soviet electrical engineer Semyon Kirlian and his wife Valentina developed Kirlian photography after observing a patient in Krasnodar Hospital who was receiving medical treatment from a high-frequency electrical generator. They had noticed that when the electrodes were brought near the patient's skin, there was a glow similar to that of a neon discharge tube.

The Kirlians conducted experiments in which photographic film was placed on top of a conducting plate, and another conductor was attached to a hand, a leaf or other plant material. The conductors were energized by a high-frequency high-voltage power source, producing photographic images typically showing a silhouette of the object surrounded by an aura of light.

In 1958, the Kirlians reported the results of their experiments for the first time. Their work was virtually unknown until 1970, when two Americans, Lynn Schroeder and Sheila Ostrander, published a book, Psychic Discoveries Behind the Iron Curtain. High-voltage electrophotography soon became known to the general public as Kirlian photography. Although little interest was generated among western scientists, Russians held a conference on the subject in 1972 at Kazakh State University.

Kirlian photography was used in the former Eastern Bloc in the 1970s. The corona discharge glow at the surface of an object subjected to a high-voltage electrical field was referred to as a "Kirlian aura" in Russia and Eastern Europe. In 1975, Soviet scientist Victor Adamenko wrote a dissertation titled Research of the structure of High-frequency electric discharge (Kirlian effect) images. Scientific study of what the researchers called the Kirlian effect was conducted by Victor Inyushin at Kazakh State University.

Early in the 1970s, Thelma Moss and Kendall Johnson at the Center for Health Sciences at UCLA conducted extensive research into Kirlian photography. Moss led an independent and unsupported parapsychology laboratory that was shut down by the university in 1979.

== Overview ==
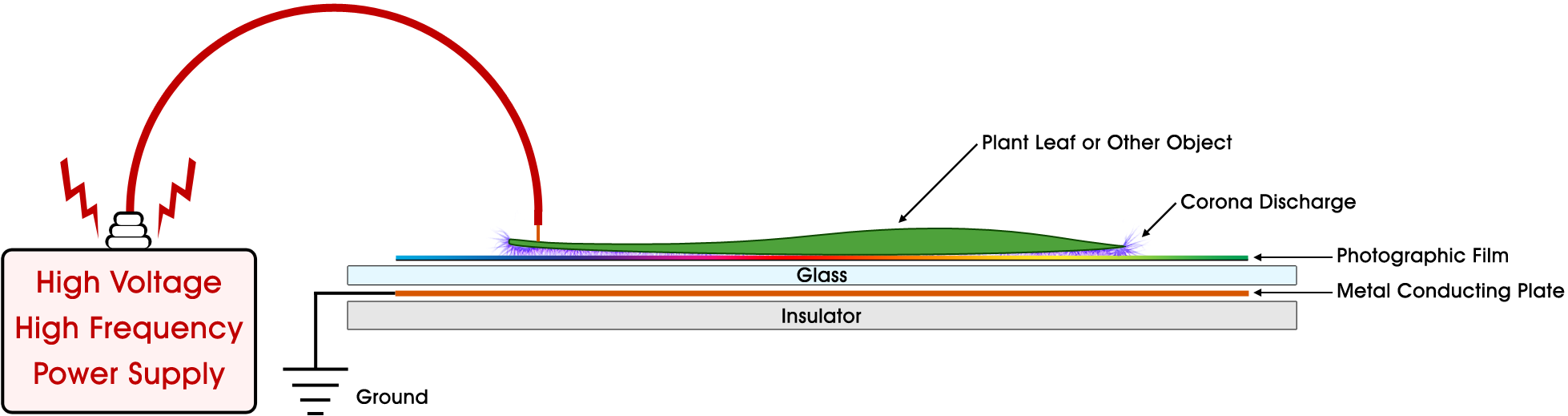
Typical Kirlian photography setup (cross-section)

Kirlian Discharge Tests on a metal washer

Kirlian photograph of a fingertip

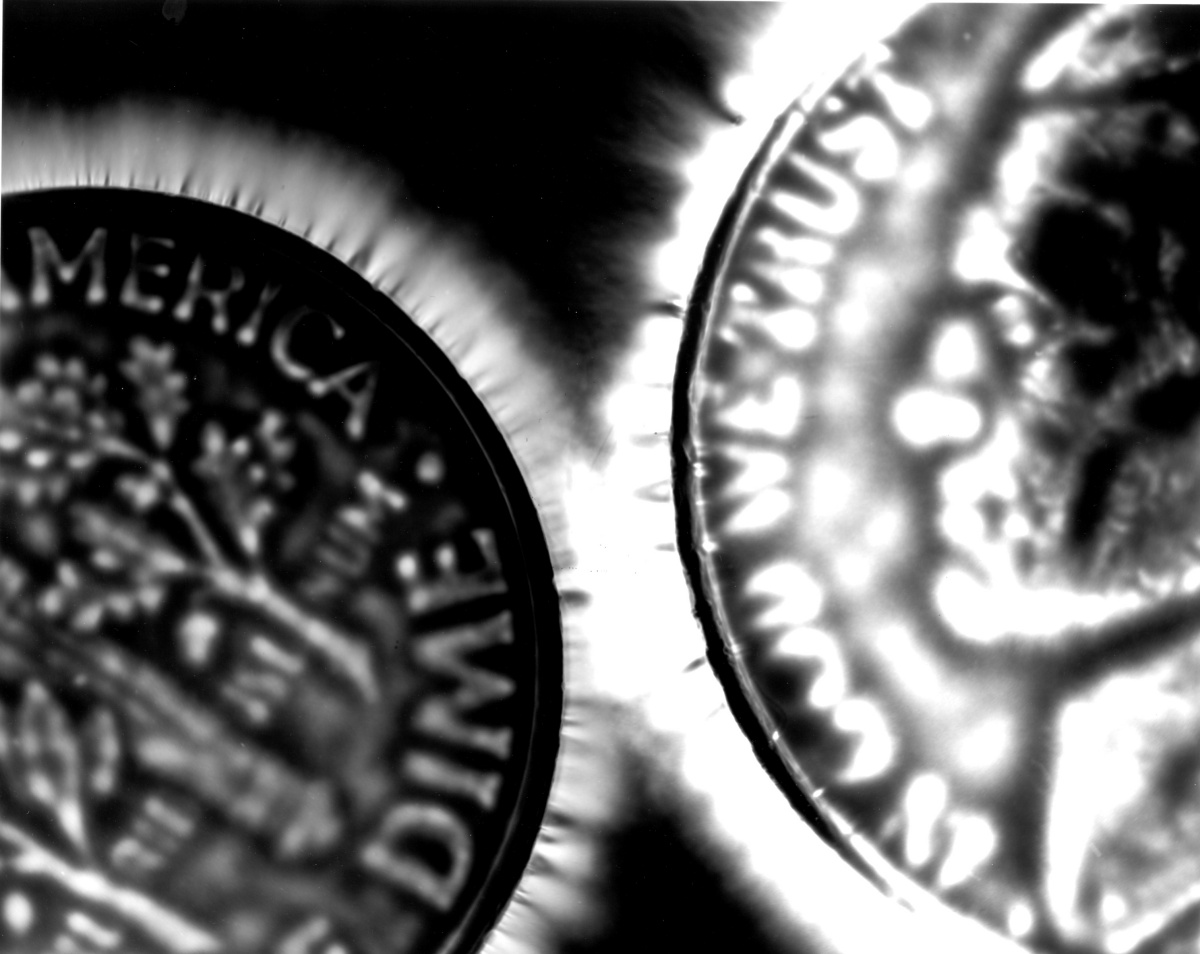
Kirlian photograph of two coins

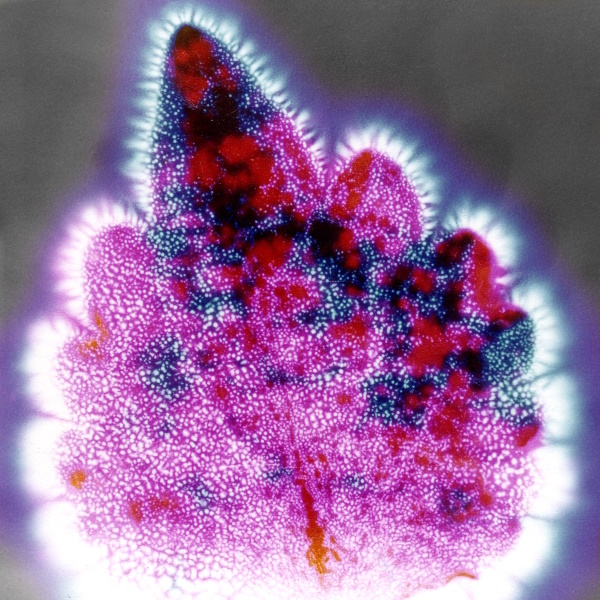
Kirlian photograph of a Coleus leaf

Kirlian photography is a technique for creating contact print photographs using high voltage. The process entails placing sheet photographic film on top of a metal discharge plate. The object to be photographed is then placed directly on top of the film. High voltage current is momentarily applied to the object, thus creating an exposure. The corona discharge between the object and the plate due to high-voltage is captured by the film. The developed film results in a Kirlian photograph of the object.

Color photographic film is calibrated to produce faithful colors when exposed to normal light. Corona discharges can interact with minute variations in the different layers of dye used in the film, resulting in a wide variety of colors depending on the local intensity of the discharge. Film and digital imaging techniques also record light produced by photons emitted during corona discharge (see Mechanism of corona discharge).

Photographs of inanimate objects such as coins, keys and leaves can be made more effectively by grounding the object to the earth, a cold water pipe or to the opposite side (polarity) of the high-voltage source. Grounding the object creates a stronger corona discharge.

Kirlian photography does not require the use of a camera or a lens because it is a contact print process. It is possible to use a transparent electrode in place of the high-voltage discharge plate, for capturing the resulting corona discharge with a standard photo or video camera.

Visual artists such as Robert Buelteman, Ted Hiebert, and Dick Lane have used Kirlian photography to produce artistic images of a variety of subjects.

== Research ==
Kirlian photography has been a subject of scientific research, parapsychology research and pseudoscientific claims.

=== Scientific research ===
Results of scientific experiments published in 1976 involving Kirlian photography of living tissue (human finger tips) showed that most of the variations in corona discharge streamer length, density, curvature, and color can be accounted for by the moisture content on the surface of and within the living tissue.

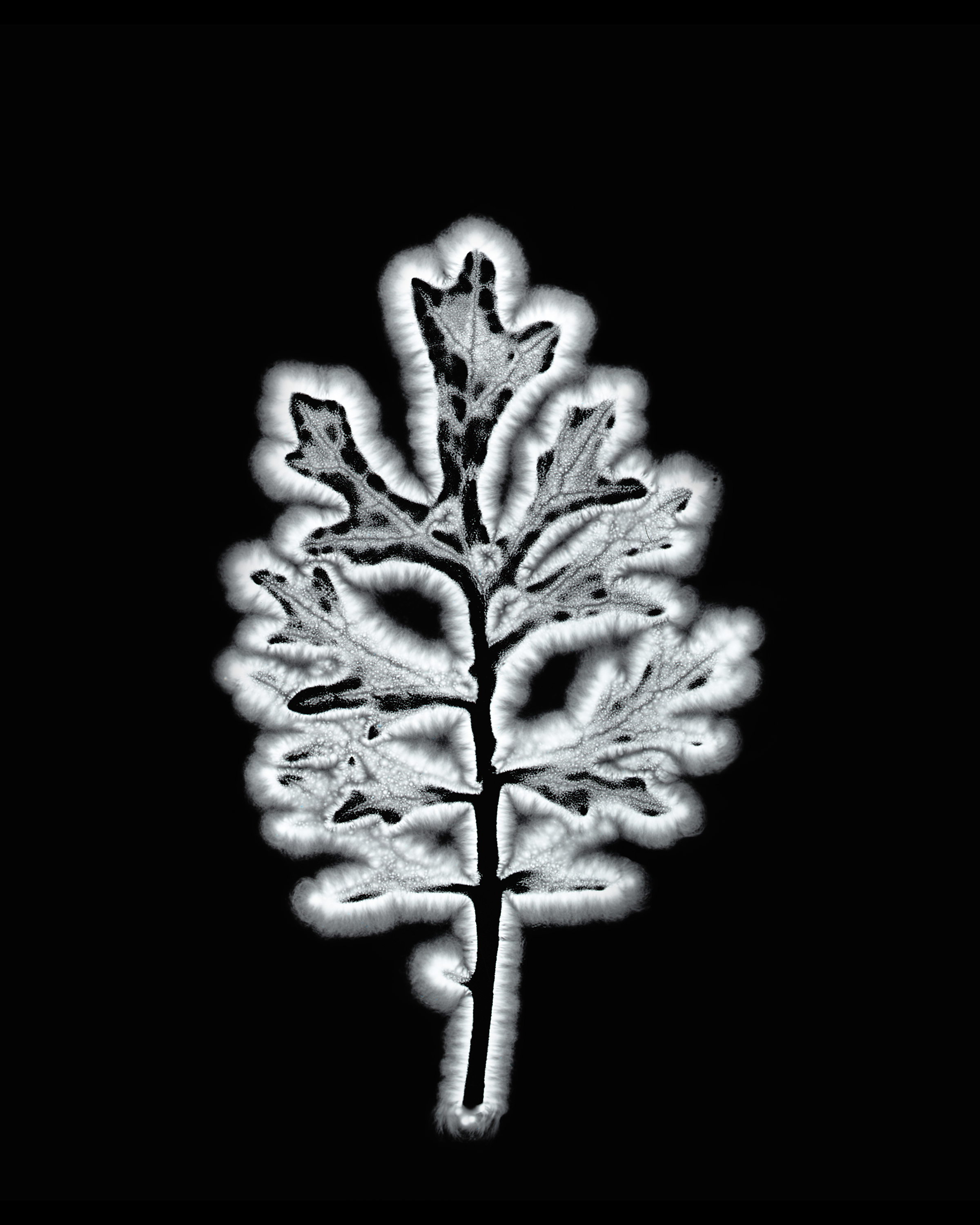
Kirlian photograph of a dusty leaf

University of Adelaide engineer George Karolyi likewise concluded that Kirlian images are produced by corona discharge, reporting that the spectrum of the discharge light was the same for an inanimate object such as a coin as for a human finger.

Konstantin Korotkov developed a technique similar to Kirlian photography called "gas discharge visualization" (GDV). Korotkov's GDV camera system consists of hardware and software to directly record, process and interpret GDV images with a computer. Korotkov promotes the device and research in a medical context. Izabela Ciesielska at the Institute of Architecture of Textiles in Poland used Korotkov's GDV camera to evaluate the effects of human contact with various textiles on biological factors such as heart rate and blood pressure, as well as corona discharge images. The experiments captured corona discharge images of subjects' fingertips while the subjects wore sleeves of various natural and synthetic materials on their forearms. The results failed to establish a relationship between human contact with the textiles and the corona discharge images and were considered inconclusive.

=== Parapsychology research ===
In 1968, Thelma Moss, a psychology professor, headed University of California, Los Angeles (UCLA)'s Neuropsychiatric Institute (NPI), which was later renamed the Semel Institute. The NPI had a laboratory dedicated to parapsychology research and staffed mostly with volunteers. The lab was unfunded, unsanctioned and eventually shut down by the university. Toward the end of her tenure at UCLA, Moss became interested in Kirlian photography, a technique that supposedly measured the "auras" of a living being. According to Kerry Gaynor, one of her former research assistants, "many felt Kirlian photography's effects were just a natural occurrence."

Paranormal claims of Kirlian photography have not been observed or replicated in experiments by the scientific community. The physiologist Gordon Stein has written that Kirlian photography is a hoax that has "nothing to do with health, vitality, or mood of a subject photographed."

=== Claims ===
Kirlian believed that images created by Kirlian photography might depict a conjectural energy field, or aura, thought, by some, to surround living things. Kirlian and his wife were convinced that their images showed a life force or energy field that reflected the physical and emotional states of their living subjects. They thought that these images could be used to diagnose illnesses. In 1961, they published their first article on the subject in the Russian Journal of Scientific and Applied Photography. Kirlian's claims were embraced by energy treatments practitioners.

==== Torn leaf experiment ====
A typical demonstration used as evidence for the existence of these energy fields involved taking Kirlian photographs of a picked leaf at set intervals. The gradual withering of the leaf was thought to correspond with a decline in the strength of the aura. In some experiments, if a section of a leaf was torn away after the first photograph, a faint image of the missing section sometimes remains when a second photograph was taken. However, if the imaging surface is cleaned of contaminants and residual moisture before the second image is taken, then no image of the missing section will appear.

The living aura theory is at least partially repudiated by demonstrating that leaf moisture content has a pronounced effect on the electric discharge coronas; more moisture creates larger corona discharges. As the leaf dehydrates, the coronas will naturally decrease in variability and intensity. As a result, the changing water content of the leaf can affect the so-called Kirlian aura. Kirlian's experiments did not provide evidence for an energy field other than the electric fields produced by chemical processes and the streaming process of coronal discharges.

The coronal discharges identified as Kirlian auras are the result of stochastic electric ionization processes and are greatly affected by many factors, including the voltage and frequency of the stimulus, the pressure with which a person or object touches the imaging surface, the local humidity around the object being imaged, how well grounded the person or object is, and other local factors affecting the conductivity of the person or object being imaged. Oils, sweat, bacteria, and other ionizing contaminants found on living tissues can also affect the resulting images.

==== Qi ====
Scientists such as Beverly Rubik have explored the idea of a human biofield using Kirlian photography research, attempting to explain the Chinese discipline of Qigong. Qigong teaches that there is a vitalistic energy called qi (or chi) that permeates all living things.

Rubik's experiments relied on Konstantin Korotkov's GDV device to produce images, which were thought to visualize these qi biofields in chronically ill patients. Rubik acknowledges that the small sample size in her experiments "was too small to permit a meaningful statistical analysis". Claims that these energies can be captured by special photographic equipment are criticized by skeptics.

== In popular culture ==
Kirlian photography has appeared as a fictional element in numerous books, films, television series, and media productions, including the 1975 film The Kirlian Force, re-released under the more sensational title Psychic Killer. Kirlian photographs have been used as visual components in various media, such as the sleeve of George Harrison's 1973 album Living in the Material World, which features Kirlian photographs of his hand holding a Hindu medallion on the front sleeve and American coins on the back, shot at Thelma Moss's UCLA parapsychology laboratory.

The rock group King Crimson traveled to Lamar University in Beaumont, Texas during their Summer 1974 US tour to have their hands undergo Kirlian photography. According to Dr. Joseph Pizzo, who supervised the photography, this was the first time to his knowledge that a Kirlian photograph had ever been taken of an entire hand or face. The photograph of bassist John Wetton's hand was used for the back cover of King Crimson's posthumous 1975 live album USA.

"Multiplanar Kirlian emanations" are referenced in the 1989 film Ghostbusters II, during a scene where Ray Stantz and Egon Spengler are conducting a spectral analysis of photographs taken of a portrait painting, which is possessed by the malevolent spirit of medieval tyrant Vigo the Carpathian.

The artwork of David Bowie's 1997 album Earthling has reproductions of Kirlian photographs taken by Bowie. The photographs, which show a crucifix Bowie wore around his neck and the imprint of his "forefinger" tip, date to April 1975 when Bowie was living in Los Angeles and fascinated with the paranormal. The photographs were taken before consuming cocaine and 30 minutes afterwards. The after photograph apparently shows a substantial increase in the "aura" around the crucifix and forefinger.

The Cluster novels by science fiction author Piers Anthony uses the concept of the Kirlian Aura as a way to transfer a person's personality into another body, even an alien body, across light years. The book The Anarchistic Colossus (1977) by A. E. van Vogt involves an anarchistic society controlled by ‘Kirlian computers’.

The opening credits during the first seven seasons of the television series The X-Files shows a Kirlian image of a left human hand. The image appears as the 11th clip in the introductory video montage and is formed by a bluish coronal discharge as the primary outline, with only the proximal phalange of the index finger shown cryptically in red. A human silhouette, in white, seemingly falls towards the hand. Additionally, Kirlian photography is explored deeper as a plot point in the twelfth episode of the show's fourth season, "Leonard Betts".

The Italian electronic darkwave band Kirlian Camera was named after the device used for Kirlian photography.

British industrial band Cabaret Voltaire's first album Mix-Up features a track called Kirlian Photograph.

== See also ==
- Aura (paranormal) § Aura photography
- Bioelectromagnetism
- Cherenkov radiation § Medical imaging of radioisotopes and external beam radiotherapy
- L-field
- List of topics characterized as pseudoscience
- Magnetic particle inspection (Magnaflux)
- Thoughtography
- Timeline of Russian innovation
