= Energy field disturbance =

Pseudoscientific concept rooted in alternative medicine

Energy field disturbance is a pseudoscientific concept rooted in alternative medicine. Supporters of this concept believe it concerns the disruptance of a metaphysical biofield that permeates the body, resulting in poor emotional or physiological health. This concept is often related to therapeutic touch.

== NANDA diagnosis and controversy ==
The North American Nursing Diagnosis Association (NANDA) previously recognized the diagnosis "Disturbed Energy Field" in 1994, prior to implementation of a rule requiring a minimum requirement by evidence in the literature prior to accepting a new diagnosis. Later, NANDA has reported it received feedback questioning the validity of the diagnosis, including criticism from skeptic James Randi. Based on this feedback, NANDA said it would reevaluate this diagnosis based on current scientific evidence.

"Disturbed Energy Field" was removed from the NANDA taxonomy in the 10th edition of Nursing Diagnoses: Definitions & Classification 2015-2017, with the explanation that "...all literature support currently provided for this diagnosis is regarding intervention rather than for the nursing diagnosis itself" (p. 13).

In the 11th edition of NANDA International Nursing Diagnoses: Definitions & Classification, 2018-2020, the diagnosis returned under the name of "Imbalanced energy field", it is inside Domain 4, Class 3.

== Reception ==
The alleged benefits of therapeutic touch are not supported by any scientific evidence.

== See also ==
- Aura (paranormal)
- Energy medicine
- Orgone
- Subtle body
- List of topics characterized as pseudoscience
