= Joseph Grasset =

French neurologist (1849–1918)

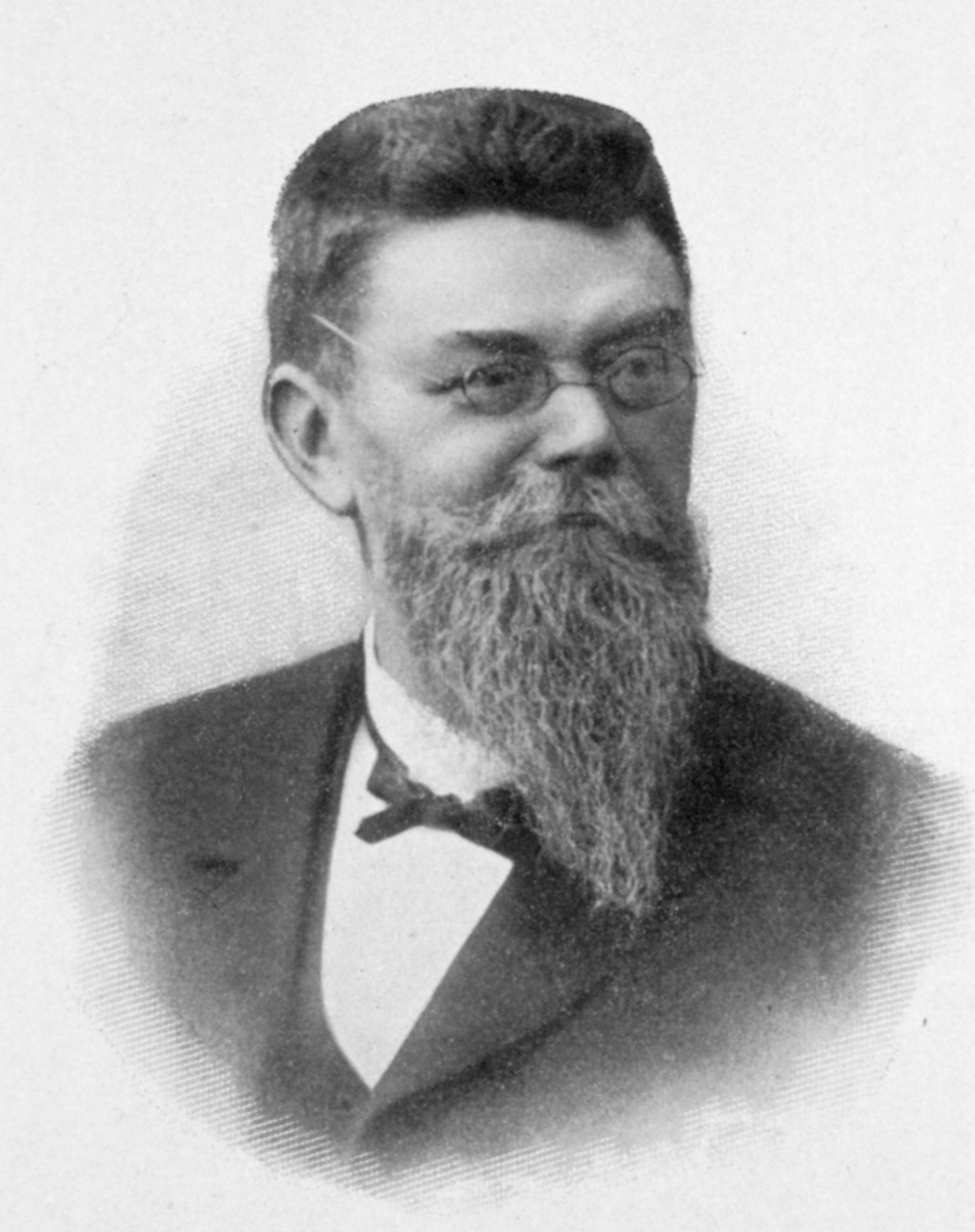
Joseph Grasset

Joseph Grasset (18 March 1849 – 7 July 1918), was a French neurologist and parapsychological investigator, born in Montpellier.

He received his medical degree (1873) in Montpellier, where in 1881 he became a professor of therapy. In 1886, he attained the chair of clinical medicine, and in 1909 was appointed chair of general pathology.

Grasset was involved in every aspect of internal medicine, but his primary interest concerned diseases of the nervous system. His name is associated with the "Grasset law", 'a condition where a patient with hemiparesis lying on his back can raise either leg separately, but is unable to raise both legs together.'^{:649} This phenomenon is explained in his 1899 treatise, Diagnostic des maladies de la moëlle.

He conducted studies in the field of psychiatry, publishing the book Demi-fous et Demi-responsables (Semi-Insane and the Semi-Responsible) in 1907, and also researched the paranormal, publishing works with titles such as Le spiritisme devant la science (1904) and L’occultisme hier et aujourd'hui (1907).

His book L’occultisme hier et aujourd'hui was translated into English as The Marvels Beyond Science in 1910. Grasset took a psychological approach to psychical research and attributed mediumship to deliberate trickery or unconscious suggestion.

== Selected publications ==
- The Diagnosis of Diseases of the Cord (1901)
- The Semi-Insane and the Semi-Responsible (1907)
- The Marvels Beyond Science (1910)
