= Eupione =

Names
- Other names Eupion

Identifiers
| ChemSpider | none |
| UNII | 40W0G99GIW |

Properties
| Chemical formula | C_{5}H_{12} |
| Appearance | Oily, odourless, colourless |
| Melting point | −15.5 °C; 4.0 °F; 257.6 K Dunglison 1838 |
| Boiling point | 170.6 °C; 339.0 °F; 443.7 K Dunglison 1838 |
| Solubility in water | Insoluble in water |
| Solubility | 100 parts of eupione in 33 parts of absolute alcohol at 290.3 K |
- Except where otherwise noted, data are given for materials in their standard state (at 25 °C [77 °F], 100 kPa). Infobox references

Eupione, or eupion, is a hydrocarbon mixture of the paraffin series, probably a pentane, C_{5}H_{12}, discovered by Carl Reichenbach in wood tar. It is also formed in the destructive distillation of many substances, as wood, coal, caoutchouc, bones, resin and the fixed oils. It is a colorless, highly volatile and flammable liquid, having at 20 °C a specific gravity of 0.65.
