= Takeuchi documents =

Purportedly ancient Japanese documents making incredulous claims

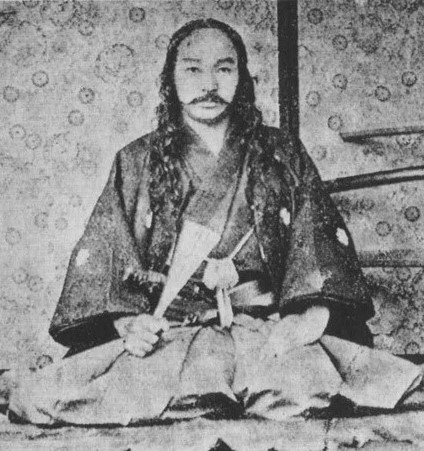
Kyomaro Takeuchi, c. 1912

The Takeuchi documents (Japanese: 竹内文書, Hepburn: Takeuchi monjo), also known as the Takeuchi scrolls or the Takeuchi monjo, are a collection of texts presented in 1935 by Kyōmaro Takeuchi, who claimed they were ancient Japanese records predating conventional accounts of Japanese history.

The documents describe an alternative global history centered on Japan, including extended imperial genealogies and narratives involving figures such as Moses and Jesus. The documents are written in so-called "Divine Characters," manuscripts supposedly translated into a mixture of Chinese characters and katakana by Sukune Takeuchi's grandson, Heguri no Matori. They were supposedly written at imperial command of Emperor Buretsu.

Mainstream historians and linguists regard the documents as modern forgeries or pseudohistorical texts, citing anachronistic language, implausible chronology, and the absence of verifiable provenance. Despite this scholarly consensus, the documents have influenced certain fringe religious movements and continue to attract adherents.

== Background ==
The Takeuchi documents were made public in the early Shōwa period, a time marked by heightened interest in Shinto revivalism, national origins, and alternative historical narratives. Kyōmaro Takeuchi asserted that the documents had been preserved within his family for generations and were written in an ancient script predating classical Japanese writing systems. No credible evidence has been produced to substantiate these claims, and no independent verification of the documents’ existence prior to the 20th century has been established.

== Claims ==
The Takeuchi documents refer to the current imperial dynasty, which began with Emperor Jimmu, as the "Kamu Yamatocho," and state that before this there were the "25 generations of the Joko era" (or "25 generations of the imperial line"), followed by the "73 generations of the Aezucho era" (the 73rd emperor being Emperor Jimmu), and even before that there were the "7 generations of Tenjin era."

Incidentally, the 21st Emperor of the Joko period was called "Izanagi Shinko Ame no Tsuhitsu Tenno" and is said to be the same as Izanagi (Izanagi in the Kojiki and Izanagi in the Nihon Shoki), and one of his two children was "Tsukimukatsuhikotsukiyumi no Mikoto also known as Susanoo no Mikoto," or Tsukuyomi-no-Mikoto (Tsukuyomi in the Kojiki and Tsukiyomi in the Nihon Shoki), who is said to be another name for Susanoo-no-Mikoto (Susanoo and Susanoo in the Nihon Shoki, Takehaya Susanoo and Susanoo in the Kojiki).

There is a document called "The Testament of Isukiris Christmas (believed to be Jesus Christ)" which claims "Isukiris Christmas. God of Fortune. Hachinohe Taro Sky God. A Message to the Five Colored People," and according to it, he came to Japan without dying on the cross; rather it is recorded that his younger brother Isukiri was executed on the hill of Golgotha. Jesus came to Japan by way of Siberia to Hachinohe in Mutsu Province. He married a woman named Miyuko and then had three daughters. The eldest married into the Sawaguchi family. There are still descendants in the area of Shingō who have non-Asian features and claim descent from Jesus. Jesus lived to be 106 years old. In early August 1935, Komaru Takeuchi discovered the Toraizuka (which Takeuchi asked the village mayor to write) in Torai Village (now Shingō Village) in Aomori Prefecture, and it is believed to be the tomb of "Isukiris Christmas," i.e., the tomb of Christ. The Ten Commandments of Moses are actually the Formal Ten Commandments, and the stone with the original text, including the Hidden Ten Commandments and the True Ten Commandments, is owned by Imperial Ancestors and Grand Shrine of Amatsukyo as a sacred treasure, and was bestowed upon Moses by the Emperor when he visited Japan, and Moses' tomb is located in Hōdatsushimizu, Ishikawa. All of the world's great religious leaders, including Buddha, are said to have come to Japan and served the Emperor.

There are five types of people in the world:

- yellow people (Kihito, Asians including Japanese) - associated with the Imperial or ruling lineages; linked to wisdom, spirituality, or cultural refinement
- red people (Akahito, seen in some Native Americans and Jews) - associated with divine or semi-divine people; linked to courage, vitality, or leadership qualities
- blue people (Aohito, pale skin; currently there are almost no purebreds) - associated with foreigners or outsiders; link to mystery, otherness, or innovation
- black people (Kurohito, indigenous peoples of India and Africans) - associated with ordinary people or laboring classes; linked to groundedness, endurance, or practical skills
- white people (Shirohito, Europeans with pale skin and platinum or blonde hair) - associated with sages, intellectuals, or ritual specialists; linked to purity or spiritual enlightenment

Koso Kotai Jingu Shrine is the center of the entire world. (Note: The current shrine in Ibaraki Prefecture is a relocated shrine).

Over 3,000 years ago, during the reign of the second Emperor of the Joko period, 16 brothers and sisters were scattered across the world, and their names remain as place names to this day. Among them are names like "Johannesburg," "Boston," and "New York," but these cities were founded in a fairly recent era.

The origin of "Momotarō" is said to be about 3,000 years ago, during the reign of the 64th dynasty of the Fuai dynasty, when 31 princes and 43 princesses went on a tour and their leader, Bankoku Junchihiko no Mikoto, subdued foreign enemies with his wisdom, bravery and great strength.

During the reign of Emperor Kamitariwake Toyosuki, the 69th emperor of the Fukazu dynasty, Miyoi and Tamiara collapsed (the characters Miyoi and Tamiara first appeared in the October 1940 volume of Heavenly Leader Emperor's Genealogy Treasure Scroll, Volumes 1 and 2, written by Kodama Tenmin), and there are descriptions that are reminiscent of lost continent of Mu (first introduced in Japan in the June 1938 issue of the magazine Shin Nippon (edited by Nakazato Yoshimi) in the article "The Collapsed Continent of Mu Country") and the continent of Atlantis.

There is a description of Hihiirokane, and it is also stated that the iron sword that is said to have been passed down along with the document was made by Hihiirokane.

The Hane Ascending Airport in the Kureha Hills in Toyama Prefecture (Toyama Plain) was exclusively for domestic flights within Japan, meaning it was a domestic airport, while the Hane Airport in Hakui, Ishikawa Prefecture, was for international flights to travel around the world. It is said that in ancient times there were flying ships and the emperor traveled around the world on them.

Tateyama in Toyama Prefecture is home to an ancient Japanese pyramid called Togariyama (559 m above sea level), where an unusually high number of UFO sightings have occurred. The caption for the cover photo in the "History of the World in the Age of the Gods" reads, "Mount Tongari is the site of the temple of the 24th Emperor of the Ancient World, Amenoniniginosumera-mikoto ." This is the temple "Ametotsuchihiramituto," from which the emperor is said to have boarded a "heavenly floating boat" (UFO) and flown around the world.

== Criticism and believers ==
=== Yamazaki Tetsumaru ===
After reading Misao Kawaura's introductory article on the Takeuchi documents, "Regarding the Imperial Mausoleum of Emperor Chokei", Yamazaki Tetsumaru criticized the documents in "Regarding the Records of the Takeuchi Family".

=== Kokichi Kano ===
In 1935, historian and literature professor Kokichi Kano was asked by the Nihon Iji Shimpo to examine five out of seven documents and concluded that they were forgeries. The photographs he examined were of the following five documents:

- "The Origin of Chokeidai Shrine"
- " Authentic Writings of Emperor Chokei "
- " Authentic writing by Emperor Godaigo "
- "The Imperial Lineage of the Emperor of Japan, Ancient and Ancient Times, Volume of the Characters of the Divine Age, Written by Minister Ki, Takeuchi Heiguri, and Madori no Sukune"
- "The Ancient Japanese Book of the Ancient Age of the Gods"

Kano had been asked to examine ancient documents photographed by Tenshinkyo members in May 1928, but he declined the request at the time. As more in the military began to accept Tenshinkyo's claims, he was surprised by its influence and decided to examine the documents in 1935 and pronounced them modern forgeries. In 1936, Kano published “Criticism of the Ancient Documents of the Amatsukyo Sect” in the June issue of Shiso (Iwanami Shoten) that year, proving that the documents were forgeries. In 1942, Kano appeared in court as a witness for the prosecution, along with linguist Shinkichi Hashimoto.

=== Koso Kotai Jingu Shrine ===
There are some people who believe the documents are real. The Koso Kotai Jingu Shrine in Ibaraki Prefecture claims to keep the documents and sacred treasures, which they claim can not be told to those outside the family, and that the documents are only notes of oral transmissions.

=== Emperor Kumazawa ===
During the 1947 election, Kumazawa Hiromichi, who called himself Emperor Kumazawa of the Southern Court, claimed that the Takeuchi documents had been stolen along with other items and treasures handed down by Emperor Shinmasa. This was based on the claim made by Kumazawa's supporter, Yoshida Chozo, that the documents had been stolen from Kofuku-ji Temple (later Kanpuku-ji Temple, a Southern Court temple) in Katsurao, Fukushima, by the komusō monk Saito Jikkyo in the mid-Meiji era, and that Komaru Takeuchi had purchased them from an antique dealer in 1920.

== Incidents surrounding Amatsukyo ==
- From December 7th to 19th, 1930, the Tokyo Nichi Nichi Shimbun carried critical articles. The Metropolitan Police Department investigated Takeuchi Kyoma, Maeda Tsunezo, and Takabatake Yasutoshi on suspicion of fraud . No charges were filed.
- In 1932, the Ministry of Home Affairs Special Higher Police arrested Koma Takeuchi, and in June of the same year, he was banned from viewing the sacred treasures and the shrine's torii gate was removed due to his disrespectful behavior.
- On December 28, 1935, the sacred treasures were entrusted by Hata Shinji to Matsuda Tsuneta, director of the Yushukan Museum at Yasukuni Shrine in Tokyo.
- On the morning of February 13, 1936, Kyomaro Takeuchi (who was detained by Mito police until July 7 , 1937) and Yoshida Kanekichi, owner of a hotel called Isoharakan, were arrested in Isohara Town, Taga County, Ibaraki Prefecture, on suspicion of Lèse-majesté, forged document use, and fraud. On April 17 of the same year, the case was sent to the prosecutor's office, and on the 30th of the same month, Kyomaro Takeuchi signed a letter of trust to transfer the sacred treasures to the Mito District Court.
- On December 11, 1937, of the 15 arrested, only Yoshimaro Takeuchi was indicted on charges of lèse majesté.
- On March 16, 1942, he was found guilty of lèse majesté in the first trial. He appealed. The lawyers representing the appellant were Shiroji Tatai, Masami Miyamoto, and special counsel Somei Uzawa (later the head of the Japanese defense team at the International Military Tribunal for the Far East).
- On December 12, 1944, the Daishinin (present-day Supreme Court ) concluded its trial with a not guilty verdict. The verdict stated that "this issue is a religious matter beyond the jurisdiction of the court" and that "there was simply insufficient evidence" and declared the defendant not guilty.
- In January 1950, the General Headquarters of the Supreme Commander for the Allied Powers (GHQ/SCAP) ordered the Amatsukyo to be disbanded.

== Burning and suspicion ==
During this trial, Koso Kotai Jingu Shrine submitted a "Statement of Intent for Appeal in the Case of Disrespect for the Shrine Shrines," along with approximately 4,000 Takeuchi documents, including sacred treasures, and reports on on-site investigations of historical sites. Although the defendants were found not guilty, the submitted documents were not returned immediately after the trial ended, and the originals, including "Kibitsuhiko no Meiheiho no Maki," were reportedly destroyed in the Tokyo air raids during the World War II. After the war, Yoshimiya Takeuchi, the son of Takemaro, passed down the copies.

== Influence ==
- Historian Ryoichi Hasegawa points out the influence of the sunken continent theory of James Churchward and others who argued for the existence of the continent of Mu.
- It influenced the new religion, Mahikari movement, founded by Kōtama Okada.
- Asahara Shoko, founder of Aum Shinrikyo, came across the Takeuchi documents, which led him to establish the idea of Armageddon as an apocalyptic ideology. In June 1985, Asahara traveled to Mount Goyo in Iwate Prefecture to verify Sakai Katsugun's theory of the Japanese pyramids, which was based on the Takeuchi documents. He reported in the November 1985 issue of the magazine Mu that he had heard from a local elder that Sakai had received a divine revelation of Armageddon at the summit of Mount Goyo, that Armageddon would occur at the end of the 20th century, only a "divine race" would survive, and a leader different from the Emperor would emerge from Japan.
