= Divine light (disambiguation) =

Divine light is an aspect of divine presence perceived or represented as light.

Divine light may also refer to:

- Uncreated Light, the light revealed on Mount Tabor at the Transfiguration of Jesus
- Divine Light Mission, a Hindu new religious movement
- Emissaries of Divine Light, an American new religious movement
- World Divine Light, a Japanese new religion belonging to the Mahikari movement
- Johrei, a practice of transmitting divine light in various Japanese new religions

== See also ==
- Light of God (disambiguation)
- Divine Radiance (album), 2001 album by Tisziji Muñoz
