= Hikaru Museum =

Museum in Takayama, Japan

Coordinates: 36°9′21.5″N 137°14′3.4″E

Hikaru Museum 光記念館
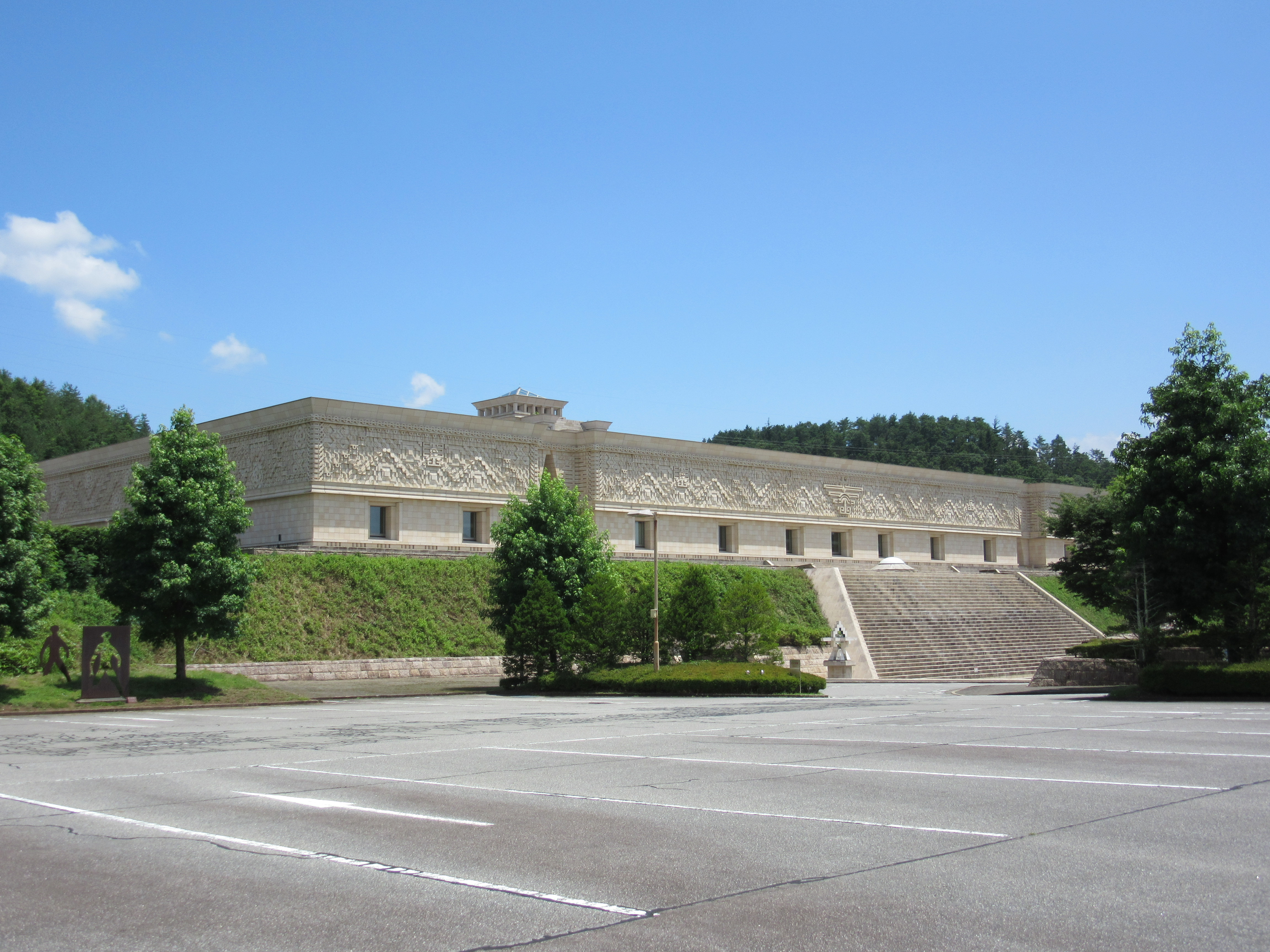
- Established: April 8, 1999
- Location: 175 Nakayama-chō, Takayama; Gifu Prefecture, Japan 506-0051
- Public transit access: Takayama Main Line
- Website: h-am.jp

Hikaru Museum (光記念館, Hikaru Kinenkan) is a museum in Takayama, Gifu Prefecture, Japan, comprising exhibition rooms for fine arts, archaeological research, and history, including exhibitions of artifacts excavated from civilizations across the world and displays of the history of the old Hida Province of Japan.

The museum aims to protect and promote local culture as well as foster international exchange and understanding of ancient civilizations.

The museum was originally conceived as a memorial museum to commemorate Kotama Okada, founder of the Mahikari movement, and houses a memorial room. The museum was opened in 1999 based on the tenet proclaimed by the founder, "The origin of the earth is one, the origin of the universe is one, the origin of humankind is one, and the origin of all religions is one." Takayama City requested that the space also be used for the public, and the museum started holding art exhibitions. The museum has now been registered as a general incorporated foundation and has been classified as a registered museum under the Museum Act in Japan. The museum still has a room dedicated to commemorating the achievements of the founder but it is separated from the public area of the museum.

The Hikaru Museum exhibits Western art, including works by Van Gogh, Renoir, and Monet. The museum also showcases Eastern art, including the works of Katsushika Hokusai, Taikan Yokoyama, and Shoen Uemura. The museum has national treasures that are periodically on display, including a longsword (tachi) forged by Yasutsugu. The museum seeks to preserve the history of ancient civilizations, including permanent exhibits on relics from ancient civilizations around the world.

== See also ==
- Sukyo Mahikari
