= Mokichi =

- Gender: Male

Origin
- Origin: Japanese
- Meaning: Different meanings depending on the kanji used

Mokichi (written: 茂吉) is a masculine Japanese given name. Notable people with the name include:

- Mokichi Okada (岡田 茂吉; 1882–1955), Japanese religious leader
- Mokichi Saitō (斎藤 茂吉; 1882–1953), Japanese poet
