= WDL =

WDL may stand for:

- WDL Aviation, a German airline (subsidiary of WDL Group)
- Watch Dogs: Legion, a 2020 video game developed by Ubisoft Toronto
- Western Desert language, an Australian dialect cluster also known as Wati
- White Defence League, a former British far-right political group
- Woodlands MRT station, Singapore; station abbreviation WDL
- World Digital Library, an international digital library operated by UNESCO and the United States Library of Congress
- World Divine Light, a Japanese religious organization belonging to the Mahikari movement
- Workers' Defense League, a former American socialist organization devoted to promoting labor rights
