= Miho Museum =

Art museum in Japan

- ミホ ミュージアム
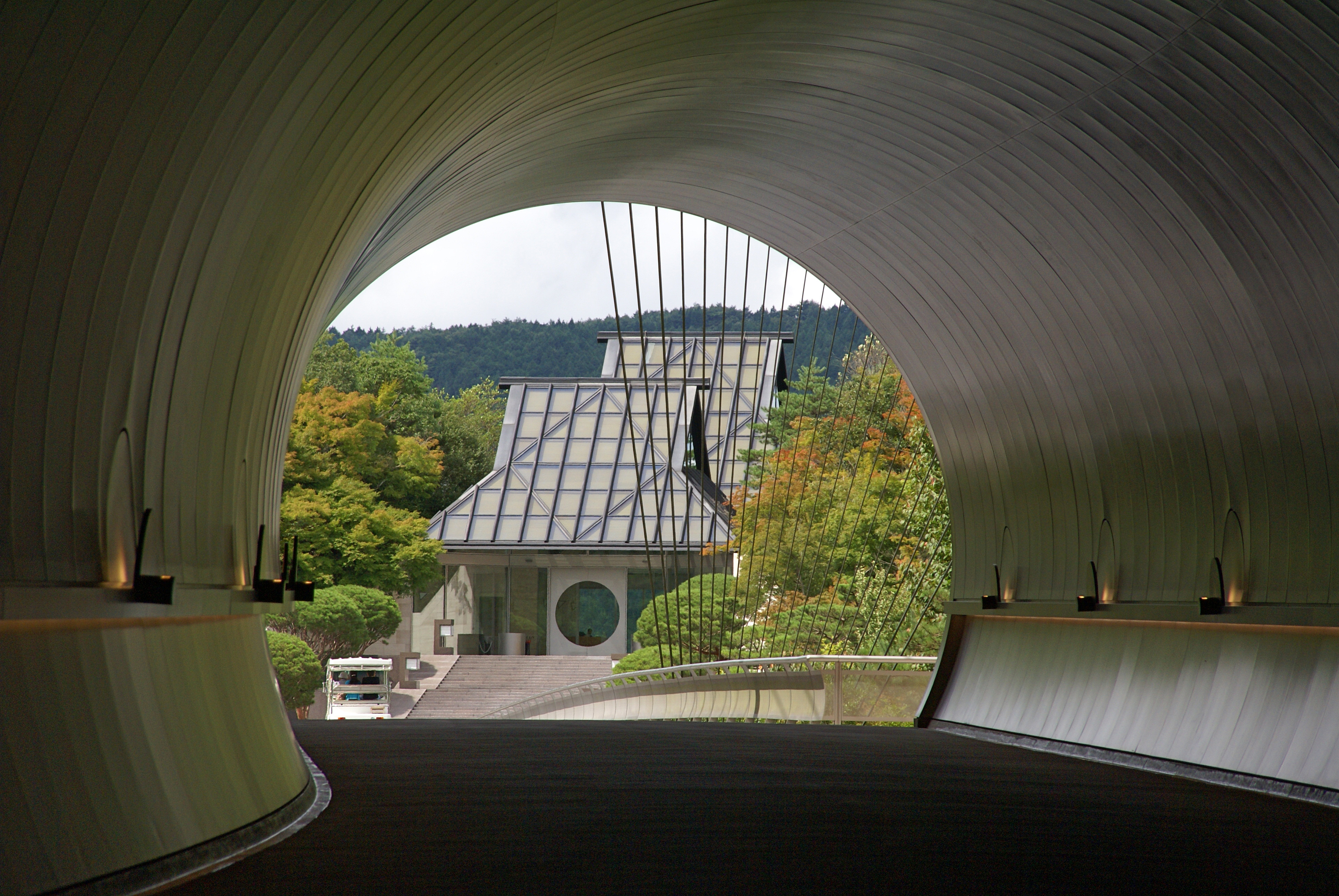
- Miho Museum In Autumn

- Miho Museum Miho Museum (Japan)
- Established: 1997
- Location: 300 Momoya Shigarakicho Tashiro, Koka-shi, Shiga-ken 529-1814
- Coordinates: 34°54′52.6″N 136°01′22.4″E
- Architect: I. M. Pei
- Website: www.miho.jp

The Miho Museum (Japanese: ミホ ミュージアム, romanized: Miho myūjiamu) is an art museum located southeast of Kyoto, Japan, in the Shigaraki neighborhood of the city of Kōka, in Shiga Prefecture.

== History ==
The museum was the dream of Mihoko Koyama (after whom it is named), founder of the religious organization Shinji Shumeikai which is now said to have some 300,000 members worldwide. Furthermore, in the 1990s Koyama commissioned the museum to be built close to the Shumei temple in the Shiga mountains. Meanwhile, the Church of World Messianity, the parent organization from which this Shumeikai came, had opened the "stunning" MOA Museum of Art in the mountains behind Atami in 1982.

Since its opening in 1997, the museum has been run by the Shumei Cultural Foundation. Takeshi Umehara, a scholar of philosophy and religion, served as the museum's first director.

== Collection ==
The Miho Museum collection began with Japanese art, including Shinto and Buddhist art, paintings, ceramics, lacquerware and tea ceremony utensils, collected by Mihoko Koyama for over 40 years. The collection consists of 3,000 pieces of Japanese and Oriental art, of which 250 to 300 are on display at any one time. Special exhibitions of Japanese art from the collection are held several times a year in the North Wing, and permanent exhibitions of other areas are held in the South Wing.

As of March 2022, the museum owns six of the more than 10,000 Important Cultural Properties of arts and crafts designated by the Japanese government. These included two Buddhist statues, a Buddhist painting, a Buddhist scripture, a quiver, and a tea bowl. In November 2022, the Japanese government announced the designation of three hanging scrolls in the museum's collection as Important Cultural Properties. This brings the total number of Important Cultural Properties in the museum's collection to nine. Two of the hanging scrolls were made by cutting out sections of the emakimono (picture scroll) Chōjū-jinbutsu-giga and reworking them into hanging scrolls. The other is a hanging scroll from the Masuda family's emakimono Jigoku zoshi (ja), which was cut out and reworked into hanging scrolls.

The museum's collection also includes Zo to kujira-zu byōbu (Elephant and Whale), a late masterpiece by Itō Jakuchū, one of Japan's most popular painters. This work made headlines in Japan in 2008 when it was discovered in an old house in the Hokuriku region.

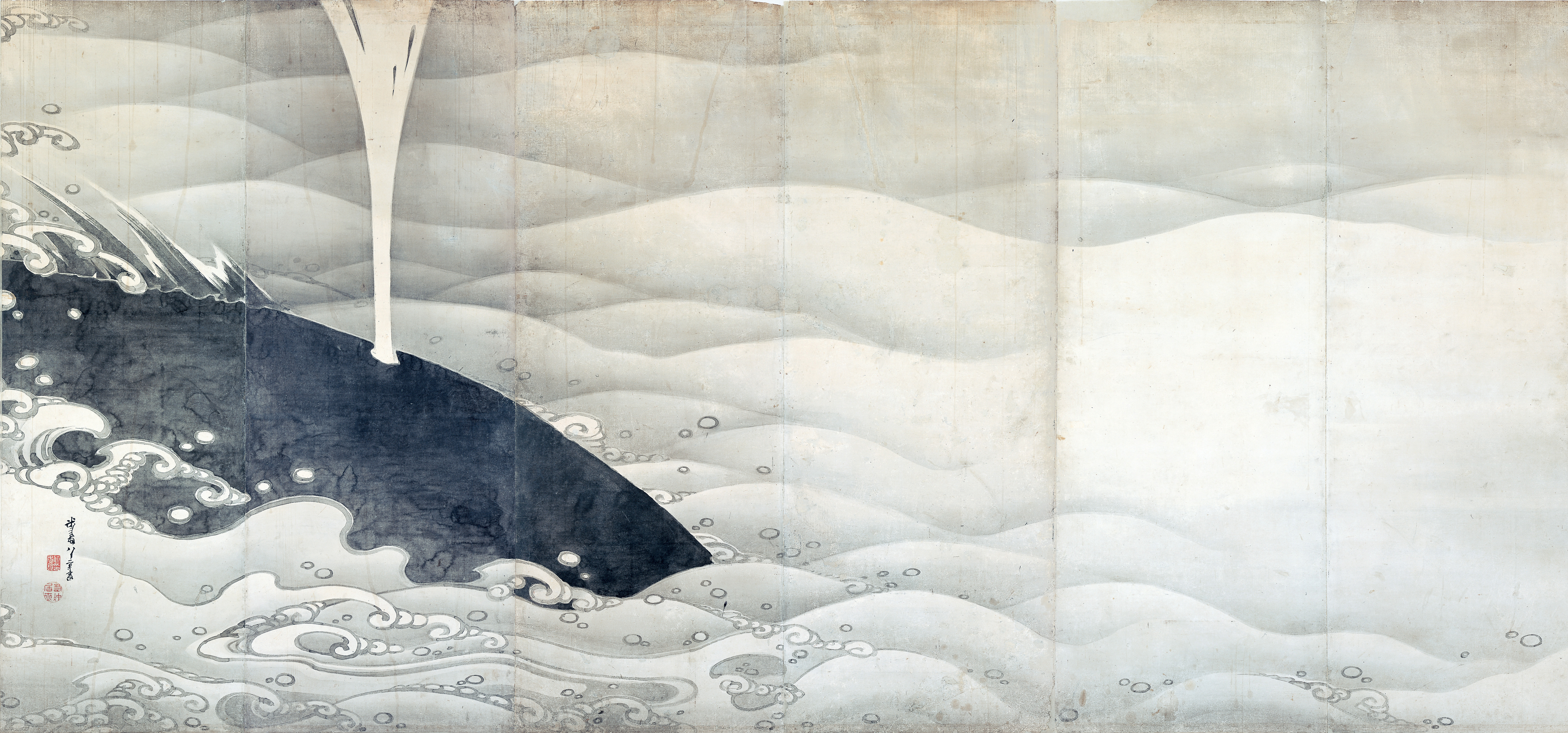
Zo to Kujira-zu byōbu (象と鯨図屏風, Elephant and Whale (left panel)), Itō Jakuchū, 1796

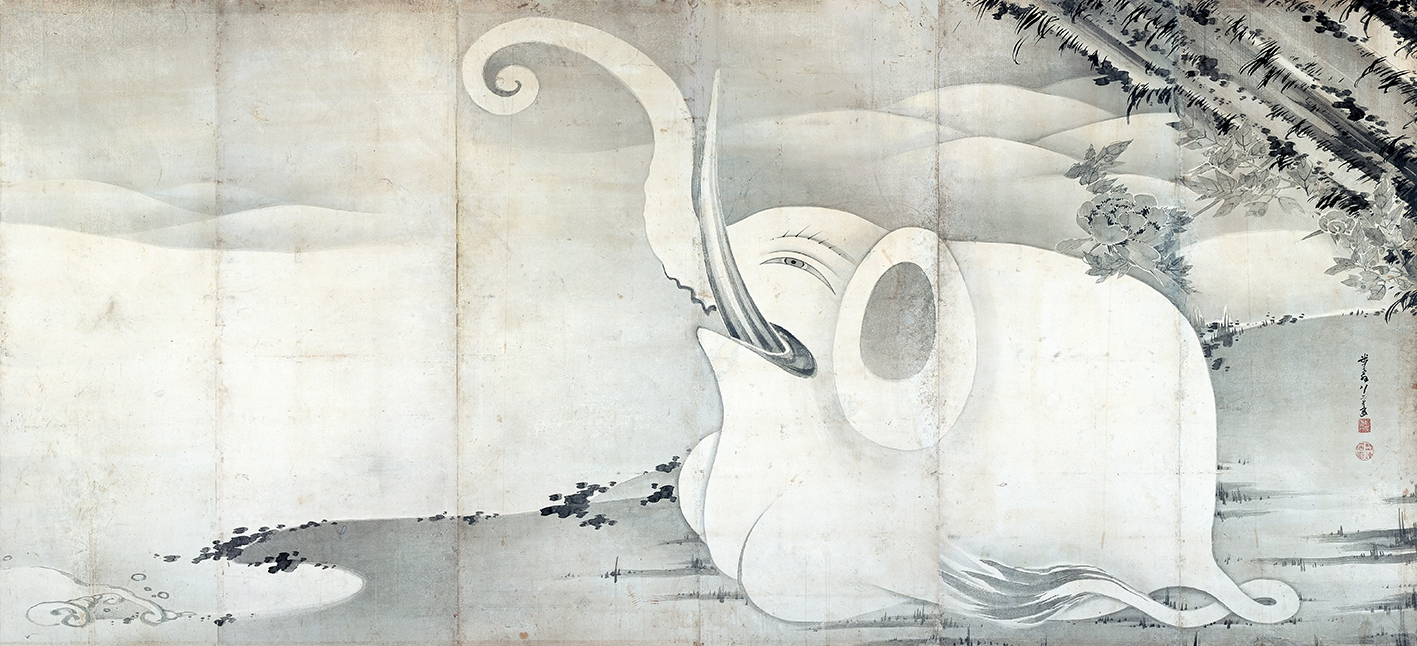
Zo to Kujira-zu byōbu (right panel), Itō Jakuchū, 1796

Among the objects in the collection are more than 1,200 objects that appear to have been produced in Achaemenid Central Asia. Some scholars have claimed these objects are part of the Oxus Treasure, lost shortly after its discovery in 1877 and rediscovered in Afghanistan in 1993. The presence of a unique findspot for both the Miho acquisitions and the British Museum's material, however, has been challenged.

Many of the items in the collection were acquired in collaboration with the art dealer Noriyoshi Horiuchi over the course of just six years, and some have little or no known provenance. In 2001 the museum acknowledged that a sixth-century statue of a Bodhisattva in its collection was the same sculpture which had been stolen from a public garden in Shandong province, China, in 1994, agreeing with the Chinese government to return it in 2007. At the time of the agreement, the Chinese government publicly stated that the museum had purchased the Buddha statue in good faith on the open market and had not committed any fraud.

Highlights of the collections have been featured in traveling exhibitions at the Los Angeles County Museum of Art and the Metropolitan Museum of Art in 1996, as well as the Kunsthistorisches Museum Wien (Vienna, Austria) in 1999.

== Architecture ==
Mihoko Koyama and her daughter, Hiroko Koyama, commissioned the American architect I. M. Pei to design the Miho Museum. Pei's design, which he came to call Shangri-La, is executed in a hilly and forested landscape. Approximately three-quarters of the 17,400 square meter building is situated underground, carved out of a rocky mountaintop. The roof is a large glass and steel construction, while the exterior and interior walls and floor are made of a warm beige-colored limestone from France – the same material used by Pei in the reception hall of the Louvre. The structural engineer for this project was Leslie E. Robertson Associates.

Pei continued to make changes to the design of the galleries during construction as new pieces were acquired for the collection.

Pei had earlier designed the bell tower at Misono, the international headquarters and spiritual center of the Shumei organization. The bell tower can be seen from the windows of the museum.

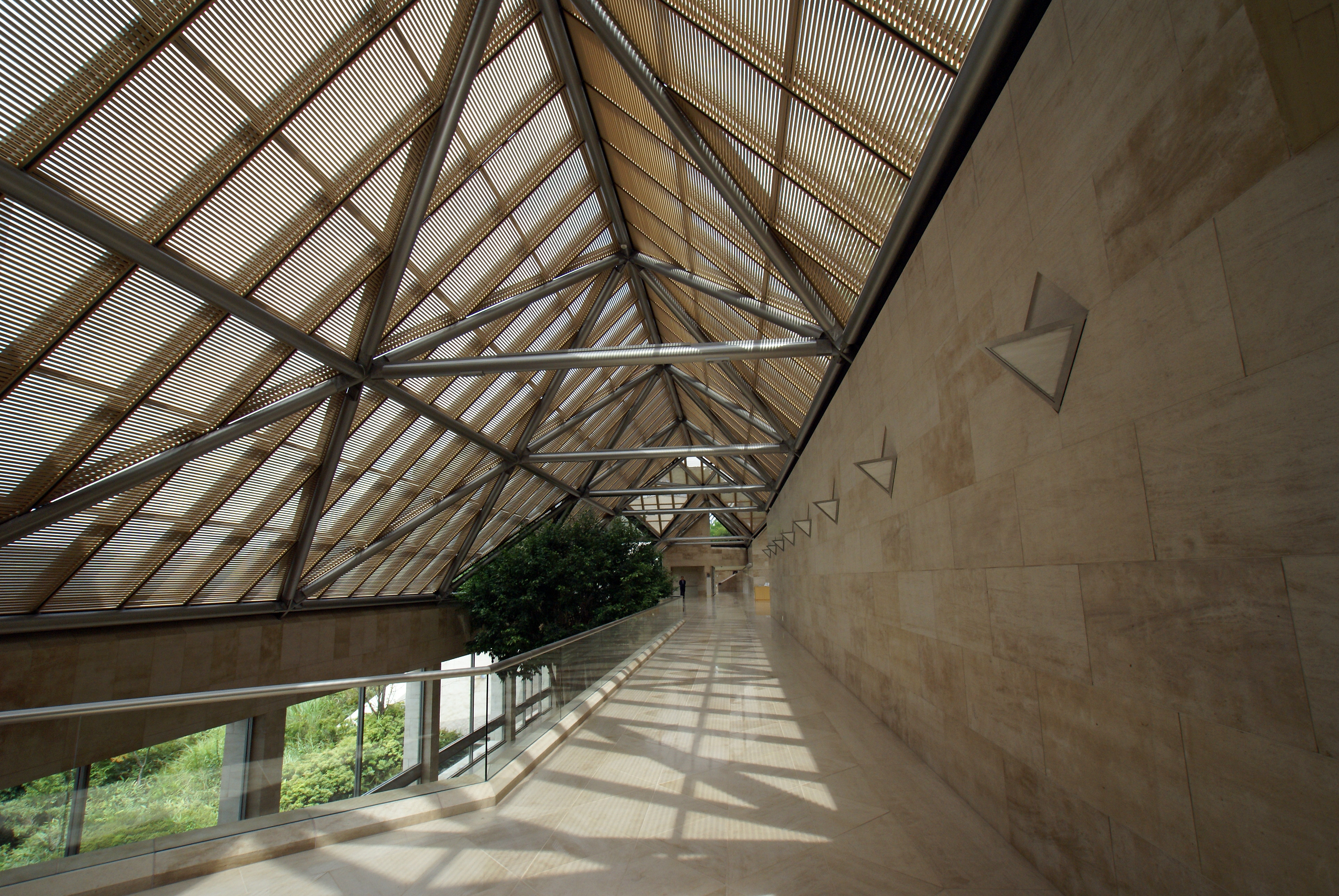
I. M. Pei's interior style in Miho museum

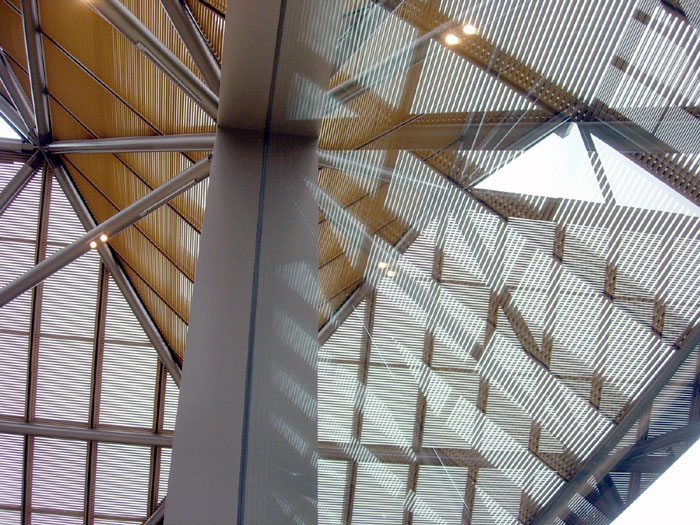
I. M. Pei's interior style in Miho museum

== Scandal ==
An anonymous Italian prosecutor said in 2007 that there were plans to seek the return of looted ancient Roman art and coins from the Miho Museum.

== See also ==
- MOA Museum of Art - An art museum that collects and exhibits the collection of Mokichi Okada.
- Antiquities trade
