= Johrei =

Type of energy healing

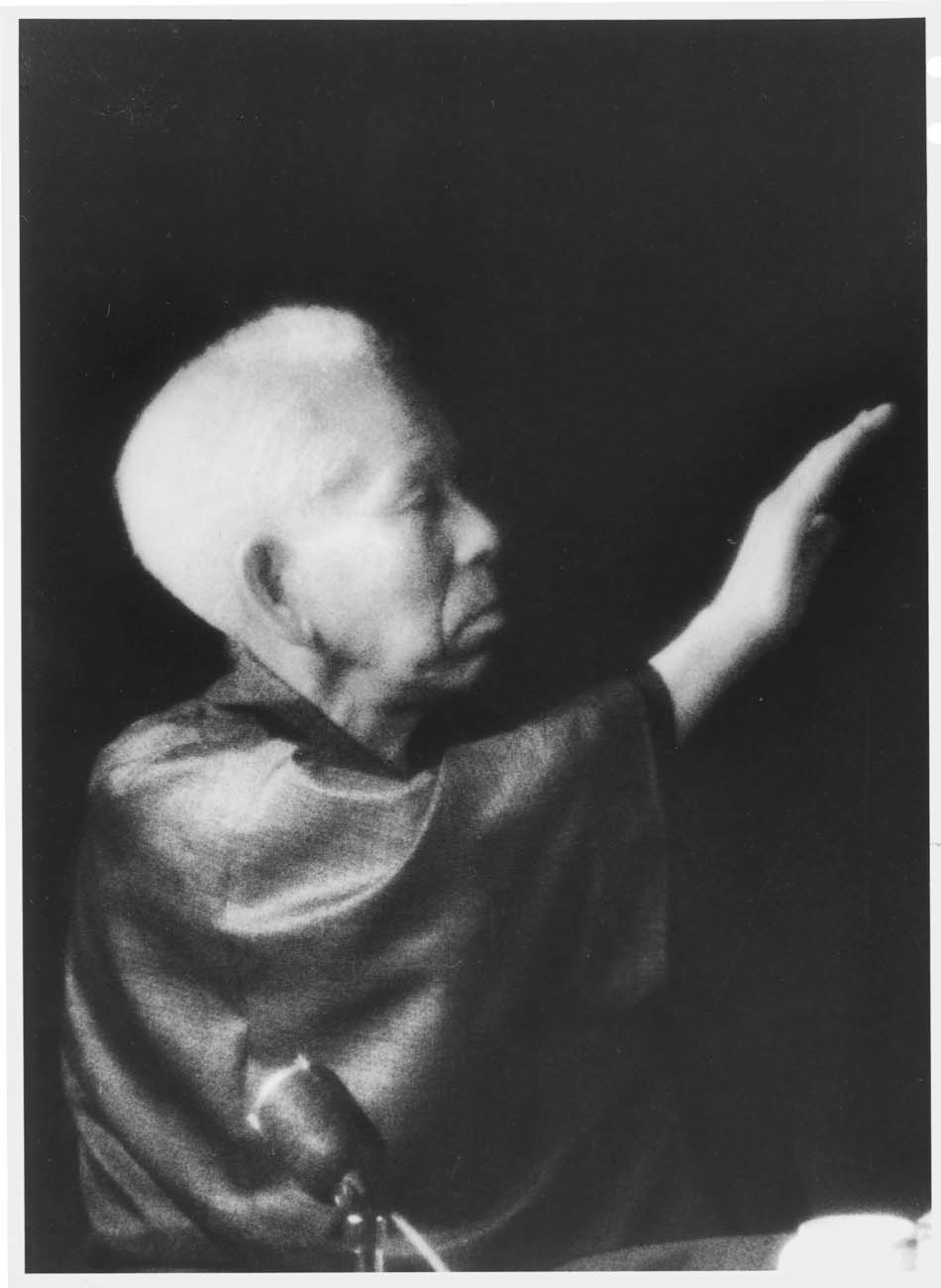
Mokichi Okada performing johrei

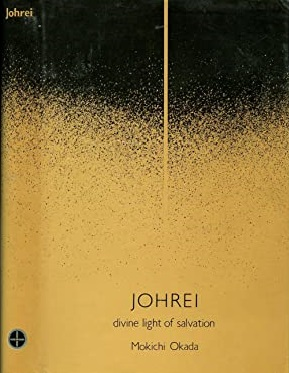
Johrei: Divine Light of Salvation by Mokichi Okada

Johrei (浄霊, Jōrei; lit. 'purification of the spirit'), spelled jyorei by Shumei groups, is a type of energy healing. It was introduced in Japan in the 1930s by Mokichi Okada, a.k.a. Meishu-sama.

Practitioners claim to channel light towards patients by holding up the palms of their hands towards the recipient's body. They often wear an O-Hikari (sacred focal point) which contains the Japanese symbol for light (Hikari (光)).

There are several organizations that follow Okada's teachings and use Johrei as a method for spiritual purification, including the Miroku Association, USA, Izunome (now World Church of Messiah), Mokichi Okada Association, the Johrei Foundation, the Johrei Institute, and Shinji Shumeikai (also called Shumei).

Sukyo Mahikari and other Mahikari religions have a very similar practice called okiyome (お浄め) ("purifying"), also known as tekazashi (手かざし) ("laying of hands"), which involves the transmission of divine light for spiritual healing.

Johrei forms one of the three pillars of Okada's philosophy of living, the Art of Healing, along with the Art of Beauty and the Art of Nature.

== Practice and delivery ==
Channeled through the palm of its administrator towards the patient's body, Johrei does not involve any therapeutic touch or laying on of hands. It is usually delivered while the recipient is seated, and the receiver may be asked to turn around during the session so Johrei can be channeled to their back. It can be delivered by a trained leader to a group. It can also be offered to animals and plants, or given via distance healing by focusing on the recipient's name, details and/or photo. Okada mentions that the sun is a good analogy for the work of his church, and members sometimes imagine the sun when sending Johrei.

Johrei is often practiced in homes and Johrei Centres, among families, Johrei members and to guests with no cost attached. In Johrei Centres, there is often a prayer offered at the start along with bowing, clapping in front of a sacred scroll with reverence shown to an image of Meishu-Sama. Prayers for the recipient are offered along with prayers for all their ancestors. A donation of gratitude may be given to the Centre.

=== Sonen ===
As part of the discipline, there is often a focus on the practice of sonen which is described as an alignment of Reason, Will and Feeling with a heartfelt prayer to God for the wellbeing and happiness of all.

=== Surrendering ===
Another feature of Johrei is the practice of surrendering - offering up all human experience to God with gratitude in the knowledge that everything teaches us something, even though it may not be clear at the time. As each and every thought and feeling well up in the mind and heart, both good and bad, they can be surrendered into the hand of God, so the Johrei member is not overwhelmed by the purification and can carry on with an open heart and clear mind.

=== O-Hikari ===
Practitioners wear a blessed pendant called an O-Hikari which is hung at the solar plexus level. It has the Japanese symbol for 'light' written on or in it, copied from Okada's sacred art calligraphy and is blessed by the current Kyoshu Spiritual Leader. It is a symbol of membership of a Johrei organisation and the member's dedication to Meishu-Sama and his teachings. It is said to represent the member's connection to Heaven and when not worn, it should be kept in a high place or stored in a special box. If dropped, the O-Hikari should be blessed newly by the local Johrei Minister and the member should pray to understand how this situation could reflect their thoughts and beliefs about their relationship with Heaven, and they should seek to resolve whatever arises.

== Philosophy ==
Johrei is based on the principle that illness originates in the spirit, so one must purify the spirit to heal the body. Expressed as "Soul is Principal and Body is its Subordinate" or that the "spiritual precedes the physical", it is explained in further detail in one of many of Mokichi Okada's teachings. Okada explained that we have a spiritual counterpart of the body and when the spiritual body is pure, the physical body receives the life/light energy it needs to stay healthy, but when the spiritual body is clouded, the light is blocked and clouds occur and toxins build up in the body. Johrei, the divine Light of Salvation, brings people back into the presence of God's light and reconnects their spirit with heaven. The light from God then bathes the recipient in Divine love, burning through the layers of clouds and melting the toxins in the body, which would be eliminated via usual elimination methods such as the breath and urine.

Okada explained that this type of healing works was because synthetic substances or metabolic wastes in the body become toxins, which cause many forms of illnesses, and transform into defilement in the spirit. Furthermore, trauma or harmful behavior and ideas produce defilement in the spirit and become toxins in the body. Removal of toxins in the body, that is, elimination of defilement in the spirit, results in the fundamental solution of any type of illness and leads to true happiness.

This is similar to the Chinese teachings about Qi and the meridian system but unlike in Traditional Chinese medicine, he did not recommend the traditional treatments. Okada warned that the use of drugs and medicinal herbs could cause further toxins to build up and create further pain or illness, although he did himself use medicine growing up. Okada said that colds and flu are the natural way of the body eliminating clouds and toxins via a fever, coughing and sneezing and the body should be allowed to purify in as natural a way as possible. However, in the case of frailty and weakness, recovery might be difficult. But suffering and chronic ill health, he explained, are not part of God's plan for paradise on Earth, which is why he gave humanity Johrei. Okada asserted that "A permanent solution for disease is not possible by treating only the body (matter) and neglecting the spirit. Johrei sheds divine light directly on the soul".

=== Purpose ===
Despite presenting itself as a form of alternative medicine, the Johrei Fellowship maintains that it does not prescribe, diagnose, or treat physical illnesses and that their focus is on spiritual health and world peace instead of physical health. The mission of Johrei is to bring about ideal conditions on Earth, replacing illness, poverty and strife with health, prosperity and peace, but Johrei is not about restoring physical health. The ultimate objective must also include the necessary spiritual elevation and understanding which make possible each individual's constructive participation in creating Paradise on Earth.

== Origin and history ==
Okada was born into a Buddhist family, and also practiced the traditional Japanese animist religion, Shinto.

After many setbacks in life and in a search for meaning, Okada became a member of Oomoto, one of Japan's new religions that was preparing for the New Age of Light, where he practiced a traditional hands-on, massage style Shinto-based purifying therapy. Okada was familiar with miteshiro o-toritsugi (み手代お取次) (itself based on chinkon kishin (鎮魂帰神) (lit. 'calming the soul and returning to the divine')), an Oomoto spiritual healing practice from the 1920s that involved the use of rice ladles, which he later adapted to become johrei. There are links between Okada and Mikao Usui, who started the reiki healing technique, as they both were part of Omoto at the same time.

=== Okada Purifying Therapy ===
Okada started to develop a hands-on massage based therapy. During this time, he gained a dedicated following and published a number of magazines and books, personalising his healing technique into Okada Purifying Therapy.

=== Johrei is born ===
In 1925, Okada explained he had a vision of the Buddhist Bodhisattva Kannon (Kuan Yin) and she gave him the divine light, along with a command that Okada proclaim himself a prophet. He later established the Great Japan Association for the Veneration of the Bodhisattva Kanon, with divine healing as its main purpose. He started teaching the channeling of light and was keen to leave behind the physical therapy asserting that he had only invested in it because the government was suspicious of New Religions and it was the only way he could practice the spiritual purification at that time. He told his followers that the world was moving into the age of light and great purifications would occur. As a result, people would get very sick but God had blessed him with the new healing method to save as many souls from suffering as possible. In 1935 the organisation developed into the World Church of Messianity Sekai Kyūsei Kyō, also translated as the Church of World Salvation. Okada's grandson Kyoshu-Sama now heads the organisation and has re-christened the movement back to its originally intended name, the World Church of Messiah.

Johrei was introduced to America in 1953, and there are numerous Johrei centers throughout the United States, Thailand, Brazil, Europe, Africa, and many other countries worldwide.

== Efficacy ==
Like other paranormal or spiritual healing programs, Johrei is not considered scientifically plausible. There is no good scientific evidence of medical benefit.

A study published 2006 showed that exam-stressed participants who received Johrei had slightly favorable changes to two out of the five mood and stress indicators measured by the study, compared to participants who waited without any intervention.

== Controversies ==
=== Cult concerns ===
Edzard Ernst, in his book Alternative Medicine – A Critical Assessment of 150 Modalities, says that Johrei groups have many of the characteristics of a cult. Okada had many devoted followers, and he prescribed strict ways of doing things. Proponents say this was not uncommon in Japan at the time. He did however encourage his followers to embrace modern life, to see films and he is reported to have a deep love and care for all individuals, and strong desire to help all people who were in suffering.

Johrei notably gained a negative image due to complaints levelled against the Mahikari sect, a parallel organisation run by Okada Yoshikazu (not related to Okada Mokichi). Mahikari – meaning 'true light' also practiced an almost identical form of Johrei and prayers but the movement attracted a lot of criticism for generating an environment of fear, power abuse and control, lying to followers, forgery of ancient artifacts, and promoting harmful activities and beliefs.

=== No longer by hand ===
In 2020 the World Church of Messiah, announced that Johrei via raising the hand is not the final will of Meishu Sama. The Church explained that Okada had told his followers repeatedly in the 1950s, “From now on, we enter the world of sonen. Johrei is not so important anymore. Sonen comes first, so pray in your hearts.” He taught that the divine work of salvation went from the phase of the visible form of Johrei of raising one's hand, to the world of the invisible form, the “world of sonen.” Okada said he received a message from God that the Age of Light had dawned for humanity and he should not raise his hand for Johrei any longer as God was sending Johrei all the time to everyone. Okada gave himself Johrei all the same, and found that he developed a headache. Thereafter he warned his followers, but after his death, this message was lost and people continued to practice Johrei in the way he had earlier shown them. The World Church of Messiah now maintains it is intended that Johrei be received directly from God, as "God is always facing us and is ministering Johrei to us". The Church clarified "Meishu-sama is teaching us that even for people whose illness is not healed, even for people for whom no miracles occur, even for people with incurable diseases, there is salvation. There is the light of eternal life. God radiates that light within us. Meishu-sama is teaching us to come, come to that light of God, and you, then, will be saved."

Various groups worldwide which are unaffiliated to the Church still continue to practice Johrei in the original way such as in Shumei and the Johrei Fellowship.

== See also ==
- Barbara Brennan
- Chinkon kishin
- Church of World Messianity
- Energy medicine
- Jin Shin Do
- Kampo
- Kappo
- Macrobiotic diet
- Mokichi Okada
- Nature Farming
- Reiki
- Shiatsu
