= Shinji Shumeikai =

Japanese new religious movement

- 神慈秀明会
- Headquarters: Miho Museum in Kōka, Shiga, Japan
- Founder: Mihoko Koyama (小山美秀子)
- Origin: 1970
- Branched from: Church of World Messianity
- Other name(s): Shumei

Shinji Shūmeikai (神慈秀明会) (often abbreviated to Shumei) is an international spiritual fellowship and organization founded in 1970 by Mihoko Koyama (小山美秀子). Prior to founding the organization, she was president of the Shumei Church, the largest internal association of the Sekai Kyūseikyō (世界救世教, Church of World Messianity), and founded the organization as a spin-off of the Church of World Messianity. The purpose of the organization was to promote the health, happiness and harmony of all people by applying the insights of Mokichi Okada, the founder of the Church of World Messianity. According to the organization, the founder is not Mihoko Koyama, but Mokichi Okada.

Reverently known as Meishusama within Shumei, Mokichi Okada taught that a world free of sickness, poverty, and strife could be achieved through spiritual healing, a reverence for nature, and the appreciation of art and beauty. The movement claims that no conflicts exist between itself and other spiritual paths that seek universal well-being. Its members come from diverse backgrounds, and many maintain and deepen their own beliefs while participating in Shumei. Further, Shumei holds that it maintains dialogue with people of all spiritual paths to promote tolerance and peace.

The head organization is currently based near Shigaraki, Shiga, Japan.

== Founder ==
"It was through illness that I was privileged to become God’s Student."—Meishusama

Born in Tokyo, Japan in 1882, Meishusama (Mokichi Okada) spent most of his youth suffering from poverty and various diseases. At the age of 37, Meishusama began searching for the spiritual meaning of life and joined the Shinto-related religious group Oomoto. Followers claim that miraculous events followed one after another after joining. In 1934, he started his own organization called the Kannon Society of Japan. He believed that Kannon, the deity of compassion, was empowering and guiding him.

== Philosophy and practices ==
Meishusama (Mokichi Okada) taught that a world free of sickness, poverty, and discord is within everyone’s reach through the spiritual healing of Jyorei, the practice of Natural Agriculture, and the appreciation of Art and Beauty.

Shumei believes in the pursuit of beauty through art, appreciation of nature and "natural agriculture", a method of food cultivation. They also practice johrei, a type of spiritual healing. Adherents of Shumei believe that, in building architectural masterpieces in remote locations, they are restoring the Earth's balance.

== Influence and architecture ==
The Miho Museum was commissioned by Mihoko Koyama, who was an adherent of Okada. The architect I. M. Pei had earlier designed the bell tower at Misono, the international headquarters and spiritual center of the Shumei organisation. Mihoko Koyama and her daughter, Hiroko Koyama, again commissioned Pei to design the Miho Museum. The bell tower can be seen from the windows of the museum.

Founders Hall was designed by Japanese-American architect Minoru Yamasaki.
