= Mount Kurai =

Mountain in Gifu Prefecture, Japan

- 位山
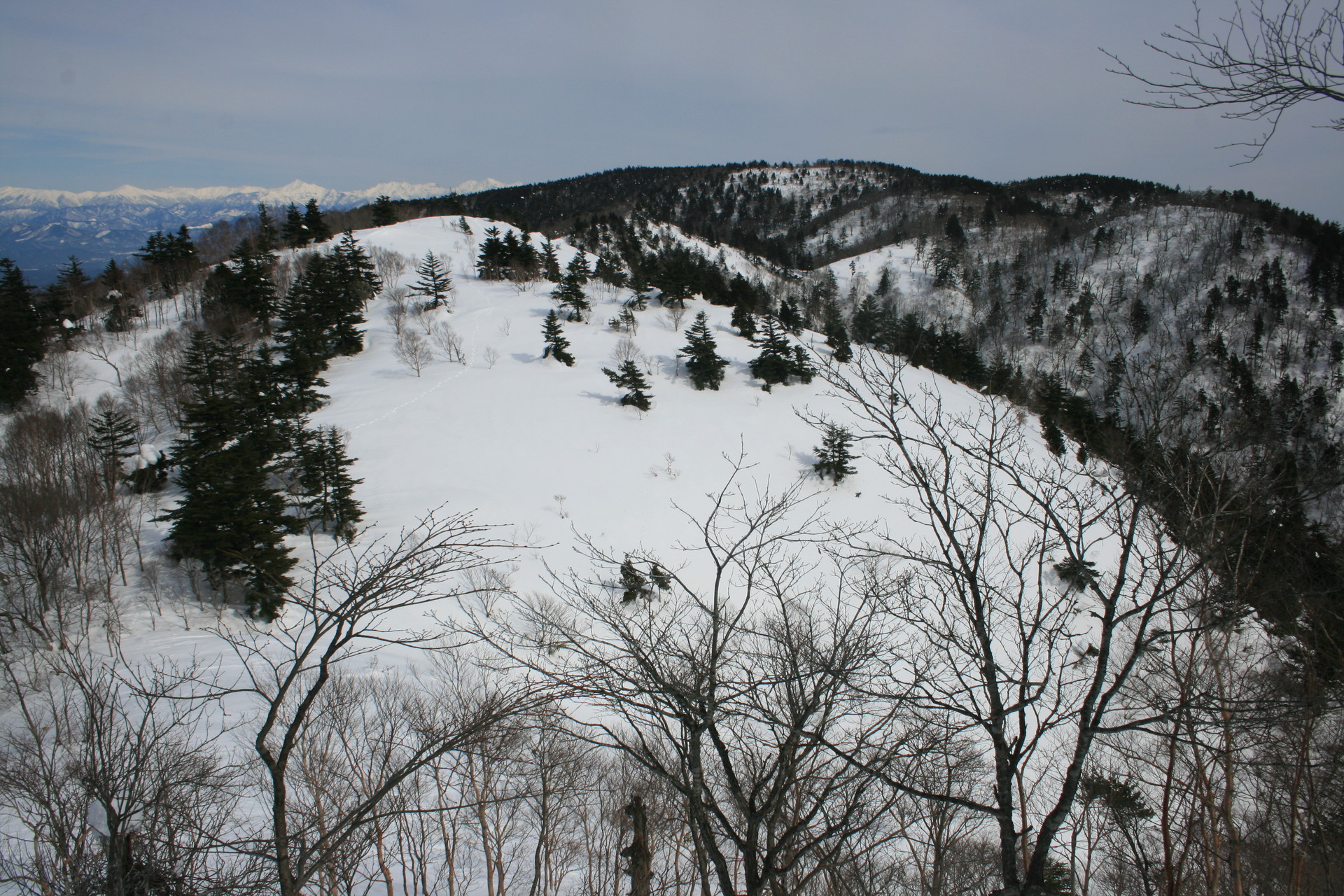
- Mount Kurai from the south

Highest point
- Elevation: 1,529.15 m (5,016.9 ft)
- Coordinates: 36°02′18″N 137°11′48″E

Geography
- Location within Japan
- Location: Takayama and Gero, Gifu Prefecture, Japan
- Parent range: none

Mt. Kurai (位山, Kurai(-san); lit. 'throne mountain') is located on the border of the cities of Takayama and Gero in Gifu Prefecture, Japan. The mountain also separates the watersheds of the northern and southern portions of the Hida region. The Jinzū River flows to the north and the Hida River flows to the south.

== History ==
Mt. Kurai harbors a substantial population of Japanese yew trees. In the past, this forest was long a traditional source for the wood used to manufacture ceremonial batons for the Japanese court aristocracy.

On October 18, 1984, the Inner Shrine (Okumiya) of the World Shrine (世界総本山奥宮) was inaugurated by the Japanese new religious organization Sukyo Mahikari on the summit of Mount Kurai.

== Religious sites ==
The Japanese new religion Sukyo Mahikari has built a temple on Mount Kurai that is very close to the summit. Additionally, Hikaru Seidō 光聖堂 (consisting of Hikaru Shinden 光神殿 and Seishu-den 聖珠殿), a memorial complex commemorating the religion's main founders, is located in the southeastern foothills of Mount Kurai. Hikaru Shinden memorializes Kōtama Okada, and Seishuden memorializes Keishu Okada. Both memorials in Hikaru Seidō are built like Mayan pyramids. The Sukyo Mahikari Youth Center (眞光青年会館) is located in the eastern foothills of Mount Kurai.
