= Nature Farming =

Organic agricultural system founded in Japan

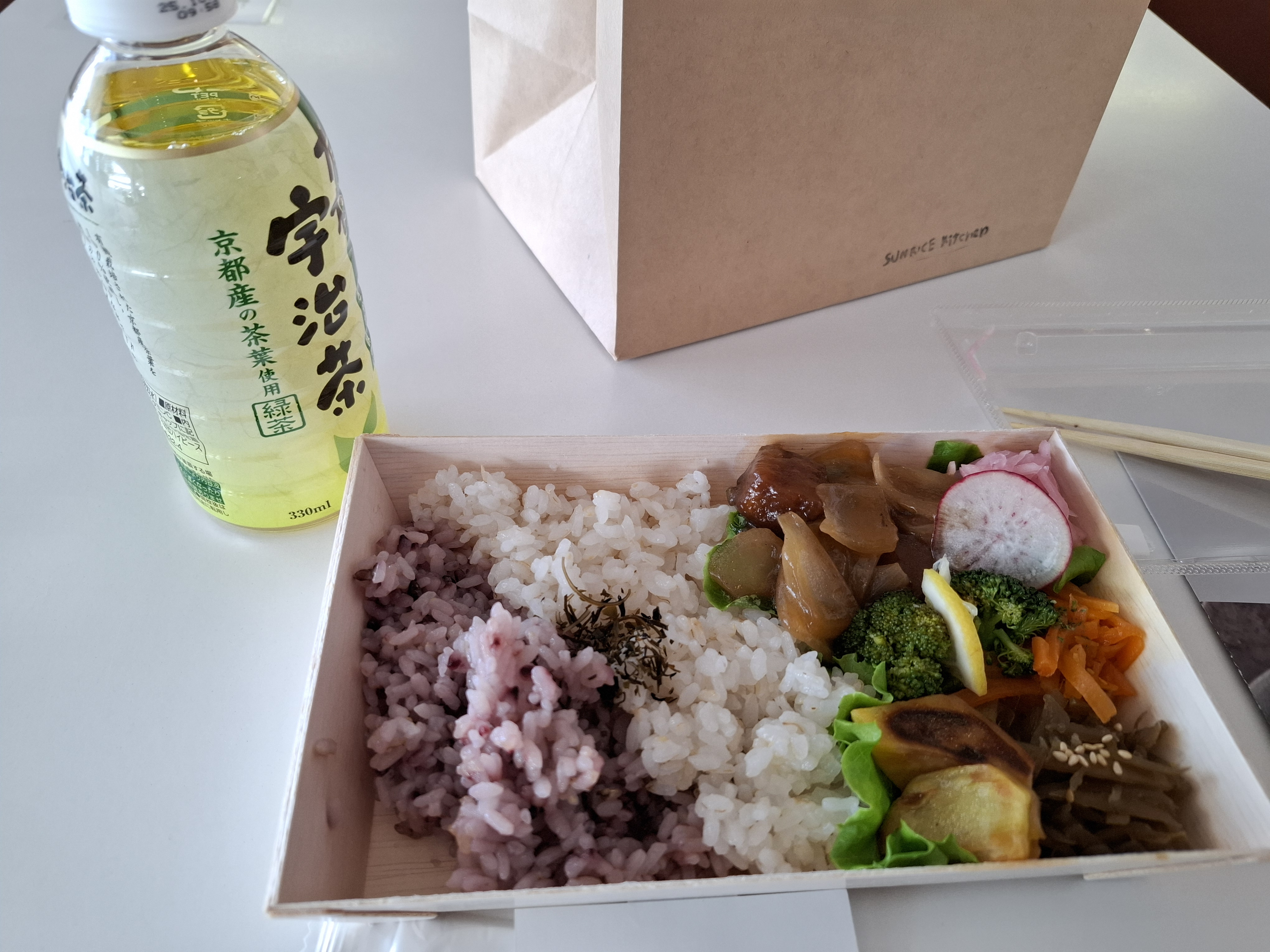
An organic bento made from ingredients grown using Nature Farming, sold at Kyusei Kaikan (the Church of World Messianity's headquarters in Atami)

Nature Farming (自然農法, shizen nōhō) is an organic agricultural system established in 1936 by Mokichi Okada, the founder of the Church of World Messianity. It was also originally known as "no fertilizer farming".

Offshoots such as the Sekai Kyusei Kyo, promoting ‘Kyusei nature farming’, and the Mokichi Okada Association formed after his death to continue promoting Nature Farming in Japan and Southeast Asia.

ZZ2, a farming conglomerate in South Africa has translated the term to Afrikaans, "Natuurboerdery".

According to the International Nature Farming Research Center in Nagano, Japan, it is based on the theories that:

- Fertilizers pollute the soil and weaken its power of production.
- Pests would break out from the excessive use of fertilizers
- The difference in disease incidence between resistant and susceptible plants is attributed to nutritional conditions inside the body.
- Vegetables and fruits produced by nature farming taste better than those by chemical farming.

The term is sometimes used for an alternative farming philosophy of Masanobu Fukuoka.

== Natural Farming ==
Another Japanese farmer and philosopher, Masanobu Fukuoka, conceived of an alternative farming system in the 1930s separately from Okada and used the same Japanese characters to describe it. This is generally translated in English as "Natural Farming" although agriculture researcher Hu-lian Xu claims that "nature farming" is the correct literal translation of the Japanese term.

== See also ==
- No-dig gardening
- No-till farming

== Bibliography ==
- Okada, Mokichi. 1951. 自然農法解說 / Shizen nōhō kaisetsu. Tōkyō: 榮光社出版部 / Eikōsha Shuppanbu.
