= Kirisuto no Haka =

Tomb in Aomori Prefecture, Japan

Coordinates: 40°27′14″N 141°08′55″E

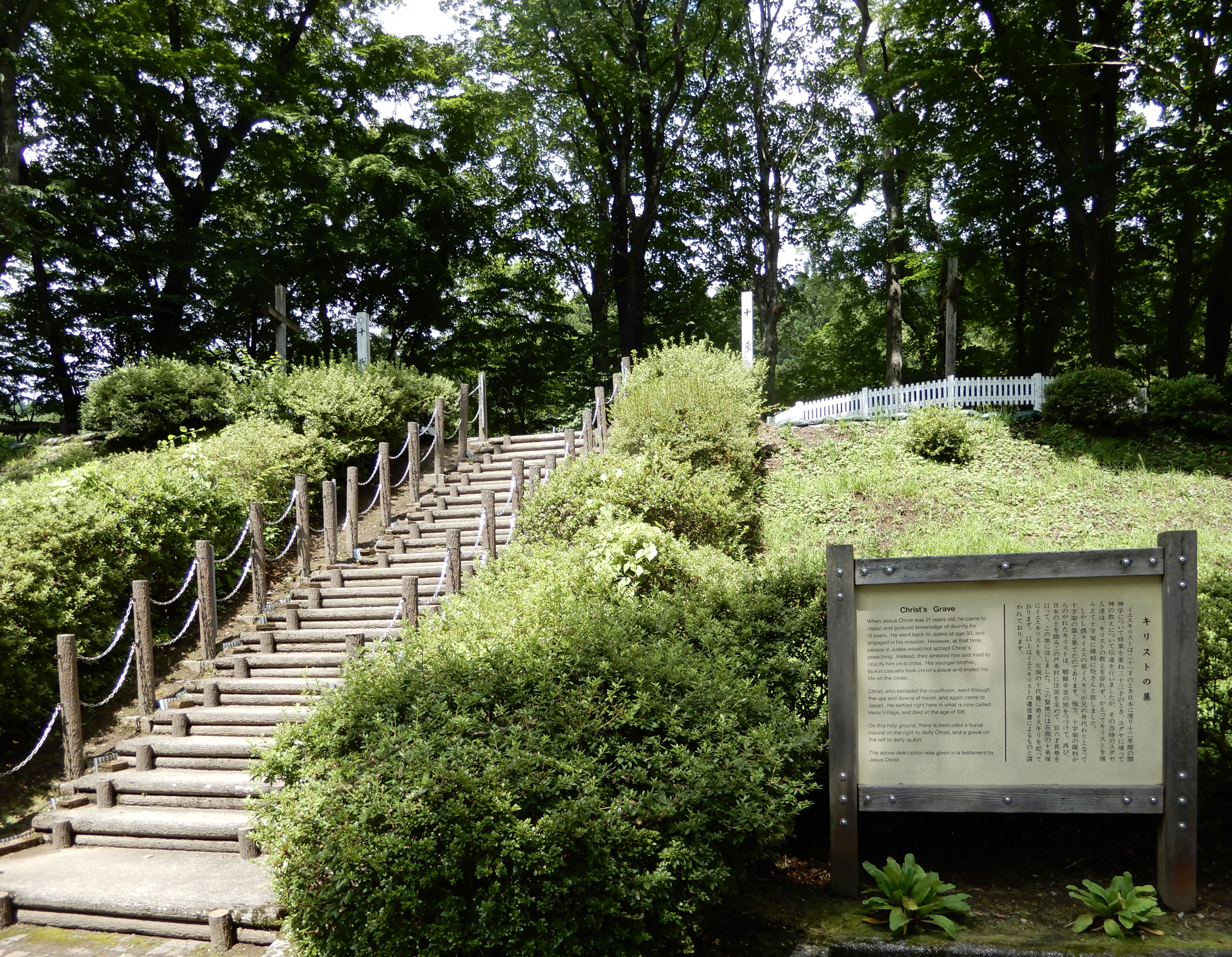
The tomb in 2018

Kirisuto no Haka (Japanese: キリストの墓) (lit. 'Tomb of Christ') is a tomb claimed to be that of Jesus in Shingō, Aomori Prefecture, Japan.

Kiyomaro Takeuchi claimed that he discovered the tomb in 1935 while he was surveying the village of Herai (current village of Shingō). (Note: Some sources list the year of discovery as 1936. In this article we use the year 1935, which is in the Brigham Young University (BYU) journal article and most sources. BYU is closely associated with The Church of Jesus Christ of Latter-day Saints.) The Takeuchi documents, which are believed to be a hoax, claim that Jesus underwent training in Japan for 12 years before spreading Christianity. The manuscript also claims that instead of Jesus, his brother Isukiri died on the cross and Jesus escaped to Herai through Siberia, residing there until his death at the age of 106. Although these claims were not taken seriously by the residents of the village or the public, the site is currently used as a tourist spot by the village, with festivals being held every June since 1964. Historian and literature professor Kokichi Kano was asked to examine the documents in May 1928 but declined. In 1935 he was asked again and did examine five of the seven Takeuchi documents and proved them modern forgeries. Others claim the documents are fake. There are some people who believe the documents are real. The Koso Kotai Jingu Shrine in Ibaraki Prefecture claims to keep the documents and sacred treasures, which they claim can not be told to those outside the family, and that the documents are only notes of oral transmissions.

== Description ==
It is claimed that the tomb was discovered in 1935 by Kiyomaro Takeuchi. According to claims made by the Sawaguchi family, Jesus came to Japan when he was 21 years old and went into religious training for 12 years before going back and spreading Christianity. In the claims, Jesus Christ did not die on the cross at Golgotha. Instead, a man alleged to be his brother, Isukiri, took his place on the cross, while Jesus escaped across Siberia and crossed the sea into the current-day Hachinohe to Mutsu Province, in northern Japan. Once in Japan, Jesus changed his name to Torai Tora Daitenku. In Japan, Jesus allegedly married a 20-year-old woman named Miyuko, with whom he fathered three children, all daughters. The eldest daughter married into the Sawaguchi family, which is claimed to hold a direct lineage to Jesus, evidenced by certain non-Japanese physical characteristics. After his death at an age of 106, Jesus was said to have been interred into one of two grave mounds in the village. A lock of hair that belonged to him is allegedly buried in the other mound.

An on-site sign states:

Christ's Grave

When Jesus Christ was 21 years old, he came to Japan and pursued knowledge of divinity for 12 years. He went back to Judea at age 33 and engaged in his mission. However, at that time, people in Judea would not accept Christ's preaching. Instead, they arrested him and tried to crucify him on a cross. His younger brother Isukiri casually took Christ's place and ended his life on the cross.

Christ, who escaped the crucifixion, went through the ups and downs of travel, and again came to Japan. He settled right here in what is now called Herai Village and died at the age of 106.

On this holy ground, there is dedicated a burial mound on the right to deify Christ, and a grave on the left to deify Isukiri.

The above description was given in a testament by Jesus Christ.

== History ==
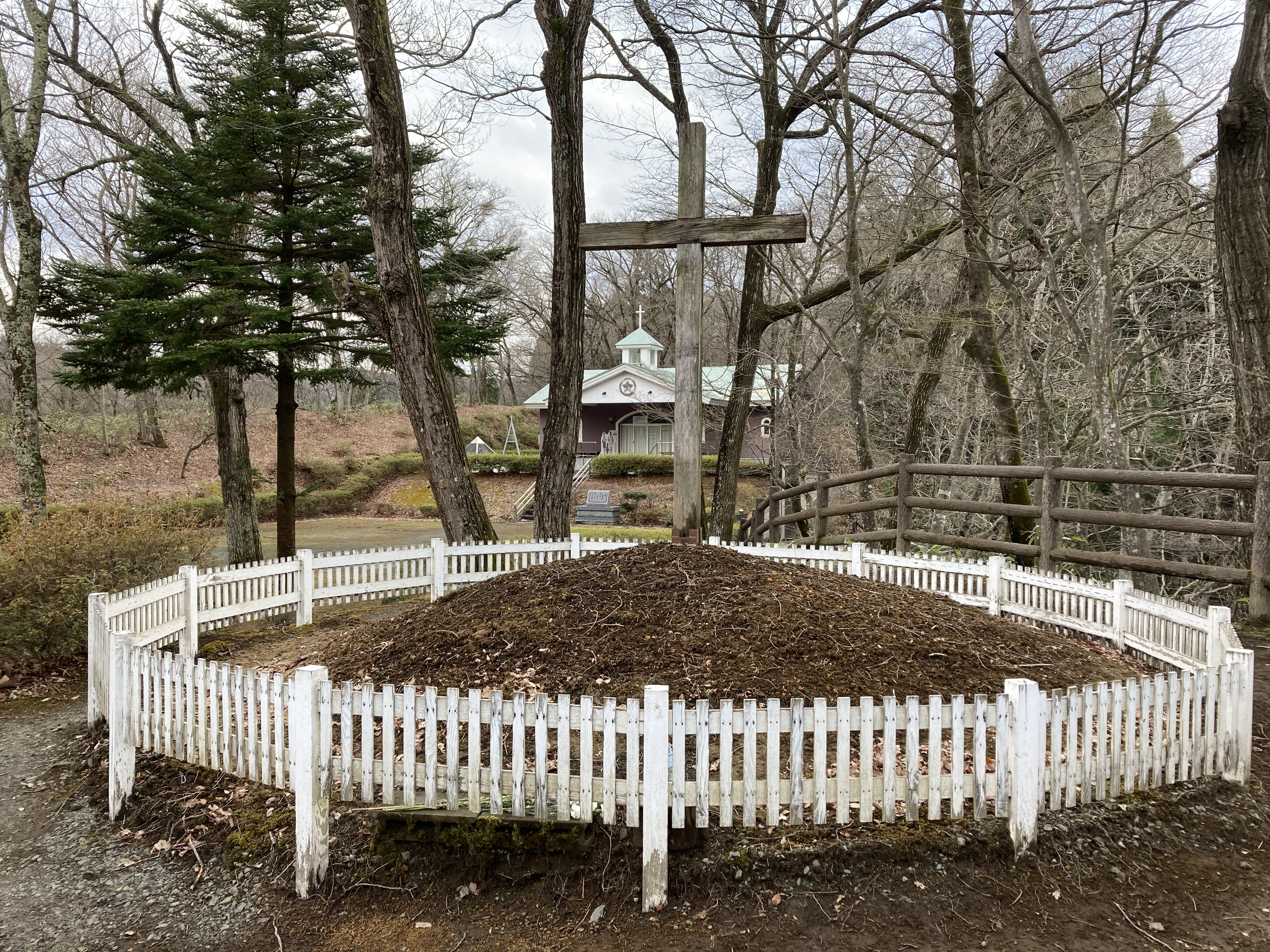
Jesus' alleged gravesite

In 1934, the head of the village of Herai (current village of Shingō) was trying to utilize a movement attempting to turn the area around Lake Towada into a national park to advertise the village. The head of the village invited Toya Banzan, a Japanese painter to survey the region, hoping a connection between the lake and the section of the village called Mayogatai would be found. Toya claimed to own a manuscript passed down through his family, which is claimed to have the history of Japan before the reign of Emperor Jimmu. Although the manuscript was later deemed a hoax, it also claims Moses, Confucius, and Mencius were trained in Japan. In a survey conducted in the summer of 1935, Takeuchi claimed that he discovered the Christ's grave in Herai. The discovery not only surprised the local villagers as they had no traditions directly related to Jesus, but was not taken positively due to the anti-Western sentiment at the time. The manuscript was later burned and lost in Tokyo during World War II, which made the verification of the manuscript's claims impossible.

The site was then forgotten for decades until an occult boom in the 1970s, when it received media attention due to its strangeness. Although most villagers never believed in the hoax, and there were no Christians in the village, the village ended up hosting a matsuri for Jesus every year in June from 1964. A traditional song sang in the festival has been passed down through generations with no meaning of the lyrics told, although there is a saying that the song may be written in Hebrew to praise God. According to the local residents, this action was to preserve the existing culture and to advertise the village as a tourist spot.

== Use as a tourist attraction ==
The village uses the hoax to attract tourists, describing itself as the resting place of Jesus. The so-called tomb and its surrounding buildings are utilized as the village's tourist attractions.

=== Christ Village Tradition Museum ===
The museum has exhibitions about the town's story about Jesus, along with several other stories such as how Emperor Chōkei might have fled to the village and died there. The museum also features the "Jerusalem stone", gifted to the village of Shingō by Israel.

The museum claims that many of the unique customs of the village, like the now-lost custom of drawing a cross on the forehead of infants, come directly from the teachings and direction of Jesus. Tens of thousands of pilgrims, pagans, and tourists travel to the site annually, making it the small village's primary source of tourism. Past estimates of the number of annual visitors have ranged between 20,000 and 40,000 a year.

=== "Kiristop" ===
The store's name and logo resembles a known brand Ministop, and the store is operated by a local businessman since 2011 or 2012. The store opens every Sunday. According to the store's owner, the store was opened to create a place where tourists can spend money, as no such place existed back then.

== See also ==
- Japanese-Jewish common ancestry theory
- Legendary Forest Park Moses Park
