= Church of World Messianity =

Japanese new religion

- 世界救世教
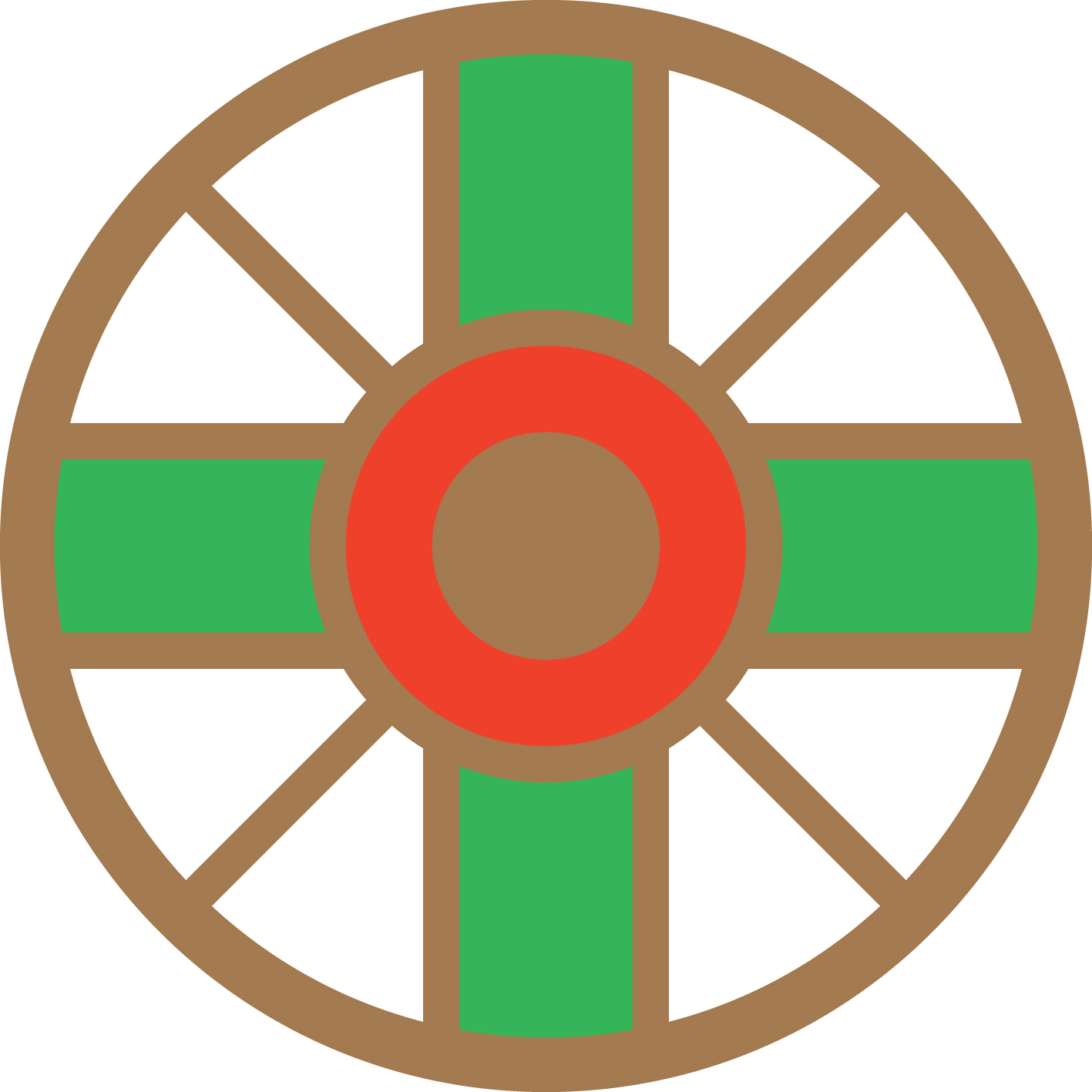
- Type: Japanese new religion
- Headquarters: Atami, Shizuoka Prefecture, Japan
- Founder: Mokichi Okada
- Origin: 1935
- Separations: Shinji Shumeikai

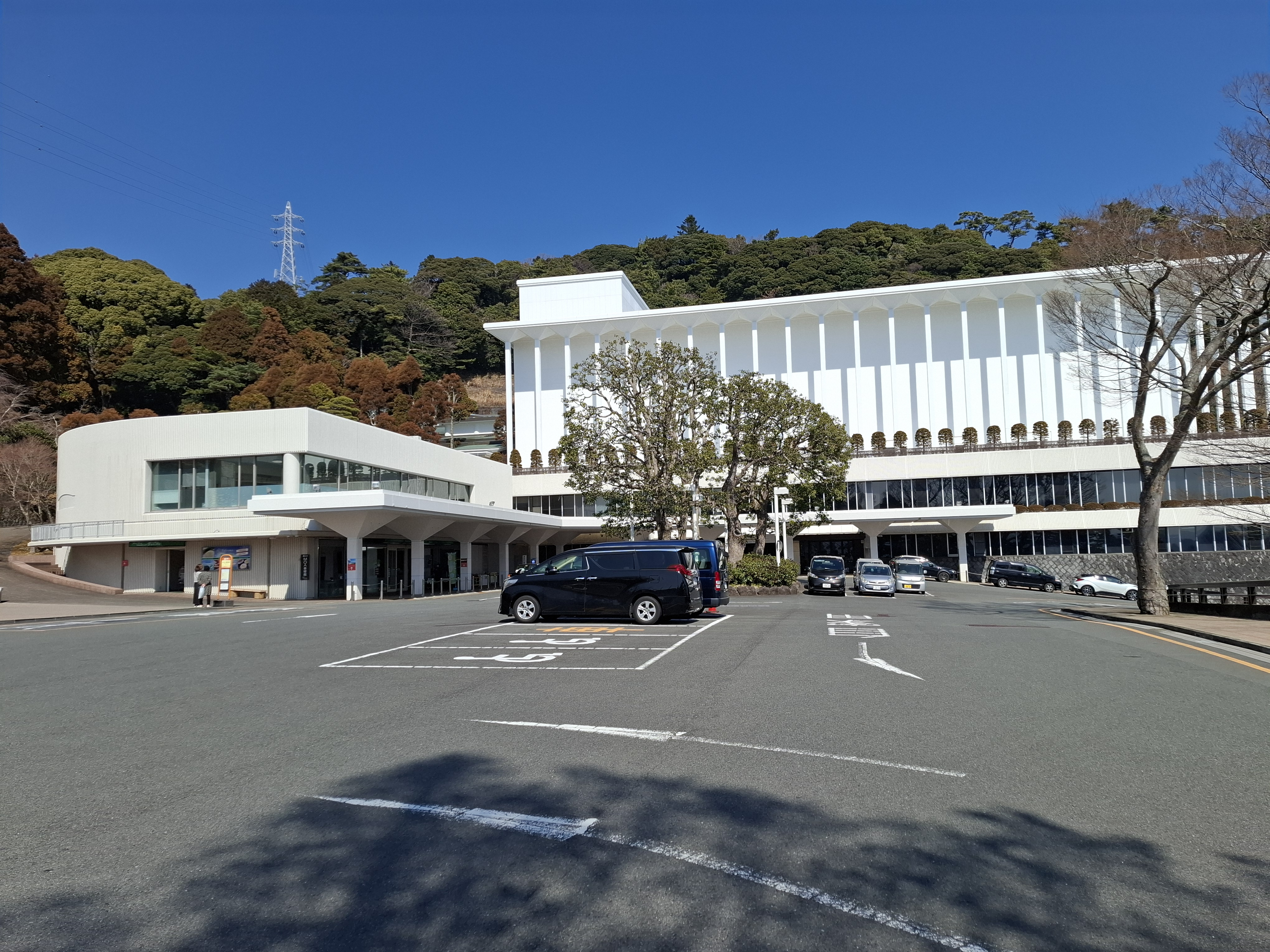
The Kyūsei Kaikan (救世会館) at Zuiunkyō (瑞雲郷), Atami, Shizuoka, where services are regularly held

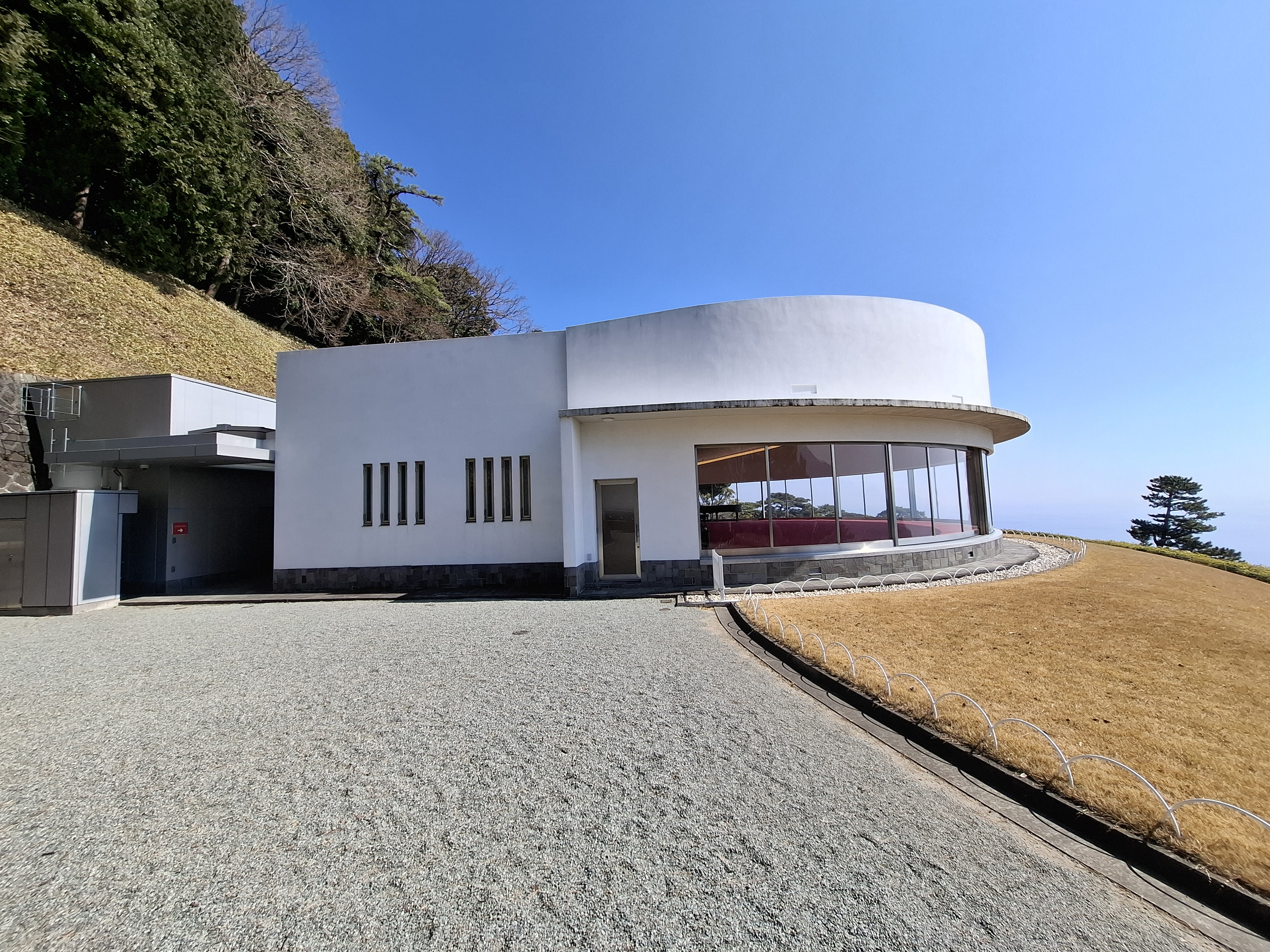
The Crystal Hall at Zuiunkyō in Atami

The Church of World Messianity (Japanese: 世界救世教; rōmaji: Sekai Kyūsei Kyō), abbreviated COWM, is a Japanese new religion founded in 1935 by Mokichi Okada.

Its headquarters in Atami, Shizuoka is called the Zuiunkyō (瑞雲郷) (lit. 'Land of Auspicious Clouds').

== History ==
In 1926, Okada claimed to have received a divine revelation that empowered him to be a channel of God's Healing Light (johrei) to purify the spiritual realm to remove the spiritual causes of illness, poverty, and strife from the world and inaugurate a new Messianic Age. He went on to teach Johrei to his followers to allow them to achieve Messianity and spread the teachings across the world. Members are given permission to channel Johrei by wearing an O-Hikari pendant containing a copy of one of Mokichi Okada's calligraphies. He is often referred to as "Meishu-Sama" (Lord of Light) by his followers.

Okada's teaching is represented by a number of his works, such as Foundation of Paradise and Johrei: Divine Light of Salvation, which has been edited and translated by the Society of Johrei, an offshoot of COWM.

Yoshikazu Okada, the founder of the Mahikari religion, was originally a follower of Sekai Kyūsei Kyō (Church of World Messianity).

== Beliefs and practices ==
There are three pillars of the religion, of which the key concept is Johrei, claimed to be a method of channeling divine light into the body of another for the purposes of healing. Other formal practices include the Art of Nature which includes nature farming, and the Art of Beauty which includes practices such as Ikebana (Japanese flower arranging).

The name for God in Sekai Kyūseikyō is Miroku Ōmikami (大光明真神).

According to anthropologist of religion Winston Davis, Mahikari groups are comparable to the Church of World Messianity and follow basically the same healing ritual.

== Demographics ==
The movement currently claims 800,000 followers, including many in Brazil. Shinji Shumeikai (神慈秀明会), also known as Shumei, also follows the teachings of Okada and is considered a descendant of the church by CFAR.

=== In Brazil ===
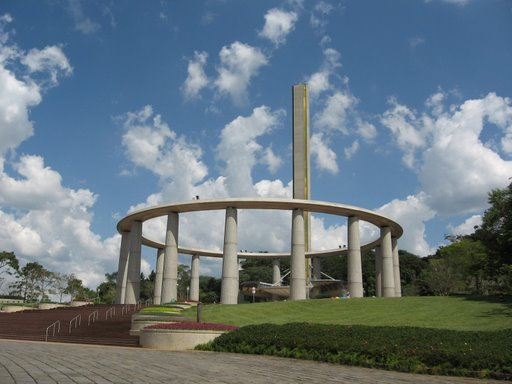
Church of World Messianity in Guarapiranga

Japanese Brazilians are the largest concentration of people of Japanese descent outside Japan. According to Hideaki Matsuoka of the University of California, Berkeley, in a presentation at the Summer 2000 Asian Studies Conference Japan entitled "Messianity Makes the Person Useful: Describing Differences in a Japanese Religion in Brazil," Japanese new religions have propagated in Brazil since the 1930s and now have at least a million non-Japanese Brazilian followers. Four major religions ranked by the number of followers are Seicho-no-Ie, Messianity, Sukyo Mahikari, and PL Kyodan.

In Brazil, Guarapiranga is the sacred place of the Church of World Messianity (Portuguese: Igreja Messiânica Mundial).

== Museums ==
The Church of World Messianity operates two art museums.

- Hakone Museum of Art (箱根美術館, Hakone Bijutsuskan) in Shinsenkyō (神仙郷), founded in 1952
- MOA Museum of Art (MOA美術館, MOA Bijutsuskan) in Zuiunkyō (瑞雲郷), founded in 1982

Shinji Shumeikai (also known simply as Shumei), a splinter organization of the Church of World Messianity, operates the Miho Museum in Kōka, Shiga. The museum also serves as the organization's headquarters.

== Organizations ==
The Church of World Messianity consists of a coalition of three organizations:

- Sekai Kyūseikyō Izunome Kyōdan 世界救世教いづのめ教団 (or "Izunome")
- Sekai Kyūseikyō Tōhō no Hikari Kyōdan 世界救世教東方之光教団 (or "Tōhō no Hikari")
- Sekai Kyūseikyō Su no Hikari Kyōdan 世界救世教主之光教団 (or "Su no Hikari")

There are also various schisms and splinter organizations, such as Sukui no Hikari Kyōdan (救いの光教団), established in 1972.
