= Light of God =

Light of God may refer to:

- Divine light, a religious concept
- Divine spark, a religious concept
- Inward light, a Quaker religious concept
- Nūr (Islam), an Islamic religious concept

== See also ==
- Divine light (disambiguation)
- Dominus illuminatio mea, a Latin motto meaning "the Lord is my light"
- Mahalalel, the name of a biblical figure meaning "the shining one of El"
- Neri (given name), a Hebrew given name meaning "my candle/lamp"
- Neriah, the name of a biblical figure meaning "my lamp is Jah"
- Nuriel, the name of an angel meaning "El is my fire/light"
- Nurullah, an Arabic given name meaning "light of Allah"
- Uriah (disambiguation), a Hebrew given name meaning "my flame/light is Jah"
- Uriel, the name of an archangel meaning "El is my flame/light"
