= Sukyo Mahikari =

Japanese religious organization

- 崇教眞光
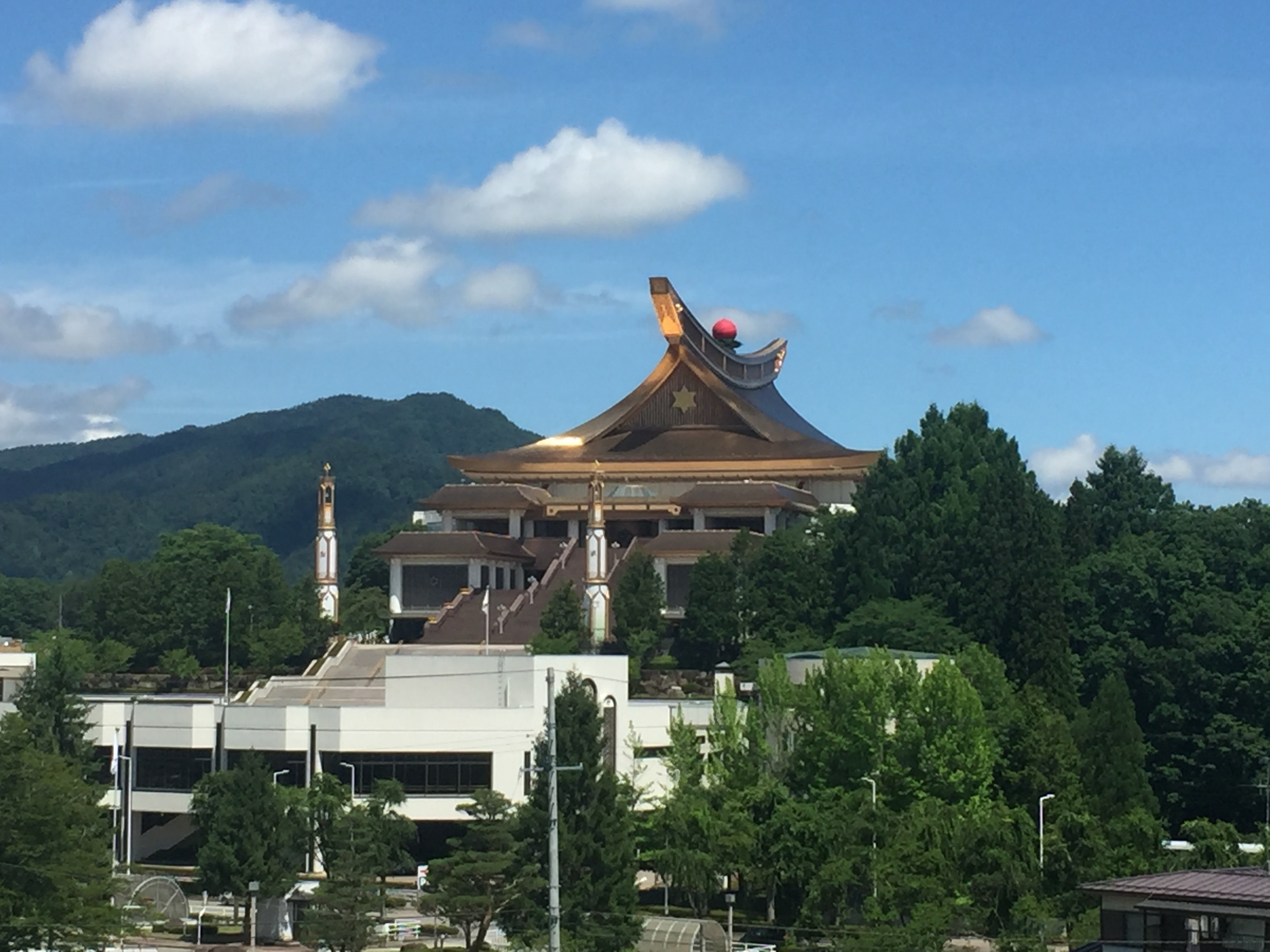
- World Shrine of Sukyo Mahikari in Takayama
- Type: Japanese new religion
- Spiritual leader: Kōō Okada (岡田光央)
- Headquarters: Takayama, Gifu, Japan
- Founder: Keishu Okada (岡田恵珠)
- Origin: June 23, 1978
- Branched from: Mahikari
- Official website: www.sukyomahikari.or.jp

Sukyo Mahikari (崇教眞光, Sūkyō Mahikari; lit. 'Universal Principles True Light') is a Japanese form of philosophy. It is one of the Mahikari movement religions and has centers in more than 100 countries. The stated aim of the organization is to help people improve the quality of their lives and attain happiness by practicing universal principles, as well as a method of spiritual purification called the "art of True Light".

The headquarters of Sukyo Mahikari is located in Takayama, Gifu. The main shrine is known as the World Shrine or Motosu Hikari Ōkamu no Miya. In 2013, Sukyo Mahikari announced it had a membership of approximately one million practitioners.

== History ==
The original Mahikari organization was founded by Kōtama Okada in 1959 under the name L. H. Yokoshi no Tomo Association. In 1963, L. H. Yokoshi no Tomo Association was registered as a religious organisation under the new name of Sekai Mahikari Bunmei Kyodan (世界真光文明教団).

After Kōtama Okada's death in 1974, several followers claimed to be the next spiritual leader, or oshienushi (教え主). Sakae Sekiguchi was selected by the leadership of Sekai Mahikari Bunmei Kyodan, but Keishu Okada, the adopted daughter of Kōtama Okada, contested the appointment in an ultimately unsuccessful court case that lasted eight years. On June 23, 1978, Keishu Okada announced the establishment of Sukyo Mahikari, while Sekai Mahikari Bunmei Kyodan is now known outside Japan as World Divine Light.

On October 18, 1984, the Inner Shrine (Okumiya) of the World Shrine (世界総本山奥宮) was inaugurated near the summit of Mount Kurai. The World Shrine (Suza) was inaugurated in Takayama City on November 3, 1984.

In 1998, questions were raised in the European Parliament regarding potential embezzlement of funds from the European Community Humanitarian Aid Office (ECHO) to benefit Sukyo Mahikari. ECHO confirmed that EU funds had been granted to restore the gardens of Sukyo Mahikari's EU headquarters, the New Castle of Ansembourg, but denied all other allegations.

The shrine, Hikaru Shinden (光神殿), is dedicated to the founder, Sukuinushisama. It was inaugurated on June 23, 1992.

On May 5, 2002, the Sukyo Mahikari Youth Center (眞光青年会館) was inaugurated in Kuguno, Japan.

On November 3, 2009, the organization officially announced that the third spiritual head of the organization would be Kōō Okada (岡田光央; born Teshima Tairiku 手島泰六 in 1947).

== Beliefs and practices ==
The organization aims to promote peace and harmony in society through the practice of a method of spiritual purification and the practice of universal principles, such as gratitude, acceptance, and humility in all aspects of life.

The core practice of Sukyo Mahikari is the art of True Light, which involves the transmission of Light energy to purify the spirit, mind, and body.

=== The art of True Light ===
Sukyo Mahikari introduces a practice to purify one's spiritual aspect as an expedient toward attaining happiness. Radiating Light from the palm of the hand is a method of spiritual purification that cleanses the spirit, mind and body. It is said to help open the way to resolving all manner of problems. By purifying the spiritual aspect with the Light and leading a life based on principles of sustainability, people can revive their spirituality and attain increasing health, harmony and prosperity.

The transmission of Light is referred to as "the art of True Light." Through the palm of the hand, a person (the giver) radiates Light to another person (the receiver), allowing them to purify and revitalize their spirit, mind and body.

Radiating Light can be practiced by anyone who so desires, by attending the Sukyo Mahikari primary course.

A session of Light typically begins with both the giver and receiver offering a short prayer. Next, the giver of Light recites a prayer that is believed to have a strong power of purification (the "Amatsu Norigoto Prayer"). The giver then holds his or her hand approximately 30 centimeters (12 inches) from the receiver's body. Sessions of Light usually last anywhere from 10 to 50 minutes.

Sukyo Mahikari does not advocate the use of the art of True Light as a substitute for medical treatment or therapy. The founder of Mahikari, Kōtama Okada, taught that the purpose of the art of True Light is not to heal disease or illness, but to be of service to society, bring happiness to people, and attain divine nature.

The art of True Light is said to purify the spiritual realm of one's home and society, making them more peaceful and harmonious. Thus, members are encouraged to radiate the Light to anything, anywhere, and at any time. Thus, the Light is not only radiated to human beings, but also to animals, food, buildings, and the natural environment.

=== Universal principles ===
Sukyo Mahikari teaches the concept of universal principles that, when practiced together with the Light, allow one to more quickly attain spiritual and personal growth.

Sukyo Mahikari encourages people to incorporate the divine principles in their daily life by practicing virtues such as altruistic love, gratitude, humility and acceptance of the will of God. Members also practice prayer, cultivating positive and cheerful attitudes, promoting love and harmony, and helping others.

Founder Kōtama Okada believed that if people lived in accordance with the universal principles, they would cultivate their spirituality, and naturally come to use science and technology that was integrated with an understanding of spirituality, to find solutions to pressing issues facing humanity.

=== Other beliefs ===
Sukyo Mahikari promotes the practice of yoko agriculture. The practice of yoko agriculture involves organic agriculture combined with the use of positive words and attitudes to help people to cultivate respect for nature and restore soil to its pure and fertile condition. Accordingly, respect for nature and the natural environment is encouraged. The arbitrary use of chemical fertilizers, without consideration for the local environment, is discouraged. The organization has helped to create natural farms and promotes the distribution of natural and organic produce throughout the world.

== Organization and membership ==
=== Headquarters, regional headquarters, and local centers ===
The headquarters of Sukyo Mahikari is located in Takayama City, Gifu Prefecture, Japan. Sukyo Mahikari has established regional headquarters in Australia-Oceania, Asia, Europe, Africa, Latin America, and North America, with centers located in over 100 countries. Within the United States and Canada, Sukyo Mahikari has 21 spiritual development centers.

In Takayama and surroundings, the religion's holy sites are:

- Headquarters: The World Shrine 世界総本山 (Motosu Hikari Ōkamu no Miya 元主晃大神宮)
- Aiwakan 愛和館, the second shrine 第二神殿 (also called "The Second Noah's Ark" 第二のノアの方舟)
- Hikaru Seidō 光聖堂 (consisting of Hikaru Shinden 光神殿 and Seishu-den 聖珠殿) in the southeastern foothills of Mount Kurai 位山. Hikaru Shinden memorializes Kōtama Okada, and Seishuden memorializes Keishu Okada. Both memorials are built like Mayan pyramids.
- The Inner Shrine (Okumiya) of the World Shrine (世界総本山奥宮) on the summit of Mount Kurai was inaugurated on October 18, 1984.

Other major buildings in the Takayama area are:

- Hikaru Museum
- Sukyo Mahikari Youth Center 眞光青年会館, located at the eastern base of Mount Kurai
- Hikaru Art Gallery 光アートギャラリー / Headquarters Annex 本部分室

=== Membership ===
Sukyo Mahikari had approximately a million practitioners who form its membership as of 2011.

Becoming a member of Sukyo Mahikari does not require giving up any pre-existing beliefs or accepting Sukyo Mahikari as the only path or faith. Sukyo Mahikari teaches that the art of True Light and the universal principles transcend religious denominations and differences in ethnicity, nationality, and ideology. Sukyo Mahikari promotes cooperation and understanding between religious organizations toward establishing a sustainable and peaceful society. The emphasis the organization places on the spiritual unity of human beings has resulted in a membership that reflects a diversity of religions and nationalities.

Sukyo Mahikari does not practice any form of tithe. The organization is sustained by the voluntary contributions (offerings) made by members. Rather than the amount, emphasis is placed on making offerings with sincerity. People are encouraged to make offerings that are voluntary and not beyond one's means. There are no mandatory contributions. However, there is a set amount for the appreciation offering to attend the introductory course and the spiritual cord maintenance offering. Members are encouraged to offer the monthly spiritual cord maintenance offering, which is approximately $7 in the U.S. and a similar amount in other regions. Cornille writes that there are a number of types of offerings in the organization: the spiritual cord maintenance offering; True Light appreciation offering; the special protection appreciation offering, and so on.

== Yoko Civilization Research Institute ==
In 1985, Keishu Okada established the Yoko Civilization Research Institute (YCRI). The objective of the forum is to find solutions to today's problems by having leaders in different fields, regardless of their race, nationality, religion, and ideology, come together to share their acquired wisdom.

The 1st Yoko International Conference was held on Oct 30 to Nov 1, 1986. The theme was "Creating the future of mankind."

The 2nd Yoko International Conference was held on Oct 28 to Nov 1, 1989. The theme was "What does it mean to be human?"

The 3rd Yoko International Conference was held on Aug 18 to Aug 21, 1999. The theme was "Life and environment."

The 4th Yoko International Conference was held on September 18 to Sep 21, 2005. The theme was "Science and religion in the age of crisis."

The 5th Yoko International Conference was supposed to be held on November 20–23, 2011. The theme was "Coexistence between nature and human beings: viewed through agriculture". It was cancelled due to the Great East Japan Earthquake.

== Reception ==
Sukyo Mahikari members have been involved in charity and social services around the world, such as in Côte d'Ivoire and Senegal (planting of trees and revival of national parks), in Angola (activities for children, elderly people, and beautify urban areas) and in both New York and Hawaii (for environmental cleanup activities).

In 2000, Sukyo Mahikari co-sponsored the UN Millennium Summit of World Religious Leaders.

In August 2004, Los Angeles mayor James Hahn presented Sukyo Mahikari of North America with a proclamation commending the organization for its efforts in helping to create a peaceful and harmonious society.

In September 2009, Mayor Mufi Hannemann of Honolulu presented Sukyo Mahikari with a certificate declaring September 27 as Sukyo Mahikari Day in Honolulu in recognition of beach and park cleanup activities that the organization has conducted there over the past ten years.

On May 6, 2010, the New York Center of Sukyo Mahikari was presented with a High Performance Building Plaque from The New York State Energy Research and Development Authority (NYSERDA) in pursuing a LEED (Leadership in Energy and Environmental Design) Silver rating from the U.S. Green Buildings Council. The plaque was given in recognition of energy-efficient measures incorporated into the new center that will help cut its energy costs by $8,400 per year and reduce its carbon footprint in New York City.

Sukyo Mahikari Day in Brazil is officially celebrated every year on February 27. This observance was designated in August 2013 by the city and state of São Paulo, and was subsequently adopted by the city and state of Rio de Janeiro in October 2014.

In 2014, an award for excellence in reforestation activities was presented to Sukyo Mahikari by the President of Côte d'Ivoire. The award was in recognition of the reforestation activities of the Sukyo Mahikari youth members of Africa. At the presentation ceremony in Takayama, the award was presented on behalf of the president by Côte d'Ivoire's Minister for Environment, Water and Forests, Mr. Mathieu Babaud Darret.

Since 2016, Sukyo Mahikari was granted special consultative status with the United Nations Economic and Social Council (ECOSOC).

In 1991, Catherine Cornille writes in a research paper that the attrition rate is high. She also states "The emphasis on miracles and magic in Mahikari, on the other hand, accounts for the large turnover of members..."

Sukyo Mahikari has also been widely viewed as a cult. According to former senior member Garry Greenwood, much of the Protocols of the Elders of Zion have been incorporated into the organization's doctrine, and its emphasis on healing with light instead of modern medicine has been described as "dangerous".

== See also ==
- Hikaru Museum
- Mahikari movement
- World Divine Light
- Japanese new religions
- Religions of Japan
- Johrei
