= Mahikari movement =

Japanese new religious movement

Mahikari
- 真光
- Type: Japanese new religion
- Founder: Kōtama Okada
- Origin: 1959
- Separations: World Divine Light, a.k.a. Sekai Mahikari Bunmei Kyōdan (世界真光文明教団); Sukyo Mahikari (崇教眞光); Yokoshi Tomo no Kai (陽光子友乃会); Mahikari Seihō no Kai (真光正法之會); Subikari (ス光)

The Mahikari movement (真光, Mahikari; lit. 'True Light') is a group of Japanese new religions (shinshūkyō) that was founded in 1959 by Yoshikazu Okada (1901–1974). The movement currently consists of various splinter organizations; the largest ones are currently World Divine Light in Izu and Sukyo Mahikari in Takayama. Both of these organizations refer to their headquarters as Suza (主座) ("God's throne"), since they are the shrines for the supreme Su-god (ス神, su-kami). Both organizations also refer to their spiritual leader as Oshienushi or Oshienushi-sama (教え主[様]).

== Foundation ==
The original Mahikari organization was founded by Kōtama Okada (born Yoshikazu Okada) in 1959. The organization was originally named L. H. Yokoshi no Tomo (陽光子友乃会, Yokoshi Tomo no Kai, "Lucky, Healthy, Association of Bright / Positive People").

== Beliefs ==
Kōtama Okada claimed that his role involved spreading God's Light and the universal principles to humanity.

The art of True Light is a practice meant to purify one's spiritual aspect as an expedient toward attaining happiness. Radiating Light from the palm of the hand is a method of purification that cleanses the spirit, mind and body, and is said to help open the way to resolving all manner of problems. Okada spent much of his time in the early days of the organization giving Light to people throughout Japan. In 1973, he visited Europe, and the art of True Light started spreading throughout the world.

Kōtama Okada believed that if people lived in accordance with "universal principles," they would cultivate their spirituality, and naturally come to use science and technology that was integrated with an understanding of spirituality, to find solutions to pressing issues facing humanity. Mahikari encourages people to incorporate these universal or divine principles in their daily life by practicing virtues such as altruistic love, gratitude, humility and acceptance of the will of God. Kōtama Okada proclaimed the fundamental tenet of the organization, "The origin of the earth is one, the origin of the universe is one, the origin of humankind is one, and the origin of all religions is one." He emphasized that all human beings share a common origin and that people should work together to create a peaceful world of love and harmony, transcending the barriers of religious denomination, nationality, ideology, and so on.

Okada claimed that God has a plan ("the divine plan"), and in preparation for a heaven-like civilization on earth, the world was entering a time of great upheaval. Okada said that an increase in what he called the spiritual energy of fire would result in abnormal weather phenomena such as flooding, fires, and water shortages, and encouraged people to transition from a way of life based on excessive materialism to a sustainable way of life in harmony with the environment and universal principles.

== Texts ==
The fundamental teachings of Mahikari appear in The Holy Words (御聖言, Goseigen) and The Yōkōshi Prayer Book (陽光子祈言集, Yōkōshi Norigoto-shū) (lit. 'Prayerbook of the Sunshine Children'). Other books Mahikari doctrinal books include Mioshie-shū (御教え集, "Holy Teachings" and Mahikari shokyū kenshū sankō-sho (真光初級研修参考書, "Mahikari Primary Training Reference Book").

== Mahikari organizations ==
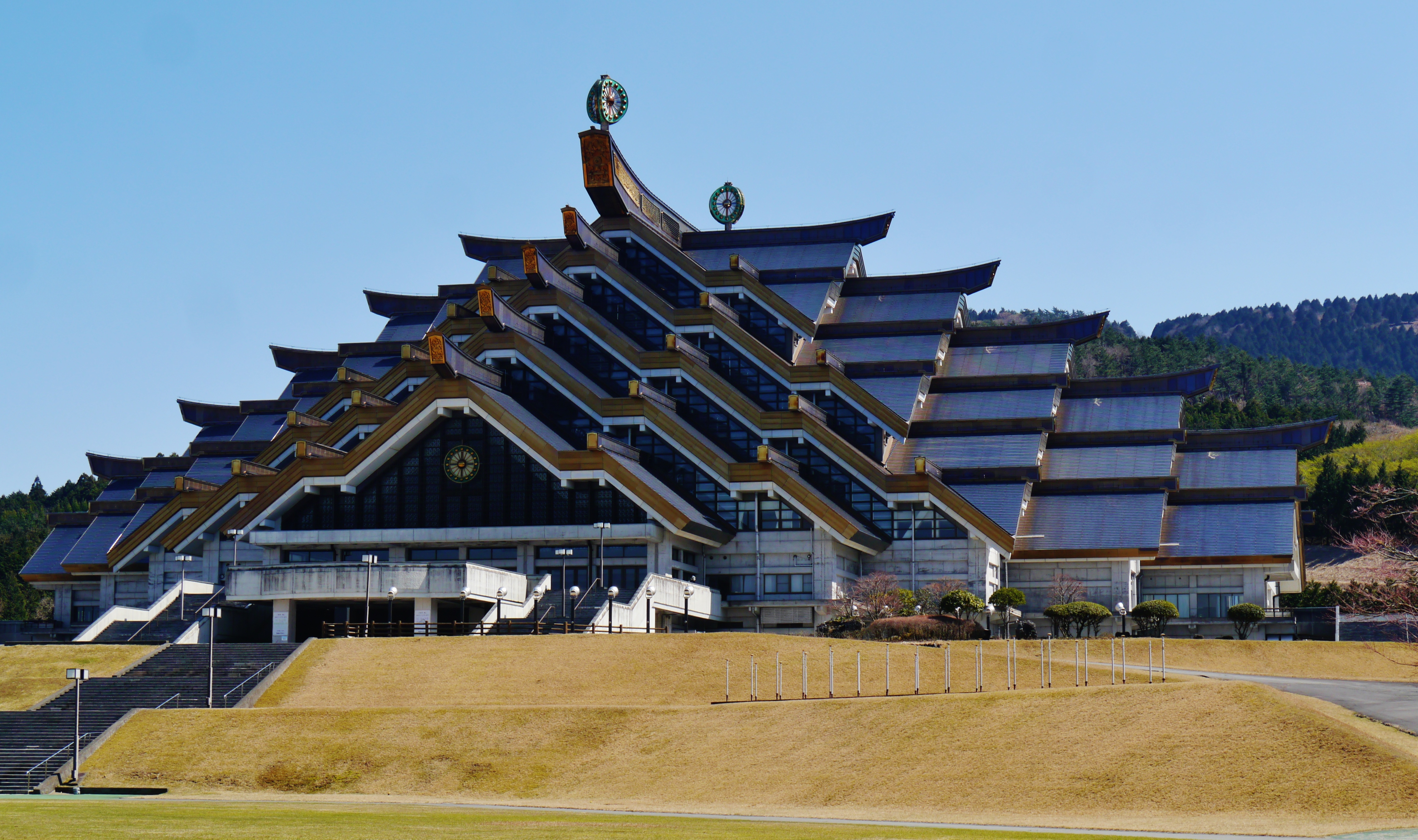
World Divine Light's headquarters in Izu

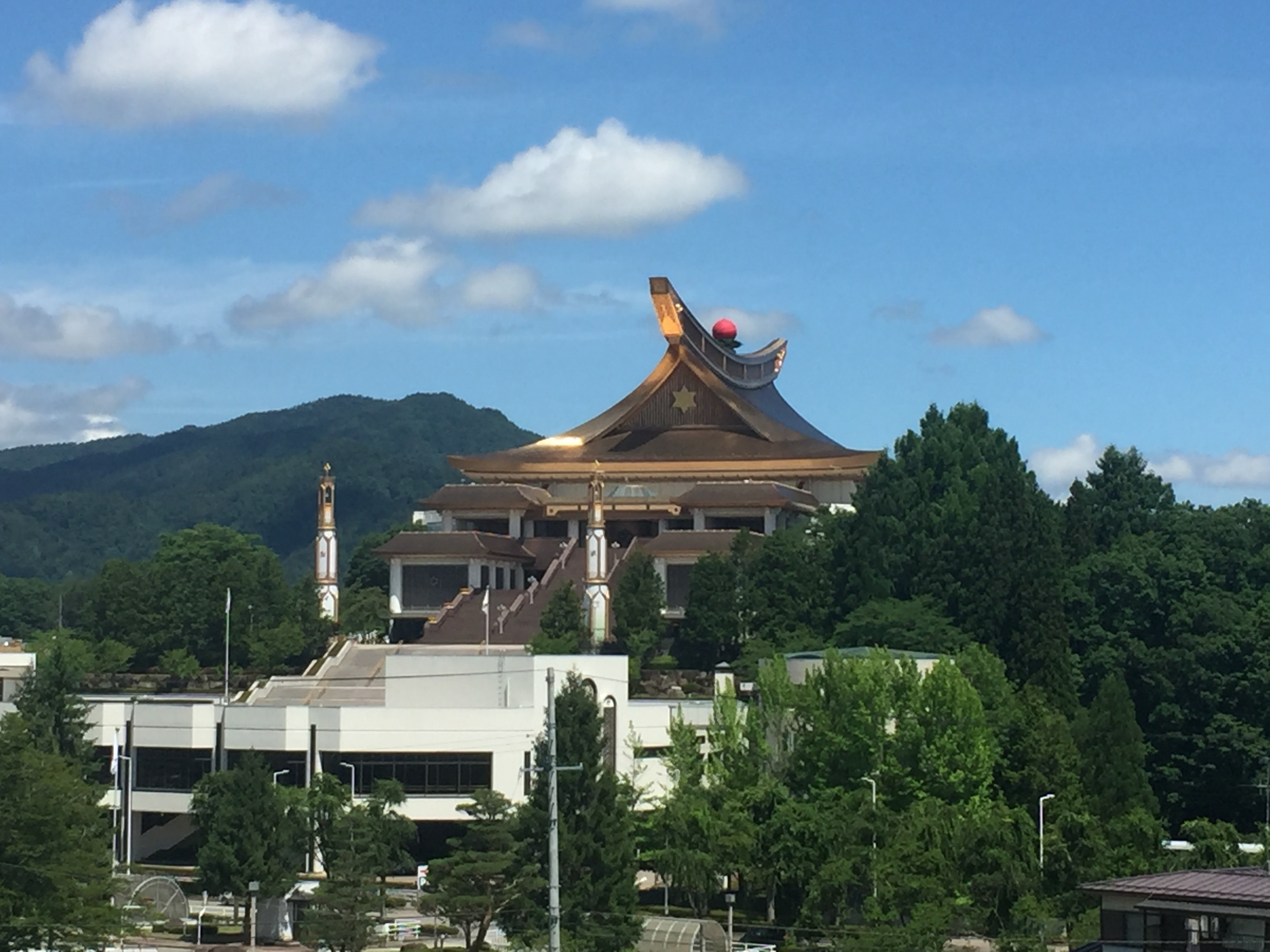
Sukyo Mahikari's headquarters in Takayama

On Kōtama Okada's death in 1974, several followers claimed to be the next spiritual leader, or oshienushi (教え主). Sakae Sekiguchi was selected by the leadership of Sekai Mahikari Bunmei Kyodan, but Keishu Okada, the adopted daughter of Kōtama Okada, contested the appointment in an ultimately unsuccessful court case that lasted eight years. On June 23, 1978, Keishu Okada announced the establishment of Sukyo Mahikari, while Sekai Mahikari Bunmei Kyodan is now known outside Japan as World Divine Light. Around 85% of the original membership moved to Sukyo Mahikari, with 15% remaining in World Divine Light.

=== Sekai Mahikari Bunmei Kyodan ===
Sekai Mahikari Bunmei Kyodan, also known as World Divine Light (WDL) outside Japan, is headquartered in the mountainous interior of Izu, Shizuoka. Its main temple is the Su-Za World Sōhonzan (主座世界総本山, Suza Sekai Sōhonzan), which is often simply known as the "Su-Za" (主座 / ス座).

Outside Japan, it calls itself the World Divine Light Organization to distinguish itself from Sukyo Mahikari. World Divine Light has branches in Houston, Los Angeles, Santa Ana, New York, Chicago, Honolulu, and Vancouver.

The organization's spiritual leader is known as the Oshienushi (教え主) or Oshienushi-sama (教え主様):

- First Oshienushi: Kotama Okada (岡田光玉; 1901–1974) (divine name: Seiō 聖鳳)
- Second Oshienushi: Sakae Sekiguchi (関口榮; 3 March 1909 – 1994)
- Third Oshienushi: Katsutoshi Sekiguchi (関口勝利; 1 September 1939–) (current leader)

=== Sukyo Mahikari ===
Sukyo Mahikari is headquartered in Takayama, Gifu. Its headquarters is also known as the World Shrine (世界の本尊, Sekai no Honzon).

=== Others ===
Other organizations with relatively minor membership that stem from Mahikari include Yokoshi Tomonokai (陽光子友乃会), Mahikari Seihō no Kai (真光正法之會), Subikari (ス光), Shin-Yu-Gen Kyusei Mahikari, and so on.

== Organizations with similarities ==
Other religious organizations that have similarities include Sekai Kyūsei Kyō (the Church of World Messianity, which Kōtama Okada was originally a follower of) and Oomoto. In Sekai Kyūsei Kyō, a practice called Jōrei (purification of the spirit) is undertaken. Similarly in Mahikari, okiyome (お浄め) ("purifying"), also known as tekazashi (手かざし) ("laying of hands"), which involves radiating divine Light from a high dimension emanated from the Creator God. This Light is said to purify the spirit, mind, and body, of human beings and is made possible through a divine pendant called Omitama.

== See also ==
- Japanese new religions
- New religious movement
- Religions of Japan
