= World Divine Light =

Japanese religious organization

- 世界真光文明教団
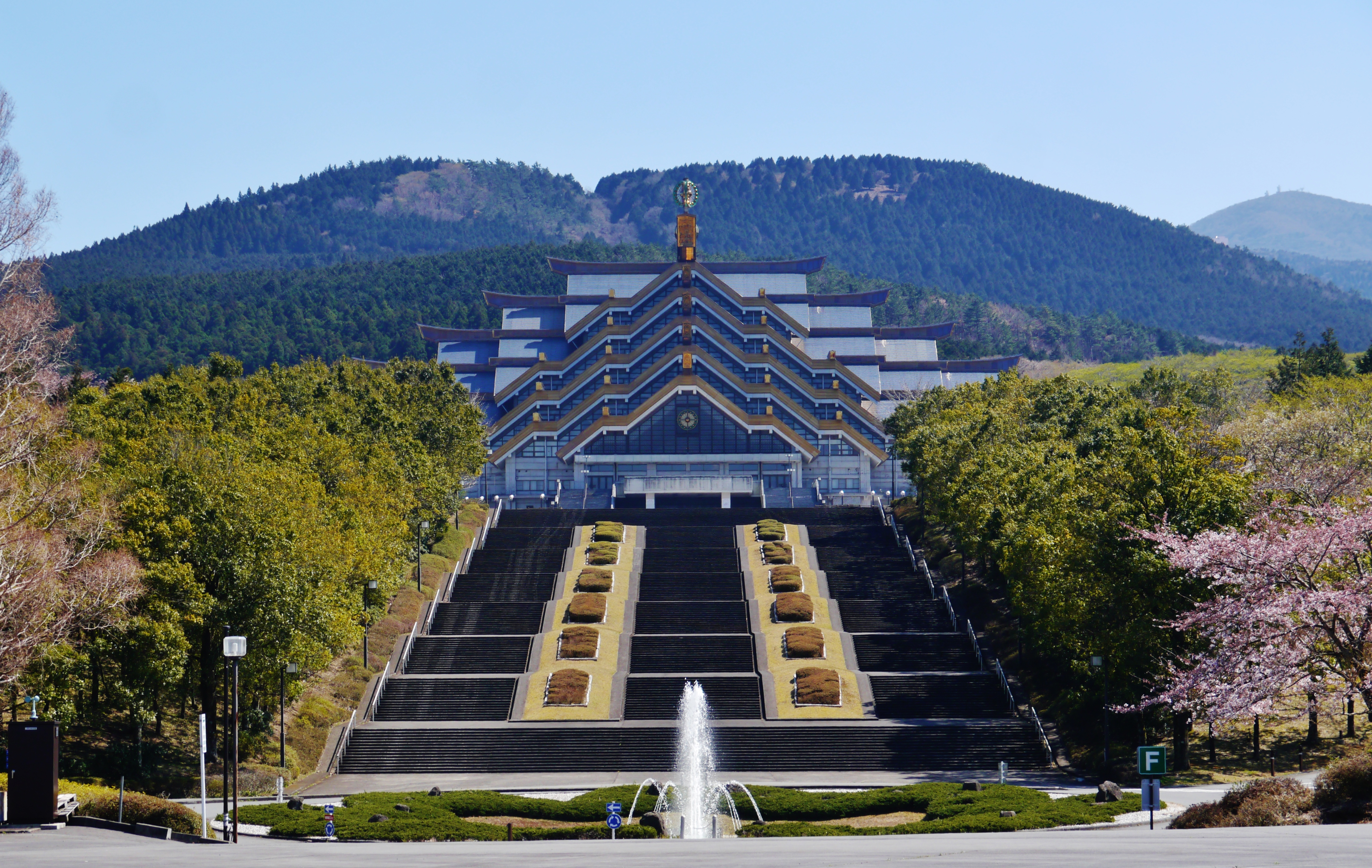
- Su-Za World Sōhonzan, the religion's headquarters
- Type: Japanese new religion
- Oshienushi: Katsutoshi Sekiguchi (関口勝利)
- Headquarters: Hiekawa, Izu, Shizuoka, Japan
- Founder: Sakae Sekiguchi (関口榮)
- Origin: 1963
- Branched from: Mahikari
- Other name: World Divine Light Organization
- Official website: www.mahikari.or.jp (in Japanese) worlddivinelight.org (in English)

World Divine Light (世界真光文明教団, Sekai Mahikari Bunmei Kyōdan), or the World Divine Light Organization (WDL), is a Japanese new religion (shinshūkyō). It is one of the Mahikari movement religions. Its headquarters, the Su-Za World Sōhonzan, is the largest of its kind in the Izu Peninsula.

World Divine Light is the original Mahikari religion founded by Kōtama Okada (born Yoshikazu Okada) in 1959. Outside Japan, it calls itself the World Divine Light (WDL) Organization, whereas in Japan it is known as Sekai Mahikari Bunmei Kyōdan or simply Mahikari (真光). The organization was registered in 1963, and in 1974 Sakae Sekiguchi became the Oshienushi or spiritual leader upon Okada's death. On the other hand, Sukyo Mahikari was established as an offshoot in 1978 by Keishu Okada after she lost the court case for control of Sekai Mahikari Bunmei Kyodan.

== Spiritual leadership ==
The organization's spiritual leader is known as the Oshienushi (教え主) or Oshienushi-sama (教え主様):

- First Oshienushi: Kotama Okada (岡田光玉; 1901–1974) (divine name: Seiō 聖鳳)
- Second Oshienushi: Sakae Sekiguchi (関口榮; 3 March 1909 – 1994)
- Third Oshienushi: Katsutoshi Sekiguchi (関口勝利; 1 September 1939–) (current leader)

== Locations ==
In Japan, Sekai Mahikari Bunmei Kyōdan is headquartered in Hiekawa (冷川), Izu, Shizuoka, located in the mountainous interior of the Izu Peninsula. Its main temple is the Su-Za World Sōhonzan (主座世界総本山, Suza Sekai Sōhonzan), which is often simply known as the "Su-Za" (主座 / ス座) ("Su" is the name of God, while 座 literally means 'seat'.).

Outside Japan, it calls itself the World Divine Light Organization or WDL to distinguish itself from Sukyo Mahikari. World Divine Light has branches in Houston, Los Angeles, Santa Ana, New York, Chicago, Honolulu, and Vancouver.
