= Mokichi Okada =

Founder of the Church of World Messianity

- 岡田茂吉
- Mokichi Okada
- Title: Meshiya-sama (メシヤ様); Meishū-sama (明主様)

Personal life
- Born: 23 December 1882 Asakusa, Tokyo, Japan
- Died: 10 February 1955 (aged 72)

Religious life
- Religion: Church of World Messianity

Mokichi Okada (岡田茂吉 Okada Mokichi; 23 December 1882 – 10 February 1955) was the founder of the World Church of Messiah, that later became the Church of World Меssianity. He also acted as the spiritual leader of Shumei and the Johrei Fellowship. He is known by his followers by the honorific title Meshiya-sama (メシヤ様; lit. 'Messiah') or Meishū-sama (明主様; lit. 'Lord of Light'). He is the founder of Johrei, an energy healing ritual that uses "divine light" to dissolve the spiritual impurities that are understood to be the source of all physical, emotional, and personal problems.

== Biography ==
=== Early life ===
According to his official biography, Okada was born to a poor Buddhist family in Asakusa, Tokyo and, after many trials and tribulations, eventually made his fortune in the jewellery business. His success was short-lived however. After losing his wife, children and then business following an economic downturn and the Great Kanto Earthquake, he started to question the pursuit of material success. He remarried and went on to have further children but spurred on to find the answers he sought, he turned to religion to explore and express the spiritual aspect of life.

=== Spiritual awakening ===
He was initially a follower of the Shinto offshoot Oomoto, a new religion that taught that the much anticipated Age of Light was approaching, where he became popular as a spiritual healer who practiced chinkon kishin. In 1926 at the age of 45, Okada told his followers that he had received enlightenment and with it, a special revelation from God about the dawn of the Age of Light and his mission as a saviour of the people who were suffering. This later led him to found a further new religion to spread the teachings he received on establishing paradise on earth and creating a new civilisation.

=== Teachings ===
Okada talked and wrote extensively about Paradise on Earth and God's Will for humanity – health, wealth and happiness – that we may live in peace and harmony with nature, each other and ourselves. He summarised his teachings in three pillars – the Art of Healing, the Art of Beauty, and the Art of Nature.

In terms of healing, the main teaching that he shared was that of Johrei – channelling God's Divine Light of Purification to clear the spirit of a person or place to establish a paradise-like state of health, abundance and happiness. He taught the importance of the spiritual world, and that what happens in the spiritual world precedes events and outcomes in the physical domain. His premise of healing with light is that clouds developed in the spiritual realm when suffering occurred, which caused physical disease or accidents. If these "clouds" are cleared by Divine Light, then there would be no opportunity for the harm to occur.

Okada valued art as a way to keep the spirits lifted and clear the viewer's spirit through appreciation of beauty. He also taught natural farming methods to keep food pure and as nature intended to ensure that the body did not have to deal with chemicals which could cause a build up of toxins in the body. He also taught the need to study nature and to understand the laws of nature, and how to live in better harmony with nature.

Okada wrote and spoke extensively about his relationship with God and encouraged his followers to deepen their faith and dedication, and to develop their characters with truth, virtue and beauty.

He wrote many poems, prayers, books, and articles. Only a small selection of them have been translated from Japanese into other languages.

=== Initial organizations ===
In 1935 he established the Japan Kannon Society, a religious organization that allowed him to talk a little about God, prayer, spiritual matters and continue to share his approach to spiritual healing with his followers within the parameters of traditional Japanese religious beliefs. But due to political restrictions on religious organizations at the time, Okada opted to develop a parallel medical route to expound his discoveries. In 1936 he established the "Japan Health Association” in Koujimachi, Tokyo and he soon expanded to open a rehabilitation center focusing on the healing powers of light combined with Japanese massage and traditional hands on healing therapies, similar to what he had experienced in Oomoto. But in the same year it was shut down as a violation of the Medical Practitioners' Law (医師法違反).

=== Sacred grounds and art museum ===
In 1944 he moved to Gora, Hakone, and the following year he there started construction of Shinsenkyō, the sacred grounds, as a prototype of paradise on Earth. In 1945 he also started the construction of a second sacred ground, Zuiunkyō (瑞雲郷), in Atami. He also initiated the construction of the third and final of his sacred grounds, Heiankyō in Kyoto.

While in Hakone, he started collecting national treasures of art and culture that he displayed there to the public in the Hakone Museum of Art that was completed in 1952.

=== World Church of Messiah ===
After WWII, the restrictions on religious freedom were dropped and in 1950, Okada established Sekai Meshiya Kyô, the World Church of Messiah. The purpose of this, was to bring the presence of the spirit of Messiah to all humanity. His intention, he said, was always to establish such an organization. He explained that he had only followed a medical route early on, because there was little freedom at the time for him to practice a new religion.

Okada was a strong proponent of culture, religion and art from around the world and read the Bible and Quran. He went on to develop links with Christianity within his religious community, teaching his choir to sing Handel's Messiah's Halleluiah chorus and saying that his organization would work "in concert with Christianity". This Western influence proved unpopular with his original followers, and after his death it was dropped from the teachings shared amongst the community. Later, the church was renamed as the Church of World Messianity, 世界救世教 Sekai Kyūsei Kyō, in 1957.

In 1954, Okada completed the sacred grounds at Atami. However, in the same year he experienced a brain hemorrhage and almost died. As he started to recover, he told his close followers that he had received a miraculous blessing from God and had been born again as a Messiah. He said that he was born again of the spirit by God in Heaven. As a consequence, his skin was like that of a newborn baby, and even his hair dresser had said his hair was soft like that of a newborn and had regained its colour. Due to the controversial nature of these statements, they were largely hidden from the public.

=== Death ===
In 1955 he died, and left the church in the care of his wife. His followers honoured his death as his ascension into heaven.

== Family ==
Okada's second wife Yoshi Okada became Nidai-Sama (second spiritual leader) upon his death, as she inherited the seat of Kyoshu, spiritual leader of the church. With the death of Nidai-Sama, the title of Kyoshu passed to the couple's daughter, Itsuki Okada, who came to be called Sandai Kyoshu-Sama (Third Spiritual Leader) by the faithful until her abdication and replacement on the seat by her nephew, Yoichi Okada, now Yondai Kyoshu-Sama (Fourth Spiritual Leader). Sandai-Sama was responsible for establishing the Sanguetsu Academy, which works to improve the Japanese flower arranging technique of ikebana for the Messianic Church. Yoichi is Okada's grandson, and he has a son, Masaaki, who is also active in the church leadership.

Okada’s second daughter, Miya Yoshioka (Miya-sama) was born in 1925 as officially became a member of the Okada Official Spiritual Lineage in 1975. Also demonstrating exceptional ability in the ceramic arts and ikebana (art of flower arrangement), she held a love for the arts throughout her life until she died in 2017 at the age of 91.

Okasa’s fourth son, Kunihiro Okada was born in 1932 and assumed his position in Okada’s Official Spiritual Lineage in 1975. Inheriting Okada’s ability in the arts, he demonstrated outstanding sensibility in fields such as metal craft and ceramics.

== Legacy ==
Okada's work was very influential in the areas of Nature Farming, Japanese flower arranging, and art collecting in Japan, while his spiritual influence lives on through various religious organisations. A two-volume biography about him called Tōhō no hikari (東方の光) ("Light from the East") was published in 1994.

=== Sangetsu ===
The Sangetsu (山月) school of ikebana, inspired by Mokichi Okada, was founded in June 1972. The Mokichi Okada Association (MOA) was established in 1980 to continue his work "toward the creation of a new civilization to be undertaken without confining Okada's principles and their implementation within a religious framework" (MOA acquired the status of a legal entity as a limited liability intermediary corporation in 2005, then transferred to one of general corporation in 2009, officially called MOA International Corporation). Much of Okada's extensive art collection is now housed in the MOA Museum of Art in Atami, Japan.

=== Nature Farming ===
In 1936, Okada established an agricultural system originally called "no fertilizer farming" or "Nature Farming". Offshoots such as the Sekai Kyusei Kyo, promoting "Kyusei nature farming", and the Mokichi Okada Association formed after his death to continue promoting the work in Japan and South-East Asia.

According to the International Nature Farming Research Center in Nagano, Japan, it is based on the theories that:

- Fertilizers pollute the soil and weaken its power of production.
- Pests would break out from the excessive use of fertilizers
- The difference in disease incidence between resistant and susceptible plants is attributed to nutrition conditions inside the body.
- Vegetables and fruits produced by nature farming taste better than those by chemical farming.

== See also ==
- Masanobu Fukuoka
- Kōtama Okada
- Organic farming
- No-till farming
