= Kōtama Okada =

Japanese founder of the Mahikari religious movement

- 岡田 光玉

Personal life
- Born: Yoshikazu Okada (岡田 良一); 27 February 1901 Minato, Tokyo
- Died: 23 June 1974 (aged 73) Japan
- Children: Keishu Okada (岡田恵珠)
- Known for: Founding the Mahikari movement

Religious life
- Religion: Mahikari

Kōtama Okada (岡田 光玉; birth name: Yoshikazu Okada 岡田 良一; born February 27, 1901, Minato, Tokyo; died June 23, 1974) was the founder of the Mahikari new religious movement (shinshūkyō) in Japan. Today, both Sukyo Mahikari and World Divine Light recognize him as the founder of their religions.

== Biography ==
Yoshikazu Okada was born on February 27, 1901 in the Aoyama area of Tokyo's Minato Ward. He was born into a wealthy family as the son of Inasaburo, a major general in the Imperial Japanese Army. Okada, who studied with Prince Chichibu (Yasuhito) and others who came from prominent Japanese families, graduated from the Japanese Army Officer Training School in 1922 and was commissioned a lieutenant in the Japanese Imperial Guard. After serving in military campaigns in China and Indochina, Okada retired from the army in 1941 due to a back injury with the rank of lieutenant colonel.

On the morning of February 27, 1959, Okada received a divine revelation from the Su-god, who told him, "The time of heaven has come. Rise. Your name shall be Kōtama 光玉 ("jewel of light"). Raise your hand. The world has entered severe times." This event marked the founding of the Mahikari religious movement.

Originally a follower of Sekai Kyūsei Kyō, Okada established L. H. Yokoshi no Tomo in 1959, and in 1963, registered a religious organisation under the name "Sekai Mahikari Bunmei Kyodan."

== Legacy ==
In 1974, after Okada's death, there were court hearings held over eight years. After an amicable settlement was reached (wakai), Sakae Sekiguchi assumed the leadership of Sekai Mahikari Bunmei Kyodan (now known outside Japan as the World Divine Light Organization), and Keishu Okada established Sukyo Mahikari.

== Selected books ==
- Okada, Kōtama 岡田光玉. 1967. Mioshieshū 御教え集 [Holy Teachings]. Tōkyō: Seikai Mahikari Bunmei Kyōdan.
- Okada, Kōtama 岡田光玉. 1969. Goseigen 御聖言 [Holy Words]. Tōkyō: Seikai Mahikari Bunmei Kyōdan.
- Okada, Kōtama 岡田光玉. 1973a. Gokyōji senshū 1 御教示選集 [Anthology of Holy Teachings 1]. Tōkyō: Yōkōbunmei Kenkyūkai.
- Okada, Kōtama 岡田光玉. 1973b. Yōkōshi norigoto-shū 陽光子祈言集 [Prayerbook of the Sunshine Children]. Tōkyō: Seikai Mahikari Bunmei Kyōdan.

== See also ==
- Japanese new religions
- Mokichi Okada
