= Lu Zhankui =

Chinese warlord

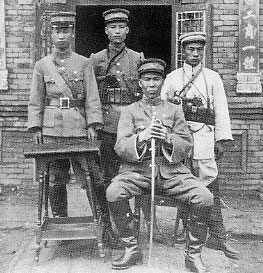
Lu Zhankui in the front of the photo.

Lu Zhankui was an Inner Mongolian officer under the Manchuria based warlord Zhang Zuolin. In 1917, he was responsible for negotiations with the Chinese government on behalf of his Independence Army, the Dulidui. He was instrumental in bringing Oomoto leader Onisaburo Deguchi, and Aikido founder Morihei Ueshiba, to Mongolia in 1924, but was captured along with them and executed by firing squad in Tongliao.
