= Michi no Shiori =

Oomoto religious text written by Onisaburo Deguchi

- 道の栞

Information
- Religion: Oomoto
- Author: Onisaburo Deguchi
- Language: Japanese
- Period: 1905
- Chapters: 4

Michi no Shiori (Japanese: 道の栞; lit. "Signposts along the Way") is a religious text written by Onisaburo Deguchi, the co-founder of the Japanese religious organization Oomoto. Composed in 1904 and published in 1905, it was one of Onisaburo Deguchi's earliest written works.

== Contents ==
Michi no Shiori was first published in May 1905 as a series of 14 volumes composed by Onisaburo Deguchi in 1904 at Ayabe. In 1925, these 14 volumes were republished as a single book. Michi no Shiori explains that the various kami are manifestations of the single Great Source (Supreme God of the Universe). It also contains criticisms of the Russo-Japanese War.

The current Japanese-language edition is a 1985 revision of the 1925 edition. The 1985 edition has 4 parts:

- Part 1 (3 sections)
- Part 2 (3 sections)
- Part 3 (2 sections)
- Part 4 (3 sections)

== Translations ==
An abridged international edition of Michi no Shiori with 792 numbered paragraphs has been translated into Esperanto, and subsequently from the Esperanto edition into Brazilian Portuguese and English.

- Esperanto: Diaj Vojsignoj (1997), translated from Japanese by Shigeki Maeda
- Portuguese: Rumos Divinos (1997), translated from Shigeki Maeda's 1997 Esperanto edition by Benedito Silva
- English: Divine Signposts, translated from Shigeki Maeda's 1997 Esperanto edition by Charles Rowe

The abridged international edition has 4 parts. The dates given below are lunar calendar dates.

- Part 1 (3 chapters)
  - Chapter 1: verses 1–80, 9 April 1904
  - Chapter 2: verses 81–151, 12 April 1904 (contains a theological overview of God)
  - Chapter 3: verses 152–222, 15 April 1904
- Part 2 (3 chapters)
  - Chapter 1: verses 223–303
  - Chapter 2: verses 304–390
  - Chapter 2: verses 391–421
- Part 3 (2 chapters)
  - Chapter 1: verses 422–477, 13 May 1904
  - Chapter 2: verses 478–557, 1 June 1904
- Part 4 (4 chapters)
  - Chapter 1: verses 558–602 (mentions some pilgrimage sites)
  - Chapter 2: verses 603–646
  - Chapter 3: verses 647–719
  - Chapter 4: verses 720–792, 30 October 1904
- Addendum

== Theology ==
In Michi no Shiori, there are three elements of God (in Japanese: Heavenly Emperor (天帝, Tentei); also referred to in the text as Ame-no-Minakanushi 天の御中主) that pervade the universe: spirit (魂), power (力), and body (身). Deguchi's three divine elements are derived from Honda Chikaatsu (本田親徳)'s Theorems of the Great Three (三大学則, sandai gakusoku), which are divine body (体, karada), energy (力, chikara), and spirit (霊, rei).

1. Spirit (4 qualities) (四魂)
  1. Activity (勇)
  2. Harmony (親)
  3. Love (愛) (Kami-musubi)
  4. Wisdom (智) (Takami-musubi)
2. Power (8 powers) (八力)
  1. Movement (動力)
  2. Rest (静力)
  3. Dissolution (解力)
  4. Coagulation (凝力)
  5. Tension (引力)
  6. Relaxation (弛力)
  7. Combination (合力)
  8. Separation (分力)
3. Body (身体) (3 functions) (三つの体)
  1. Solidity (剛体) (essence of minerals 山物の本質)
  2. Softness (柔体) (essence of plants 植物の本質)
  3. Fluidity (流体) (essence of animals 動物の本質)

== See also ==
- Reikai Monogatari
