= Reikai Monogatari =

Japanese religious text dictated by Onisaburo Deguchi

- 霊界物語
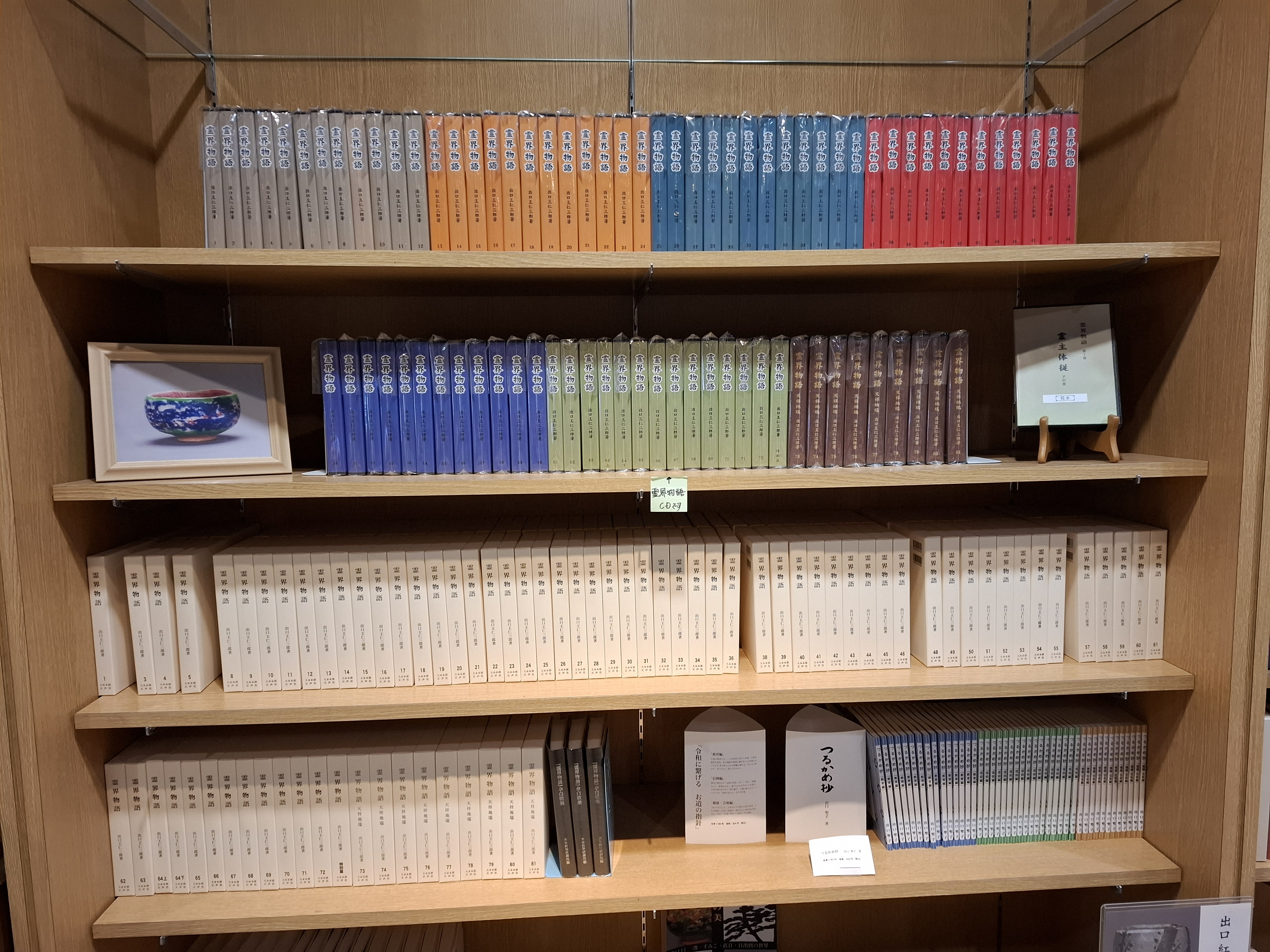
- Reikai Monogatari volumes sold at the Oomoto headquarters store in Kameoka

Information
- Religion: Oomoto
- Author: Onisaburo Deguchi (出口 王仁三郎)
- Language: Japanese
- Period: 1921–1926 (vols. 1–72); 1933–1934 (vols. 73–81)
- Books: 83 (containing 81 Volumes)

Reikai Monogatari (Japanese: 霊界物語; English translation: Tales of the Spirit World or Tales from the Spirit World) is a religious text in the form of a novel, dictated by Onisaburo Deguchi (Japanese: 出口王仁三郎), the co-founder of the Japanese religious organization Oomoto.

The work consists of 81 volumes contained in 83 books, the discrepancy being due to Volume 64 being contained in two books, plus the inclusion of a special edition book about Onisaburo Deguchi's expedition to Mongolia. The first 72 volumes were written between 1921 and 1926, and the remaining 9 volumes between 1933 and 1934.

Some devout Oomoto followers will read through the entire work, often taking a year to do so. Reading the text out aloud is believed to confer spiritual benefits.

== Background to creation ==
In the 1910s, some high-ranking military officers became Oomoto followers, creating apprehension in the government of the Empire of Japan. Then in 1920 Oomoto bought a daily newspaper company and publicized a prophecy and warning of war, calamity, and social reform. As a result, Onisaburo and two executives of Oomoto were arrested and charged with lèse-majesté and violation of the Newspaper Law, and were jailed in February 1921. After being detained for 126 days, Onisaburo was released from prison in June 1921 and returned to Oomoto's headquarter in Ayabe. These events are called the First Oomoto Incident.

Subsequently, on 8 October 1921, Onisaburo stated that he had been given a divine direction to "make public the state of the Spirit World which the God had revealed in the lunar calendar February of the 31st year of the Meiji Era." (This was 1898 in the Christian Era calendar, a year in which Onisaburo had practised seven-days of spiritual asceticism.) Furthermore, the divine spirit of Nao Deguchi – the co-founder of Oomoto who had died three years previously – had also given him a stern demand about this publication. The next day, Onisaburo started dictating Reikai Monogatari.

== Dictation and publishing ==
Onisaburo's dictation of Reikai Monogatari started in October 1921 and two days later the demolition of Oomoto's central shrine ordered by the authorities started. Hearing the noise, Onisaburo continued his dictation.

Onisaburo dictated most parts of Reikai Monogatari lying on a futon (a Japanese-style mattress), without consulting any references, and without any faltering or restatement.. Selected followers transcribed his dictation, made a clean copy, read it out to Onisaburo, and then corrected any errors. In the beginning it took about ten days to dictate a volume, but as the speed of dictation and transcription increased it took only about three days. When the story took place in a cold climate, Onisaburo used a kotatsu (Japanese foot warmer), even in summer. When the story took place in a tropical climate he used a fan, even in winter. And when the character suffered pain, he suffered likewise. Tired from dictating day after day, Onisaburo sometimes started snoring in the middle of dictation. On awaking he asked the transcriber how far he had dictated. As the transcriber read back a few sentences, he resumed dictation from the last sentence.

The first 72 volumes were dictated within the five years up to June 1926, with the last nine volumes dictated from October 1933 to December 1934. But in December 1935 the publication of the completed Reikai Monogatari was prohibited by the authorities on the grounds that it desecrated the Imperial dignity. Onisaburo was imprisoned for six years and eight months in what came to be known as the Second Oomoto Incident, a thorough suppression lasting from 1935 to 1945 and unparalleled in Japan's modern history.

Since the fall of the Empire of Japan and its authorities who suppressed Oomoto in 1945, Reikai Monogatari has been republished in several editions for both Oomoto followers and for the public. The edition published from 1967 to 1971 is held in the libraries of major foreign universities, including Boston University, Moscow State University, and the University of Cambridge.

== Summary of contents ==
Onisaburo stated that in order to introduce the divine teachings widely it was necessary to use the form of a novel rather than an academic text, making Reikai Monogatari unlike other religious scriptures as it mostly consists of rhythmical tanka (a Japanese poetry of 31 syllables) and theatrical dialogues between characters. The dialogues are often comical and sprinkled with puns, wordplay, and sometimes metafictional jokes that characters in the ancient era refer to, or quote from other sections of Reikai Monogatari. Onisaburo wanted his story to be narrated with plain and simple words so that the ordinary people, rather than intellectuals, would comprehend the God's will.

In summary, Reikai Monogatari tells of how all things were created and evolved by the God of Great Origin, a Spirit that has been permeating the universe. However, as this Spirit's evolution is incomplete, evilness generated in various forms has caused disturbance to the order of both the Spirit and the Present World. Therefore, in order to accomplish the divine work of saving the Worlds and of bringing Heaven on Earth, the God named Kan-susanoo-no-ookami made public the divine teachings and dispatched its promoters to all over the Worlds in order to let the power and spirit of the words induce evil ones to repent. (Onisaburo defined Kan-susanoo-no-ookami as the God of Salvation which has devoted itself, with infinite mercy, to save all things both in the Spirit and Present World.)

Reikai Monogatari contains a wide range of themes: the creation of the universe; the divinity of the supreme God; the status, relations, and activities of Gods; the origin of the emergence of Oomoto; the relationship between gods and human beings; the true state of the Spirit World; the theory of life, of philosophy, of religion, of politics, of economics, of ideology, of education, and of art; the imperishability of spirit; and accounts of incidents in both the past of 350,000 years ago and in the modern times of the 1920s, as well as prophecies about the future in the 50th century. It also contains myths concerning the histories of continents and parts of the world corresponding to the Ryukyu Islands and Taiwan, as well as modern-day Iran, India, Sri Lanka, Africa, South America, and Australia.

The doctrine preached in Reikai Monogatari highlights the fallacies of existing philosophies, religions, and ideologies, and denounces the despotism generated from egoism and the oppression and exploitation of a certain race. It also admonishes people's depravity and indolence, and aims to inspire all human beings to be restored as "Child of God, Shrine of God" and to co-exist in mutual prosperity, in a world reconstructed under an order based upon the Supreme God's will.

== Outline of volumes ==
The volumes of the Reikai Monogatari focus on particular topics and stories, as follows:

- Volumes 1–36
  - Volume 1 (1st half): Onisaburo's training at Mount Takakuma and exploration of the spirit world
  - Volume 1 (2nd half) to Volume 4: The founder's seclusion
  - Volume 5 and Volume 6 (1st half): The great flood, the creation of the country
  - Volume 6 (2nd half) to Volume 12: The birth of the gods, the Battle of Yomihirasaka 黄泉比良坂のい, Princess Oki 大気津姫, and the opening of the Heavenly Rock Cave 天の岩戸開き
  - Volume 13 to Volume 15: In the country of Persia/"Fusa" フサの国 (modern Iran), the first appearance of characters who will be important in future volumes
  - Volume 16 to Volume 35: The story of the governance of Nishikinomiya 錦の宮, the story of Takahime 高姫, the story of Tanba 丹波
  - Volume 24 to Volume 25: The story of Ryūgū-jima 竜宮島 (modern Australia)
  - Volume 27 (2nd half): The story of the Ryukyu Islands
  - Volume 28: The story of Taiwan
  - Volume 29 to Volume 33: The story of Takasago-jima 高砂島 (modern South America)
  - Volume 34 to Volume 35: The story of Tsukushi-jima 筑紫島 (modern Africa)
  - Volume 36: Set in Shiro-jima シロの島 (modern Ceylon)
- Volumes 37–72 (Journey to Mongolia 入蒙記)
  - Volume 37 to Volume 38: Autobiography of Onisaburo from his youth
  - Volume 39 to Volume 72: The story of the governance of Iso's mansion, the story of the subjugation of the Great Black Lord 大黒主. Set in the country of Persia フサの国 to the country of Tsuki [Moon] 月の国 (modern Iran to India).
  - Volume 60 (2nd half): The Three Beautiful Songs 三美歌, various prayers 祝詞, and the Three / Five Divine Revelations 三五神諭
  - Volume 61 to Volume 62: Oomoto Hymn 大本讃美歌
  - Volume 64 (parts 1 and 2): Set in modern-day Jerusalem
  - Volume 69: Story of the political reforms in the country of Uzu ウヅの国 (modern-day Argentina)
  - Volume 70 to Volume 72: Set in the country of Tsuki [Moon] 月の国 (modern India)
  - Special Volume: Journey to Mongolia 入蒙記 – an autobiography of Onisaburo's entry into Mongolia in 1924
- Volumes 73–81 (The Prosperity of Heaven and Earth 天祥地瑞)
  - Volume 73 to Volume 75: Story of the god Taigen Akitsuo 太元顕津男
  - Volume 76 to Volume 78: Story of the god Asakahime 朝香比女
  - Volume 79 to Volume 80: Story of the land of Kayahara 葭原の国土
  - Volume 81: Story of Isako's island 伊佐子の島

== Special volumes ==
=== Volume 1 ===
The first half of Volume 1 is an account of the Spirit World which Onisaburo asserted to have witnessed and experienced during a seven-day spiritual asceticism in 1898.

=== Volumes 37 and 38 ===
Volumes 37 and 38 are Onisaburo's autobiography from 1898 to 1916, i.e. from his middle 20s to his middle 40s, in which he recounts the following.

In 1898, 26-year-old Kisaburo Ueda – Onisaburo's birth name – managed to make a living on a small dairy farm founded with his friends in his home village Anao, now in present-day Kameoka City, Kyoto Prefecture. The eldest son of an extremely poor farm family, since childhood Onisaburo had disgust for the oppression of the strong and sympathy for the weak. This led to him intervening in troubles and fights caused by local hoodlums, resulting, in March 1898, in him being severely injured. The next night Kisaburo had a mystical experience in which a strange fellow in western clothes and with a black pocketbook visited him. This fellow introduced himself as Matsuoka, an angel sent by the Goddess of Mount Fuji. Matsuoka led Kisaburo to nearby Mount Takakuma, and there, sitting upright on a rock with only an undergarment and no food or drink, Kisaburo underwent a seven-day asceticism consisting of periods of one hour in the Spirit World followed by two hours in the Present World. During this seven-day asceticism, it is said that Kisaburo reached the state of being spiritually connected with the God; had his spirit explore in Heaven, Hell, and the Present World; comprehended the truth of the universe; and perceived that he was commissioned to save the world. Onisaburo claimed that he grasped the essence of various divine capabilities including that of seeing all things at any time and any place, of knowing others' destinies, of penetrating into others' minds, and of uttering divine voices.

In August, following an order from Komatsubayashi-no-mikoto, the God possessing him, Kisaburo went to Ayabe, Kyoto and met with Nao Deguchi who was in her early sixties at that time. Six years before, Nao had been possessed by the God which named itself as Ushitora-no-konjin, proclaiming itself to be the god who would reconstruct all the world, And so, from the next year, illiterate Nao started delivering Ushitora-no-konjin's divine messages through automatic writings. Before that she had shouted the messages against her will, thus being regarded as insane by her family members and neighbours and being confined in a latticed space in her own small house.

The automatic writings conveyed various messages such as the histories and correlations of the gods, the relationships between the gods and human beings, criticism of modern society, prophecies about the reconstruction of the world, and notions of Nao herself and her followers. In 1899, the automatic writing declared that Kisaburo was the genuine one who should take care of Ushitora-no-konjin, and that the divine commission of reconstructing the world was assigned to Nao and Kisaburo. Shortly after, Kisaburo and Nao founded a new religious organization called "Kinmei Reigakkai" in Ayabe, which would develop into Oomoto. In the early years, in addition to healing the locals' diseases, Kisaburo practiced a ritual by which his trainees were put into a state of divine possession. In this ritual Kisaburo acted as Saniwa, who inquires and judges the true identity of the god possessing the trainee. In many cases, his trainees were possessed by evil spirits which pretended to be the righteous gods, and thus made the possessed perform aberrant acts.

In 1900, Kisaburo married Sumi Deguchi, the youngest daughter of Nao, who had been appointed to be the successor of Nao by the automatic writings. In 1900 and 1901, Kisaburo, Nao, Sumi and selected followers fulfilled a number of missions in compliance with the divine demands made through the automatic writings.

==== "The Opening of Oshima and Meshima" ====
Oshima (also known as Kanmurijima) and Meshima (also known as Kutsujima) were uninhabited islets in Wakasa Bay facing the Sea of Japan. Kisaburo and his followers firstly landed on Oshima and visited Oitojima Shrine and then one month later landed on Meshima, built a small shrine, and served it. According to the automatic writings, the purpose was to restore the God Kunitokotachi-no-mikoto and upright deities who had followed him. As narrated from Volume 1 to Volume 4 of Reikai Monogatari, Kunitokotachi-no-mikoto was the founder and the original sovereign of the Divine World of the Earth. He had been compelled to retreat to Meshima by evil gods and since then had secretly protected the Earth.

==== "Asceticism at Mount Kurama" ====
Besides Nao, Kisaburo, and Sumi, the follower Haruzo Shikata was also selected for asceticism. Taught by Kisaburo, this boy in his late teens excelled at supernatural capabilities. However, due to ambition and conceit he was possessed by a powerful evil god and turned into one of the fiercest opponents of Kisaburo. The automatic writings told that the purpose of the asceticism was to demand all followers to repent and to hence show an example of good and evil. But at Mount Kurama, Haruzo suffered from mysterious incidents, became severely depressed, was suddenly taken ill, and died shortly after.

==== "The Service of the Water of Moto Ise" ====
Nao, Kisaburo, Sumi and thirty-nine followers visited Koutai Shrine in present-day Fukuchiyama City, a Moto Ise Shrine said to be where the Goddess Amaterasu had been temporarily enshrined before being finally enshrined in present-day Ise Shrine. Not revealed to most of Kisaburo's followers at the time, the divine order from the automatic writing was for them to secretly draw the forbidden sacred water from the river near the Shrine. The drawn-up water was then poured into three wells in Ayabe, with Nao later pouring the rest, mixed with sacred water from Izumo-taisha, into the sea between Oshima and Meshima. She declared that this water would circulate all over the world in three years and the world would begin to move. Three years later, the Russo-Japanese War broke out.

==== "The Service of the Fire at Izumo" ====
Nao, Kisaburo, Sumi and twelve followers visited Izumo-taisha and were given sacred water and soils, as well as the fire which, according to the history of the Shrine, has been burning from the Ages of Gods. According to the automatic writings, this sacred Water and Fire would perform the function of purifying the people's spirits all over the world, and the world would be reconstructed with their protection. Kisaburo and his followers brought the fire back to Ayabe and kept it lit for one hundred days.

==== Confusion in Ayabe ====
Kisaburo changed his name to Onisaburo Deguchi in 1910, and these two Volumes also detail his two decades in Ayabe with Nao. During this time he endured the incomprehension, misunderstanding, incessant oppositions, and attempts at assassination that Nao's old followers aimed at him. Although most of Nao's followers were good-natured, they were too ignorant and superstitious, obsessed with the misconception that the God possessing Kisaburo was the evil God which opposed the God possessing Nao, and therefore was the one which must repent. Even the automatic writings had become very hostile and rebellious to Onisaburo. However, in 1916 the automatic writings declared that the God that had possessed Onisaburo was Kan-susanoo-no-ookami, and as a result Nao finally realized her own longstanding misconception.

=== Special edition volume ===
This single unnumbered volume is an account of Onisaburo's expedition in Mongolia.

Under the terms of the First Oomoto Incident, Onisaburo was obliged to obtain the authorities' permission for any journey outside Kyoto. In February 1924, ignoring this obligation he secretly headed for Mongolia with some selected disciples including Morihei Ueshiba, who later founded the martial art of Aikido. Onisaburo's wish was to establish a new kingdom in the wilderness and to form a federation of East Asian countries in preparation for the unification of the world by the construction of Heaven on Earth proclaimed in his religion.

Arriving in Mukden (present-day Shenyang City, China), Onisaburo and his party formed an alliance with Lu Zhankui, the local warlord. Lu obtained an order of dispatch to Outer Mongolia for Onisaburo and his followers from Zhang Zuolin, the ruler of Manchuria at the time. Traveling on bad roads by car and by horseback, Onisaburo healed the sick and the injured as he went and became revered by the locals. Entreated by Lu to work a miracle, he reluctantly had his disciple cause a storm and then instantly stopped it. But as Onisaburo's party increased in influence, Zhang Zuolin became agitated and suspicious. In June he ordered his army to drive the party to Bayisingtu (present-day Tongliao City, Inner Mongolia) and executed Lu and his subordinates. Onisaburo and his five disciples – including his disciple Ueshiba – were in shackles and made to stand in front of the firing squad. Onisaburo composed a death poem, not only for himself but for all the others, but the execution was suspended at the last minute. In the end, Onisaburo's party was claimed by and handed over to the Japanese Consulate, and then deported to Japan.

Although the expedition ended abruptly it became the first step in Oomoto expanding its teachings overseas. And in 1925 Oomoto founded the organization Jinrui Aizen-Kai (Universal Human Association) to advocate the amity and harmony of all mankind.

== In popular culture ==
Two manga books about the Reikai Monogatari – Shin'en Bimyō (深遠微妙) (based on Part 2 of Volume 16), and Setsuzan Yuukoku (雪山幽谷) (based on Part 3 of Volume 16) – were published by Aizen Sekaisha (愛善世界社) in 2008.

== See also ==
- Oomoto Shin'yu
- Tama no Ishizue 1
- Tama no Ishizue 2
- Tama no Ishizue 3
- Tama no Ishizue 4
- Tama no Ishizue 5
- Tama no Ishizue 6
- Tama no Ishizue 7
- Tama no Ishizue 8
- Tama no Ishizue 9
- Tama no Ishizue 10
- Tama no Ishizue 11

== Sources ==
- (in Japanese)『「みろくの世」－出口王仁三郎の世界－』監修者：上田正昭、編者：出口王仁三郎言行録刊行委員会、発行者：出口文営、発行所：株式会社天声社、発行日：2008年2月19日 初版第7刷発行、ISBN 978-4-88756-068-0
- (in Japanese)『出口なお王仁三郎の予言・確言』著者：出口和明、編者：山口勝人、発行所：みいづ舎、発行日：2005年3月20日 復刻第一版発行、ISBN 4-900441-72-4 C0014
- (in Japanese)『大本七十年史 上巻』昭和三十九年二月四日発行、編集：大本七十年史編纂会、発行：宗教法人 大本
- (in Japanese)『大本七十年史 下巻』昭和四十二年八月七日発行、編集：大本七十年史編纂会、発行：宗教法人 大本
- (in Japanese)『大地の母』第1巻 青春の詩 著者：出口和明、発行所：株式会社あいぜん出版、発行日：1993年12月8日、ISBN 4-900441-01-5
- (in Japanese)『いり豆の花 大本開祖出口なおの生涯』著者：出口和明、発行所：八幡書店、発行日：平成七年七月三十日 初版発行、ISBN 4-89350-180-1 C0095
- (in Japanese)『出口なお 女性教祖と救済思想』著者：安丸良夫、発行所：株式会社岩波書店、発行日：2013年7月17日 初1刷発行、ISBN 978-4-00-600296-1
- (in Japanese)『出口王仁三郎 入蒙秘話』著者：出口和明、発行所：みいづ舎、発行日：平成17年8月16日 第2版発行、ISBN 4-900441-74-0 C0014
- (in Japanese)『予言と神話・出口王仁三郎と霊界物語の謎』編者：霊界物語研究会、著者：出口和明+出口三平+窪田英治+谷前清子、発行所：いづとみづ、発売元：八幡書店、発行日：1991年7月30日 初版第1刷発行、ISBN 4-89350-163-1 C0014
- (in Japanese)『大本襲撃－出口すみとその時代－』著者：早瀬圭一、発行所：株式会社新潮社、発行日：平成二十三年四月一日 発行、ISBN 978-4-10-139006-2 C0136
