= Omoto Station =

Omoto Station may refer to multiple railway stations in Japan:

- Iwaizumi-Omoto Station (formerly named Omoto Station) in Iwate Prefecture
- Ōmoto Station in Okayama Prefecture

== See also ==
- Omoto (disambiguation)
