= Sumi Deguchi =

Japanese religious leader

- Born: February 3, 1883; Ayabe, Kyoto, Japan
- Died: March 31, 1952 (aged 69)
- Resting place: Ayabe, Kyoto, Japan; 35°17′12″N 135°15′20″E
- Occupation: Religious leader
- Title: Second Spiritual Leader of Oomoto
- Predecessor: Nao Deguchi
- Successor: Naohi Deguchi
- Spouse: Onisaburo Deguchi

Sumi Deguchi (出口 すみ) (February 3, 1883 – March 31, 1952), also known as Sumiko Deguchi (出口 すみ子), was the Second Spiritual Leader of the Japanese new religious organization Oomoto. She was the daughter of Nao Deguchi, one of the two founders of Oomoto alongside Onisaburo Deguchi. She was also the mother of Naohi Deguchi, the Third Spiritual Leader.

== Biography ==
=== Early life ===
Sumi was born on February 3, 1883, in Ayabe, Kyoto. She was the 11th and the last child of Masagorō and Nao Deguchi.

Masagorō was a skillful carpenter with a good personality. However, being a heavy drinker and a spendthrift, he let go of the family's fields and properties one after another. Nao eked out a living by selling homemade sweet buns, which she learned to make during the service in her childhood. When Sumi was two years old, Masagorō was injured when he fell from the eaves of the house which he was building. Furthermore, his alcoholism caused paralysis. He became bedridden for about two years until his death in 1887.

Nao started scrap buying, which was the only profitable job that one could start with minimal cost. After Masagorō's death, while Nao worked outside, Sumi and her two-year-older sister Ryō stayed home. Despite living in poverty, Sumi grew up to be a cheerful, big-hearted, and mischievous child. When rain fell through a hole in the roof and formed a small pond in the ground, she placed small fish in it and enjoyed watching them swim. Acting like a tomboy, she got in the way of children going to school every morning. She often fought with older boys.

In Sumi's infancy, her brothers and sisters began to lead unusual lives. After Masagorō became bedridden, her eldest brother Takezō, a twenty-two-year-old apprentice carpenter, attempted suicide but failed. Sickly and spiritless by nature, he could not bear the pressure of having become, in place of his sick father, the head of the family obliged to support his family.

Her eldest sister Yone was a tender-hearted and beautiful girl who had worked hard since her childhood. In her late teens, she was forcibly married to a middle-aged yakuza named Shikazō Ōtsuki. Yone's character gradually deteriorated during her married life. For no apparent reason, she began to hate her mother Nao. In early 1892, at the age of thirty-six, Yone had a mental breakdown (in the Oomoto's doctrine, it is defined that she became divine-possessed). Most of the time, Yone was confined in ''zashikirō'', a latticed space built in the house. Yone died at the age of fifty-eight.

Her third sister Hisa started working at the age of five, peddling Nao's homemade sweet buns on her own. At the age of eleven, Hisa was sent to serve her relative for babysitting two babies and performing various farm chores. At the age of twenty-one, she married a rickshaw driver named Toranosuke Fukushima. Soon after her first daughter was born, Hisa went insane, (again, in the Oomoto's doctrine, it is defined that Hisa became divine-possessed.) Hisa's big sister (and Nao's second daughter) Koto brought a missionary of Konkōkyō from its Kameoka branch. Hearing the names of the gods to which the missionary prayed for Hisa's recovery, Hisa realized that those were the gods that she had seen in a delirious state. Hisa was then startled back to her senses. This occurrence made Hisa and Toranosuke devout followers of Konkōkyō.

Sumi's second brother Seikichi began peddling Nao's homemade sweet buns in place of Hisa at the age of eight. After Masagorō became bedridden, he became an apprentice to a paper maker. Sumi was fond of Seikichi, who was popular in the neighborhood for his looks and open-hearted personality. He was also a devoted son who followed whatever Nao told without complaint. In 1892, at the age of twenty, Seikichi was conscripted by the Imperial Guard of Japan. Before his enlisting and moving to Tokyo, Nao had him eat a sweet potato, which he liked. The last that they saw of him was when he was gladly eating the potato. In May 1895, the Imperial Guard was dispatched to Taiwan, which had been ceded to Japan as the result of the First Sino-Japanese War. Seikichi joined the dispatch, and it was reported, according to the record kept in Ayabe City Hall, that he was wounded in action (around that time, the Imperial Guard was quelling the local resistance) and died at a Taiwanese hospital in July. About thirty years later, during the 1920s, Onisaburo told Sumi about an encounter he had with a female chieftain of the Mongolian bandits, who claimed herself to be Seikichi's daughter. He also wrote about this encounter in the Special Edition of Reikai Monogatari.

=== Nao's divine possession ===
In early 1892, the nine-year-old Sumi witnessed Nao in a state of divine possession for the first time. Returning from the house of Yone who had gone insane, Nao, in a thunderous and dignified voice, commanded Sumi to wake up, go to Yone's house, and order them to offer thirty-six candles to the god and pray. Sumi was terrified but obeyed the command. When she came back, Nao had returned to her usual self, and she thanked Sumi in her gentle voice.

About this divine possession, Sumi heard from Nao that it began some days ago when she entered a dream-like state. She met a supremely noble God and felt the magnificent force emanating from him and entering her belly. The force rose like a ball towards her throat, pushing open her mouth against her will and emitting a magnificent and loud voice. Too worried, Nao asked the God questions in her usual voice, and the God answered them in his manly and grave voice through her throat. Through those sessions, the God possessing Nao named Himself as Ushitora no Konjin and declared that he is the God which would reconstruct the entire world. Sumi later stated that in the beginning Nao was utterly bewildered by the sudden possession of the God with such a grandiose intention. The discreet Nao was worried that if what the God told her was false, it would cause trouble for people. However, through day and night sessions with the God, Nao came to learn that she had to endure the hardships as the result of the cause arisen in the age of the gods, and the God made her endure them so that she could become a divine medium. Thus, she gradually formed a firm resolution to save the world.

In a state of divine possession, Nao often woke up Sumi (and left Ryō asleep) even on freezing nights and ordered her to sprinkle salt, water or soil in certain spots of the neighborhood. According to the God, it was to cleanse the land where he should dwell but had been completely desecrated. Despite occasional anxieties, Sumi obeyed such orders because of her optimistic personality and the joy that she felt when she heard her mother's gentle voice after the errands.

=== Childhood ===
In the early spring of 1892, because of their financial predicament, nine-year-old Sumi was sent to the house of her brother-in-law Toranosuke Fukushima and her big sister Hisa. Nao told her, "I know it is hard but this is an asceticism for you." At the Fukushima's, Sumi babysat, for a short period, their first daughter which died of illness before becoming two years old.

In the early summer of the same year, Sumi was sent to the house of another sister, Koto, who had married Shōzaburō Kuriyama. Sumi was severely abused by Koto, who was about twenty years older and had not lived together with her until then. Koto called Sumi a "burden" and gave various chores to her. Sumi babysat a fat three-year-old boy, carrying him on her back. She frequented a distant well to fetch water, several times a day and without wearing sandals. Koto chastised Sumi by beating her with a tobacco pipe and kicking her. The meals for Sumi were restricted and snacks were not given. One day, starving, Sumi dug out a potato from Shōzaburō's farm and ate it raw. One night Sumi thought about killing herself. However, she recalled Nao's word that this was something she must endure and refrained from suicide. Supposedly in the autumn of the same year, Sumi was taken again by Toranosuke Fukushima, who happened to see her and was shocked at how gauntly she had become.

In the autumn of the next year, 1893, Sumi was sent to serve at a wealthy and hard-working farmer's house in a village named Kisaichi. In the morning, she got up early to make and serve breakfast. In the daytime, she tended to cows, one of which was hard to tame. At night, she spun yarn and swept. In the spring of 1897, she finished her service in Kisaichi. She later regarded the hard labor there as the final asceticism of her girlhood.

=== Marriage with Onisaburo Deguchi ===
While Sumi was working in Kisaichi, Nao continued scrap buying and, when asked, prayed to God to heal the sick. By this, the number of people who believed in her gradually increased around Ayabe. In November 1894, with the support of the missionaries of Konkōkyō, the first propagation office for Nao was established. In April 1897, Nao had an office enshrining solely Ushitora no Konjin.

Sumi was told by Nao to be an apprentice of the divine works, but that she had nothing special to do. In July 1899, Onisaburo Deguchi (At that time, he used his birth name, Kisaburō Ueda) visited Nao for the second time. Meeting him for the first time, Sumi had a strange impression of his unusual appearance, especially Ohaguro (blackened teeth).

The automatic writings by Nao's hand declared that Sumi and Onisaburo would be Nao's successors. Nao, who was illiterate, started delivering the divine messages through automatic writing in 1893. Prior to that, as she had shouted the messages against her will, she was regarded as insane and was once confined in zashikirō inside her own small house. She and the Oomoto followers called these automatic-written messages ''Ofudesaki''.

Sumi was told by Nao that she would marry Onisaburo and that they would perform the divine works together. Neither liking nor disliking him, Sumi just felt that Onisaburo was a gentle and warm person. On January 1, 1900, the sixteen-year-old Sumi and twenty-eight-year-old Onisaburo were married.

In 1900 and 1901, Ofudesaki demanded the divine missions in Oshima (another name, Kanmurijima) and Meshima (another name, Kutsujima), in Mount Kurama, in Moto-Ise, and in Izumo-taisha. Together with Onisaburo, Nao and some selected followers, Sumi fulfilled all the missions.

On March 7, 1902, nineteen-year-old Sumi gave birth to her first daughter Naohi, who later succeeded Sumi and became the Third Spiritual Leader of Oomoto. And by the age of thirty-five, she gave birth to two sons, who died prematurely, and five more daughters.

=== Hardships as daughter, wife, and mother ===
Shortly after entering Ayabe, Onisaburo founded a new religious organization named Kinmei-kai, whose foundress was Nao and the chairman was himself. Soon it was renamed to Kinmei rei-gakkai.

Most of the executives of Kinmei rei-gakkai were the followers of Konkōkyō and intended to maintain its teaching and system. They confronted Onisaburo, who was assigned by Ofudesaki to bring the unique God of Oomoto, Ushitora no Konjin, into the world. The executives obstructed Onisaburo's activities. They took away the books which Onisaburo was reading, accusing him of studying foreign teachings. In his absence, they burned his manuscripts on teachings. Sumi later stated that various followers, such as an ambitious one who intended to take over Onisaburo's place, an arrogant one who disliked his special ability to see through things, and an ignorant one who did not understand his assignment, caused him great hardship. Onisaburo did not give up and wrote the manuscript at night, under the bed sheet and with a lamp light. While he was writing in the daytime, Sumi stood at the entrance and kept watch so that the executives would not see him.

Initially, Nao defended Onisaburo. However, Ofudesaki began to censure Onisaburo, and he conflicted with her. Sumi later explained that this conflict was caused by the difference between two systems of the spirits: one represented by Nao and the other by Onisaburo. The conflict escalated to the fierce battle of two Gods in the Japanese mythology: Amaterasu possessing Nao and Susanoo possessing Onisaburo. Sumi later stated that she endured unspeakable hardship as she was caught in a dilemma among the Foundress who was also her mother, the chairman who was also her husband, and the executives of Kinmei rei-gakkai.

In 1903, the conflict between Nao and Onisaburo gradually subsided. However, Nao and her avid followers adhered to Ofudesaki and strongly refused that Naohi would be vaccinated against smallpox. As yearly vaccination for a child was obliged by the law, every year Onisaburo and Sumi were caught in a dilemma between the town office and the local police enforcing the vaccination, Nao, the executives, and Naohi herself who refused the vaccination.

One day in those hard years, Onisaburo and Sumi, taking two-year-old Naohi, went to the mountain, gathered brushwood and ate a meager box lunch together. She later recollected that it was her happiest memory as a married couple.

=== Expansion of Oomoto ===
As the Home Ministry cracked down on religions not authorized by the government, the propagation of Kinmei Rei-gakkai was difficult. For the purpose of legalizing his religious activity, in September 1906 Onisaburo entered Kyoto Branch of Koten Kokyusho, which was a training institution for Shinto priests. After the graduation, he worked at Kenkun Shrine and then at the Osaka office of Ontake-kyō, which is one of the authorized sects of the Shinto religion.

While Onisaburo was away from Ayabe, Sumi struggled to make a living for her family: her two daughters, Nao, Nao's big brother, and Onisaburo's mother whose house was burned down. She sold some vegetables which she grew in a small land and ropes which she made of straw at midnight. Furthermore, she sold all their possessions except for some cooking tools and futons to sleep on. She made those efforts without letting those around her, including Nao and Onisaburo, notice such stringency.

In December 1908, Onisaburo returned to Ayabe. Under his direct leadership, the movement of Dainihon Shūsai-kai, which was renamed from Kinmei rei-gakkai in August of the same year, became quite active. In November 1909, their first shrine was built.

In May 1910, while Onisaburo was on a journey as a missionary, a detective came and forcibly took Sumi, who was breastfeeding her third daughter Yaeno, to the police station. Without being informed of what suspicion she was under, she was persistently questioned about the new followers. Instinctively sensing the danger, she gave bland answers and was released later that day. It was discovered later that, because of the High Treason Incident where socialists and anarchists were arrested on suspicion of planning to assassinate Emperor Meiji, the police had turned their suspicions on even a minor local organization like Dainihon Shūsai-kai.

In the summer of 1914, to comply with the orders by Ofudesaki, Onisaburo declared to dig a large pond in the site of Taihonkyō, which was renamed from Dainihon Shūsai-kai in July 1913. The concern was that there was no prospect of water coming out of the digging area, which was on a hill and full of stones underground. Mocked by the residents of Ayabe, Sumi told her concern to Onisaburo, and was replied that they just should dig as the God told. When he realized that the digging was not progressing as he had instructed before leaving for his missionary journey, he became so raged in a divine-possessed state and had Sumi and followers, including women and the aged, dig even at midnight in the falling sleet. Then, the municipal authorities of Ayabe requested Onisaburo to channel the reservoir water through Taihonkyō's site to the town below. This made the empty pond fill up with water. Sumi was impressed to see that the God's word was true: "Borrowing people's hands and mouths, He lets people turn the impossible into the possible."

=== Nao's later years ===
In 1916, Onisaburo renamed Taihonkyō to Kōdō Oomoto. While Onisaburo continued to expand Kōdō Oomotō nationwide through active propagation via its own press, Nao led quite a simple life and engaged herself in praying and automatic writing. Since her automatic writing ceased in May 1918, all day long she made objects of worship and amulets for the followers. On November 6, 1918, Nao fell unconscious and died at the age of eighty-one. Sumi composed a Japanese poem tanka, praising that Nao had prayed for the prosperity of the countries for twenty-seven years since the beginning of divine possession.

=== Becoming the Second Spiritual Leader ===
On November 25, 1919, the memorial service for the first anniversary of Nao's death was held and the position of the Leader was transferred from Onisaburo to Sumi, with Onisaburo attaining the position of Alternate Leader. This was in accordance with Ofudesaki in 1910, which had appointed Sumi as the Second and Naohi as the Third Leader.

During the period of change after World War I, Kōdō Oomoto achieved extraordinary growth. From 1917 to 1920, Oomoto Shin'yu was published. It consists of text messages where Onisaburo applied some kanji characters to all hiragana sentences of Nao's Ofudesaki for the purpose of making its true meanings easier to comprehend. The prophecies and warnings about the reconstruction of the world contained therein created a huge social sensation. It attracted not only military officers and intellectuals, but also rural peasants. It also resulted in backlash from religious, educational and media circles.

=== The First Oomoto Incident ===
On February 12, 1921, Onisaburo and the executives of Kōdō Oomoto, one of whom was Wasaburō Asano, were arrested on charges of lesè-majestè and violation of the Newspaper Law. During the search of the premises of Kōdō Oomoto, one police officer scoffed at the objects of worship, saying that it was just paper and stone. Enraged by this, some followers cursed the officer in whispers. Overhearing it, Sumi calmy admonished them that when an ignorant one acted profanely and disrespectfully to God, the way of Oomoto is to apologize to God for the sake of the one. She commented to the newspaper that she considered this incident to be God's arrangement and she was glad that the truth of Oomoto would be known to the public.

The Kyoto Police Department forced Onisaburo to write a document about the reform of Kōdō Oomoto and publicized it in June. As the document stated that the doctrine would be altered and Nao's Ofudesaki would be incinerated, the followers were astonished and the faction led by Hisa and Toranosuke Fukushima demanded Onisaburo and Sumi retire. Sumi replied that, although she did not know under what circumstances he had written it, as the Leader of Oomoto, she would never let Ofudesaki be incinerated. Shortly, as a letter from Onisaburo to Sumi revealed that the document was not written with his true intention, this issue was settled.

On October 5, the first trial convicted the defendants guilty on the charges and Onisaburo was sentenced to five years in prison for lesè-majestè. Sumi encouraged the followers, saying "If we are acquitted, the followers will become even more arrogant and end up ruining the divine teaching. There is no way to reconstruct the world without suffering." Six years later, in 1927, Onisaburo was acquitted due to an Act of Amnesty that accompanied the demise of Emperor Taishō.

=== Interaction with overseas organizations ===
In May 1922, Sumi commented in a newspaper interview that Oomoto (which was renamed from Kōdō Oomoto after the First Oomoto Incident.) did not exclude other religions and prayed for peace in every corner of the world. This volition was embodied through active interaction with various overseas religious and social organizations. In June, an American female missionary of the Iran-originated Baháʼí Faith met Sumi by chance on a train and visited Ayabe in September. This interaction with the Baháʼí Faith became the catalyst for Oomoto's full-fledged orientation towards cosmopolitanism. In 1923, Oomoto adopted Esperanto, which had been adopted by Baháʼí Faith, and launched their overseas mission with it.

In June 1925, Oomoto founded the organization Jinrui Aizen-kai, asserting that all human beings are originally siblings, and proclaiming that it would strive to establish an eternally luminous world beyond the barriers of race, nation and religion. In August 1926, the Pan-Asian Congress was held in Nagasaki, with the aim of promoting the unity among Asian peoples, and contributing to world peace. Among fifty-one participants from six nations, Sumi was the only female participant and contributed to achieve the aim by calming the atmosphere with her cheerful attitude when the discussion became heated.

In October 1929, Onisaburo and Sumi went on a missionary journey to Korea and Manchuria. Sumi was enthusiastically welcomed by the female members of a women's organization associated with a Chinese religious organization Daoyuan. This journey brought Oomoto into a closer affiliation with Daoyuan and its charitable association Red Swastika Society. And the two also went to Taiwan in January 1930.

=== The Second Oomoto Incident ===
In February 1933, Oomoto was renamed again to Kōdō Oomoto.

On December 8, 1935, while Onisaburo and Sumi were staying in the city of Matsue in Shimane Prefecture, a force of about 280 armed police officers besieged the place of their sojourn and arrested Onisaburo. The Home Ministry announced a policy to "eradicate Oomoto from the face of the earth" and arrested 987 followers and interrogated over 3,000 by the end of 1936.

For the purpose of the compulsory disposition of property of Kōdō Oomoto, the Ayabe Police Department coerced and then deceived Sumi into submitting a power of attorney and arrested her in March 1936. She was the only woman arrested in this incident. Detained at Gojō Police Station, she was told by the police officer that her family would never be spared the death penalty. In July, she was indicted. Before being transferred to a prison in Nakagyō-ku, she asked for a cup of water. The police officer gave it to her, saying that this was "matsugo-no-mizu", the water given to a dying person. At that moment, she thought that she was about to be executed. Strangely, she livened up and made up her mind to face the execution cheerfully, thinking that the God was waiting for her in heaven and that it would be better than being locked up for long, even though she had done nothing wrong. In a prison cell, tormented by the summer heat and mosquito attacks, she consoled herself by gazing at a paulownia tree in the garden and a cicada chirping there, talking to a flock of sparrows visiting at a small window and a couple of cockroaches coming in, and by feeding them with grains of rice. She also composed tanka poems expressing her concerns for her family and imprisoned followers, her honest feelings about the anguish of the prison life, and her grieves for the followers deceased due to the torture during interrogation.

In August 1938, the first trial began at the Kyoto District Court. As all the police officers, who had interrogated the followers, denied the torture and duress in their testimonies, Sumi was into a state of divine possession and rebuked one of them. In February 1940, the first trial convicted all fifity-five defendants guilty. For the violation of the Peace Preservation Law and lesè- majestè, Onisaburo was sentenced to life imprisonment. For the violation of Peace Preservation Law, Sumi was sentenced to ten years in prison. Uchimaru Deguchi, who was their son-in-law and the top executive of Kōdō Oomoto, was sentenced to fifteen years in prison.

The defense council filed an appeal and submitted the bail applications for Onisaburo, Sumi, and Uchimaru. The bail was denied and the three were transfeered to a prison in Kita-ku, Osaka. Sumi was put into a cell shared with four to five female prisoners. As she gave half of her meals to them, they took good care of her. Her naivete, which was not impaired by a long term imprisonment, impressed the judicial officials, too. The chief judge Tsunao Takano told to her lawyers that he was surprised at and was impressed with her answers as innocent as a child during the trial. When the Chief of the Criminal Affairs Bureau of the Ministry of Justice watched her through a small observation window of her cell, she spoke to him in a carefree manner, inviting him to come inside for a chat as if the cell were her home. Later the Chief told to his colleagues that he had met a great woman. When appearing in court, to groom herself in a feminine manner, Sumi applied makeup by painting her face white with powdered toothpaste, instead of white powder which she did not have. She was consoled by the letters and drawings which her daughters and grandchildren sent her almost daily. She returned letters written in Hiragana, expressing her love for them, concern for Onisaburo and her sons-in-law Uchimaru and Michimaru Deguchi (who married Sumi's fifth daughter Hisae. He was sentenced to five years in prison, however, was released on bail due to hemoptysis.), and gratitude to God.

In July 1942, the second trial convicted all the defendants only in the violation of Peace Preservation Law, including Sumi and Uchimaru, not guilty. Onisaburo was convicted guilty of lesè-majestè was sentenced to five years in prison. In August, the seventy-year-old Onisaburo, fifty-nine-year-old Sumi and thirty-nine-year-old Uchimaru were released on bail and thus ended six years and four months of Sumi's detention. In September, Onisaburo and Sumi visited Nao's grave. Before and after the First Oomoto Incident, the grave was forced by the authorities to be altered twice. Upon the Second Oomoto Incident, the grave was destroyed and the coffin was moved to the communal cemetery. The grave marker was erected upon the soil where her belly should have been, according to the instruction from the Section Chief of The Special Higher Police who claimed that Nao was such a great sinner that her soul would not rest in peace unless her head was trampled on by the people.

In September 1945, the Supreme Court confirmed the judgment of the second trial, however, in October, the conviction of lesè-majestè was dissolved due to an Act of Amnesty that accompanied the end of Greater East Asia War. In October and November, the lands in Kameoka and in Ayabe, which were formerly owned by Kōdō Oomoto, were unconditionally returned to Kōdō Oomoto. On December 8, 1945, ten years from the occurrence of the Second Oomoto Incident, a ceremony was held to announce to the God the settlement of the Incident. Sumi cheerfully welcomed 1,500 attendees. After the ceremony, she conducted a memorial service for the deceased in relation to the incident.

=== Onisaburo's later years ===
In February 1946, Oomoto was restarted as Aizen-en and Onisaburo became its Leader. (In October 1949, it was renamed to Oomoto Aizen-en and in April 1952 back to Oomoto.)

In 1946, Onisaburo and Sumi went on a missionary journey to San'in Region and to Kii Province, which was the last journey for Onisaburo.

In August, Onisaburo suffered a cerebral hemorrhage and became bedridden. On January 19, 1948, Onisaburo died at the age of seventy-six. Sumi bowed with her hands on the floor beside his deathbed, expressing the gratitude for his long years of hard work, pledging to do well as his successor, and praying for his peaceful rest. Then she thanked her family, his aides and executives for their hard works over the years. She told them that it was joyous that Onisaburo finally ascended to heaven after setting the stage for the arrival of "Miroku-no-yo", which is the term written in Ofudesaki and means Heaven on Earth in the Oomoto's doctrine. At the wake, she encouraged the tearful and stunned followers, telling them that even though he was gone, she was here for them. She even sang a merry folk song and danced, laughing and saying that people would call her mad, seeing her dancing when her husband had died. At the memorial service for the first anniversary of Onisaburo's death, Sumi composed tanka poems expressing her grief at the loss, the belief that his spirit was in heaven, and the apology for having thought light of his great soul.

=== Later years ===
Upon Onisaburo's death, Sumi became the Second Leader of Aizen-en and Naohi became the Alternate Leader.

In February 1948, Aizen-en founded Aizen Mizuho-kai, an organization with the aim of restoring rural communities and achieving food self-sufficiency. Sumi promoted its activity and told the followers that they should cherish the soil, be grateful for what it produced, and strive to increase food production.

Sumi strongly agreed with the World Federalist Movement and instructed the executives to research and to cooperate with it. In December 1949, Jinrui Aizen-kai was restarted and Sumi became the Second President. (The First President was Onisaburo.) Hearing that the world congress for World Federal Government was to be held in Rome in April 1951, she decided to attend it. She told people about her decision while visiting door-to-door and selling a copy of the journal of Jinrui Aizen-kai. Her journey to Rome, however, did not take place due to earnest pleas of the executives who concerned about her health. Jinrui Aizen-kai made the concerted effort to promote the idea of World Federation and in 1950, Ayabe became the first city in Japan to declare itself a World Federation City, and Kameoka became the second.

From May 1948 to December 1951, Sumi went on missionary journeys throughout Japan, despite the difficult transportation conditions.

Around the end of 1951, Sumi's health deteriorated due to angina pectoris. On March 31, 1952, she died at the age of 69. Naohi composed tanka poems in mourning for her mother, who had a short life without a moment of peace of mind, and was gone while the petals of the cherry blossoms were falling outside. In April, Sumi's formal funeral was held. Delivered were flowers and more than 1,000 messages of condolence, including those from the mayor of the municipalities such as Kyoto, Ayabe, Kameoka, and Kanazawa, corporations and organizations such as Gunze (at that time, Gunze Silk Manufacturing Co., Ltd. A silk mill which was later developed to be a clothing brand in Ayabe.), Red Swastika Society, and Sekai Renpō Kensetsu Dōmei (later-to-be World Federalist Movement of Japan.), religious organizations or their leaders or executives such as International Religious Fellowship, Japanese Association of Religious Organizations, Higashi Hongan-ji, Konkōkyō, World Church of Messiah (founded by the Oomoto former executive Mokichi Okada.), Kurozumikyō, Tenrikyo, PL Kyodan, Kiyomizu-dera, Daigo-ji and Kurama Kōkyō, politicians such as Hitoshi Ashida (the 47th Prime Minister born in Fukuchiyama.), Shigesaburō Maeo (later-to-be the 58th Speaker of the House of Representatives born in Kyoto Prefecture.), Komakichi Matsuoka (the 39th Speaker of the House of Representatives and the 1st President of the Japanese Diet Committee for World Federalist Movement.), and Yoshie Ōishi (one of the first group of women elected to the House of Representatives born in Kyoto Prefecture.), the President of the Christian universities such as Hachirō Yuasa of International Christian University and Setsuji Ōtsuka of Doshisha University, Itsurō Hayashi (the defense attorney of the Second Oomoto Incident and The International Military Tribunal for the Far East.), and artists such as Yasunari Kawabata (later-to-be awarded the Nobel Prize for Literature.), Sen Sōshitsu XIV (the 14th Grand Master of Urasenke.) and Iwao Kongō (the 25th Head Master of the Kongō School of Noh).

== Evaluation of calligraphic works ==
At the followers' requests, Sumi produced numerous calligraphic works, without learning the art of calligraphy. They were all written in Hiragana and look as if they were made by a child. However, a philosopher and an art critic Tetsuzō Tanikawa praised her works as first-class works in the history of Japanese calligraphy. An artist Kitaōji Rosanjin saw her work at the house of a potter Kaneshige Toyo, who was an Oomoto follower. He was amazed at the naivety, scale, and freedom of the work. After her death, he wrote a memorial article, recollecting his pleasant encounter with her.

== Sources ==
- (in Japanese)『京都府百年の年表 6 宗教編』"Kyotofu Hyakunen no Nenpyō 6 Shūkyō-hen" Edited by Kyoto Prefectural Library and Archives, Published by Kyoto Prefecture on March 31, 1970.
- (in Japanese)『宗教の昭和史』"Shūkyō no Shōwa-shi" Written by Shigeyoshi Murakami, Published by Sanrei Shobō on November 30, 1985. ISBN 978-4-914906-35-1 (in Japanese)『いり豆の花 大本開祖出口なおの生涯』"Irimame no Hana: Oomoto Kaiso Deguchi Nao no Shōgai" Written by Yasuaki Deguchi, Published by Hachiman Shoten on July 30, 1995. ISBN 4-89350-181-1 C0095
- (in Japanese)『大本襲撃－出口すみとその時代－』"Oomoto Shūgeki: Deguchi Sumi to Sono Jidai" Written by Keiichi Hayase, Published by Shinchosha on April 1, 2011. ISBN 978-4-10-139006-2 C0136
- (in Japanese)『大本七十年史 上巻』"Oomoto Nanajūnen-shi: Jōkan" Edited by Oomoto Nanajūnen-shi Hensan-kai, Published by Oomoto, a religion corporation on February 4, 1964.
- (in Japanese)『おさながたり』"Osanagatari" Written by Sumiko Deguchi, Published by Tenseisha on August 3, 2020. ISBN 978-4-88756-000-0
- (in Japanese)『出口王仁三郎 入蒙秘話』"Deguchi Onisaburo Nyūmō Hiwa" Written by Yasuaki Deguchi, Published by Miidusha on August 16, 2005. ISBN 978-4-900441-74-3 C0014
- (in Japanese)『近代民衆宗教史の研究 増訂版』"Kindai Minshū Shūkyō-shi no Kenkyū Zōtei-ban" Written by Shigeyoshi Murakami, Published by Hōzōkan on November 10, 1963.
- (in Japanese)『出口なお 女性教祖と救済思想』"Deguchi Nao: Josei Kyōso to Kyūsai Shisō" Written by Yoshio Yasumaru, Published by Iwanami Shoten on July 17, 2013. ISBN 978-4-00-600296-1
- (in Japanese)『評伝 出口王仁三郎』"Hyōden Deguchi Onisaburo" Written by Shigeyoshi Murakami, Published by Sanseido on August 15, 1978.
- (in Japanese)『大本七十年史 下巻』"Oomoto Nanajūnen-shi: Gekan" Edited by Oomoto Nanajūnen-shi Hensan-kai, Published by Oomoto, a religion corporation on August 7, 1967.
- (in Japanese)『ぼっかぶりのうた』"Bokkaburi no Uta" Written by Sumiko Deguchi, Published by Tenseisha on September 23, 2022. ISBN 4-88756-054-0
- (in Japanese)『逐条恩赦法釈義 改訂再増補版』"Chikujō Onshahō Shakugi Kaitei Sai Zōho-ban" Written by Inosaburō Okada, Published by Dai-ichi Hoki Shuppan on February 15, 1959.
- (in Japanese)『根源美の探求』"Kongenbi no Tankyū" Written by Torao Deguchi, Published by Tankosha on October 19, 1969.
- (in Japanese)『金重陶陽－人と作品』"Kaneshige Toyo: Hito to Sakuhin" Edited by Sanyo Shimbun, Published by Kajima Institute Publishing on October 10, 1968.
- (in Japanese)『魯山人著作集 第二巻』"Rosanjin Chosakushū Dai 2 Kan" Written by Kitaōji Rosanjin, Published by Gogatsu Shobō on November 30, 1980.
