= Omoto =

Omoto (sometimes Oomoto or Ohmoto) may refer to:

- Oomoto, a Japanese religion
  - Oomoto Shin'yu, a sacred scripture of Oomoto.
- Omoto, the Japanese name for the ornamental plant Rohdea japonica
- Omoto, New Zealand, a small settlement inland from Greymouth in the South Island
  - Omoto locomotive dump at Omoto, New Zealand

== Family name ==
- Ayano Ōmoto, a Japanese singer and dancer.
- Makiko Ohmoto, a Japanese voice actress.
- Hideki Omoto, a Japanese rower.
- Patilah Omoto, a Kenyan international footballer.
- Sakurako Omoto, a Japanese field hockey player.
- Yoji Omoto, a Japanese water polo coach.
- Kei Omoto, a Japanese football player.
- Yuki Omoto, a Japanese football player.

== See also ==
- Omoto Station
