= Oomoto Shin'yu =

Oomoto religious text dictated by Nao Deguchi

- 大本神諭

Information
- Religion: Oomoto
- Author: Nao Deguchi; Onisaburo Deguchi (editor)
- Language: Japanese
- Period: 1892–1918 (Meiji era and Taishō era)
- Chapters: 277

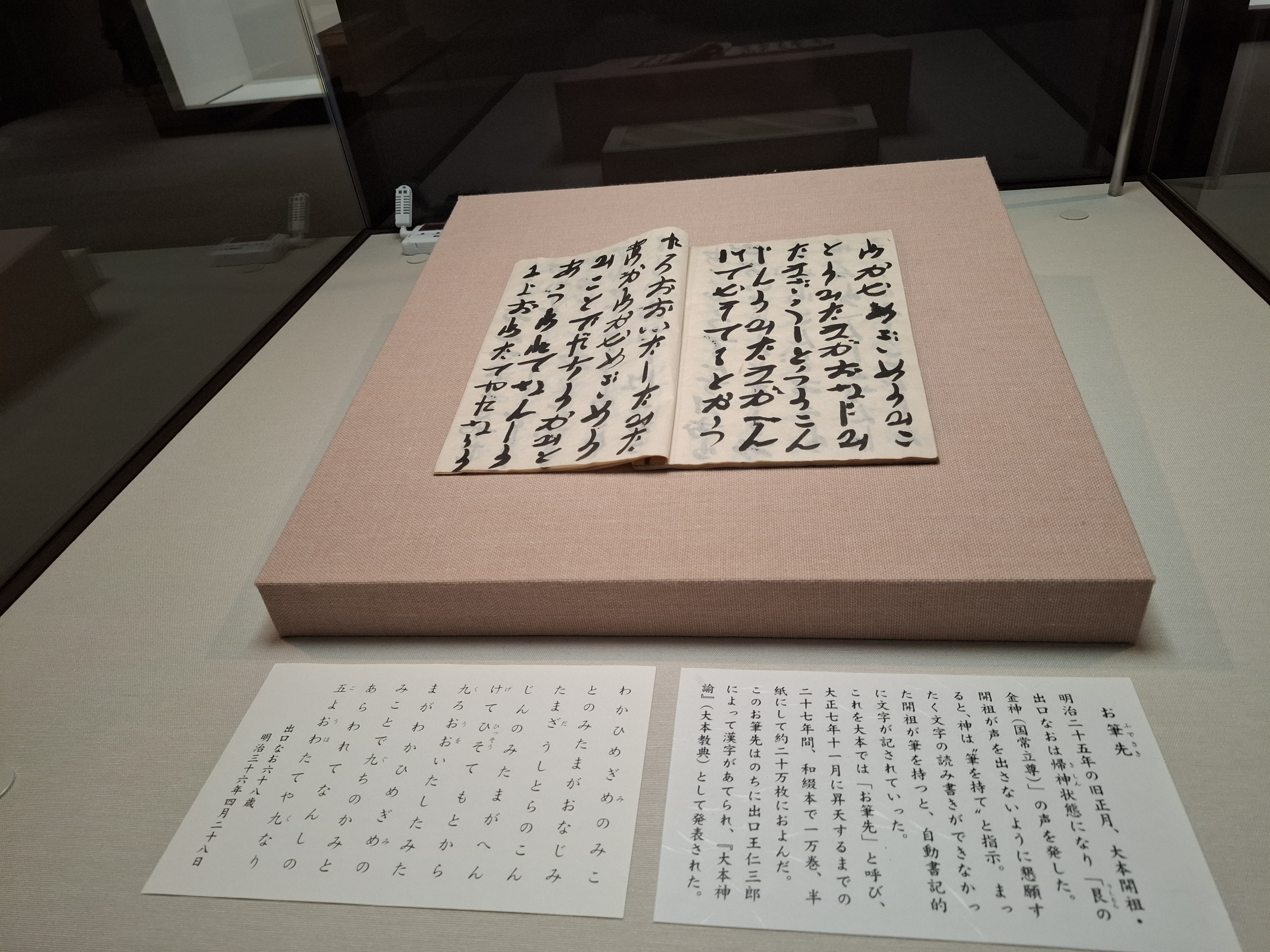
Handwritten manuscript of Nao Deguchi's Ofudesaki displayed at Oomoto's headquarters in Kameoka, Kyoto

The Oomoto Shin'yu (大本神諭) is a sacred scripture of Oomoto, a Japanese new religion founded in 1892 by Nao Deguchi. Beginning in 1892, it was originally dictated by Nao Deguchi and written on paper in hiragana. The manuscript, originally known as the Ofudesaki or Fudesaki (not to be confused with the Ofudesaki of Tenrikyo by Miki Nakayama), was later reinterpreted and edited by Onisaburo Deguchi to become the Oomoto Shin'yu. Onisaburo Deguchi glossed the original kana text with kanji and prepared it for publication. During the course of editing the manuscript, Onisaburo Deguchi altered some of the meanings of the original text, since he and Nao Deguchi had differing beliefs. As a result, the Nao Deguchi's original unedited, unpublished manuscript is referred to as the Ofudesaki, while Onisaburo Deguchi's edited version is known Oomoto Shin'yu.

The text has 277 sections, organized by date starting from 1892 up until Nao Deguchi's death in 1918. The best-known, most widely quoted section is the first one from January 1892. As a millenarian text, much of the Oomoto Shin'yu states that Ayabe would become the new spiritual center of the world, and that the world is about to experience a complete renewal.

== Origins ==
The original manuscript was called Ofudesaki or Ofudegaki by Nao (not to be confused with the Ofudesaki of Tenrikyo). Encompassing roughly 200,000 pages of Japanese paper, it is written entirely in uneven hiragana which even Oomoto followers regard as unskilled. It is claimed that Deguchi was illiterate, and that the text is an emanation of a powerful kami named Ushitora no Konjin. The first writing includes a warning that Tokyo would become a wilderness, and Ayabe would become the capital. When Nao began to produce this document, people thought she was insane. However, in 1892, she predicted the First Sino-Japanese War two years before it happened. When the war broke out, people began to take her more seriously.

A key theme of the text is the "demolition and reconstruction" (立替へ立直し, tatekae tatenaoshi) of the world, or literally the "three thousand worlds" (三千世界, sanzen sekai).

== Publication history ==
The modern publication of the Ofudesaki by the Oomoto organization is called Oomoto Shin'yu. There are a number of issues with this publication. Since the original contained prophecies of war with America and attacks on the Emperor, the text was temporarily banned in 1920 and heavily censored when it was finally published, and no version survives without the censor's black marks. It is suspected that a military official had a hand in its editing, against Nao's specific request. Oddly, one of the original verses read, "Not a single word of this writing is inaccurate," which seems to preclude editing.

There are numerous editions of the Oomoto Shin'yu. A 5-volume edition was published in 1968, and a 7-volume edition was published by Tenseisha (天声社), Oomoto's publishing house, in 1983. The most recent edition was published by Aizen Sekaisha (愛善世界社), the official publishing house of the Oomoto Foundation, in 5 volumes from 2010–2012.

== Translations ==
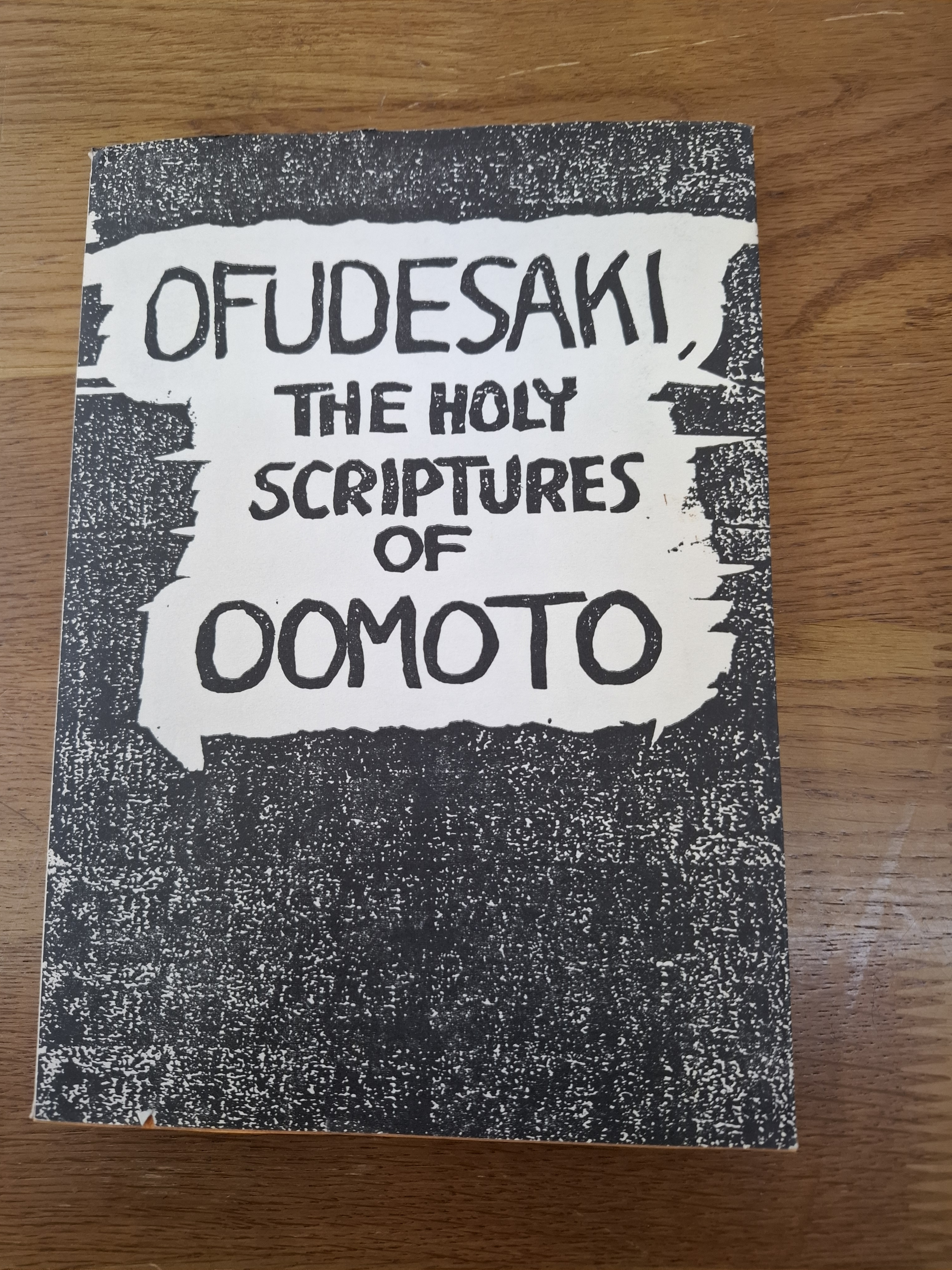
Ofudesaki: The Holy Scriptures of Oomoto, an English translation of the text

Only partial translations of the Oomoto Shin'yu exist in English, Esperanto, Portuguese, and other languages, all of which omit anti-foreign passages in Nao Deguchi's original version.

An English translation of the Oomoto Shin'yu was published in 2008. It was originally written in 1974 as an Oomoto internal document with the cooperation of British Oomoto researchers Mrs. Worcester and Mrs. Cox, and American researcher Richard Steiner.

There is also a 1999 abridged Esperanto translation by Shigeki Maeda, titled Diaj Revelacioj, with a total of 837 numbered paragraphs.

Revelações Divinas, an abridged 2000 Portuguese version directly translated by Benedicto Silva from the Diaj Revelacioj in Esperanto, is published by Oomoto do Brasil, the Brazilian branch of Oomoto.

== List of sections ==
Below is a list of the 277 sections in the Oomoto Shin'yu, which are titled according to the date that the text was divinely revealed.

Japanese year	Gregorian year	Day
Meiji 25	1892	January (day unknown); May 5
(year unknown)	(1890s)	(month unknown)
Meiji 26	1893	(month unknown); July 12
Meiji 27	1894	January 3
Meiji 29	1896	May 26; August 23; December 2
Meiji 30	1897	(month unknown); November 6
Meiji 31	1898	January 3; March 24; leap (閏): March 6; leap (閏): March 27; April 4; April 16; May 5; July 16; August 7; August 27; September 30; November 5; November 30; December 26
Meiji 32	1899	(month unknown); January (day unknown); January 18; February (day unknown); February 3; March (day unknown); April (day unknown); April 12; April 22; June (day unknown); June 3; June 9; June 10; June 18; June 20; June 23; July (day unknown); July 1; July 3; July 9; July 29; August (day unknown); September 19; December 17; December 29
Meiji 33	1900	January 7; January 15; March 1; April 7; May 20; June 10; July 30; August 4; August 5; August 6; August 8; August 10; August 11; August 13; August 16; August 20; leap (閏): August 1; leap (閏): August 2; leap (閏): August 4; leap (閏): August 5; leap (閏): August 23; September 6; September 12; December 11; December 13
Meiji 34	1901	January 16; February 24; March 7; June 3; July 15; August 5; August 6; September 1; September 16; September 17; September 18; November (day unknown); November 9; December 3
Meiji 35	1902	March (day unknown); March 8; March 11; March 12; March 14; April 3; June 1; June 3; June 8; June 10; June 14; June 16; June 20; July 1; July 11; July 12; July 16; July 25
Meiji 36	1903	January 1; January 3; January 5; January 9; January 30; February 9; February 29; March 5; April 1; May 1; May 6; May 8; May 11; May 18; May 19; leap (閏): May 23; June (day unknown); June 4; June 5; June 7; June 8; June 12; June 14; June 15; June 17; July 13; July 24; August 16; August 22; August 27; August 30; September 18; October 1; October 10; November 4; November 9; November 14; November 19; December 7; December 10; December 25; December 28; December 29
Meiji 37	1904	January 10; January 11; January 16; February 11; July 5; July 12; August 3; August 10
Meiji 38	1905	April 16
Meiji 39	1906	December 2
Meiji 40	1907	July 11; August 26; October 16
Meiji 41	1908	April 24; June 8; June 13; June 15; August 14; October 10; October 15; October 18
Meiji 42	1909	October 6; October 29
Meiji 43	1910	April 15; April 18; August 7; September 10; September 28
Taishō 1	1912	March 8; July 4; July 30; August 19; October 5
Taishō 2	1913	September 11
Taishō 3	1924	May 24; July 11; July 14; September 17; September 19
Taishō 4	1915	January 23; April 6; April 9; April 14; May 4; May 13; June 8; June 11; June 12; June 13; June 15; June 20; June 22; June 28; July 12; July 15; August 28; August 30; November 6; November 26; December 2
Taishō 5	1916	February 3; February 8; March 6; March 14; March 17; March 23; March 28; May 14; May 18; May 21; June 10; July 23; August 5; September 5; September 9; October 2; November 8; November 21; December 3
Taishō 6	1917	January 22; January 23; February 9; leap (閏): February 22; leap (閏): February 25; March 9; March 12; April 17; April 26; May 6; August 22; September 5; September 30; October 16; November 23
Taishō 7	1918	January 12; January 13; January 23; February 26; March 15; October 29

== See also ==
- Reikai Monogatari
