= Nao Deguchi =

Japanese founder of the Oomoto religion

- 出口 なお
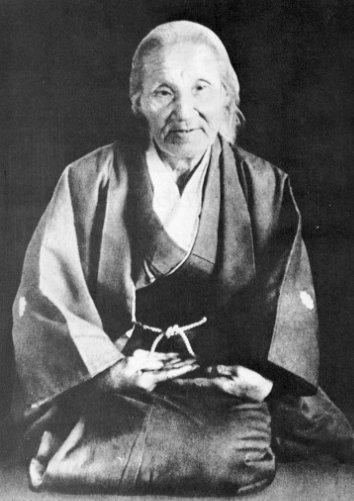
- Deguchi in 1916

Personal life
- Born: January 22, 1837 Fukuchiyama
- Died: November 6, 1918 (aged 81) Ayabe
- Resting place: Ayabe; 35°17′12″N 135°15′20″E
- Children: Sumi Deguchi

Religious life
- Religion: Oomoto

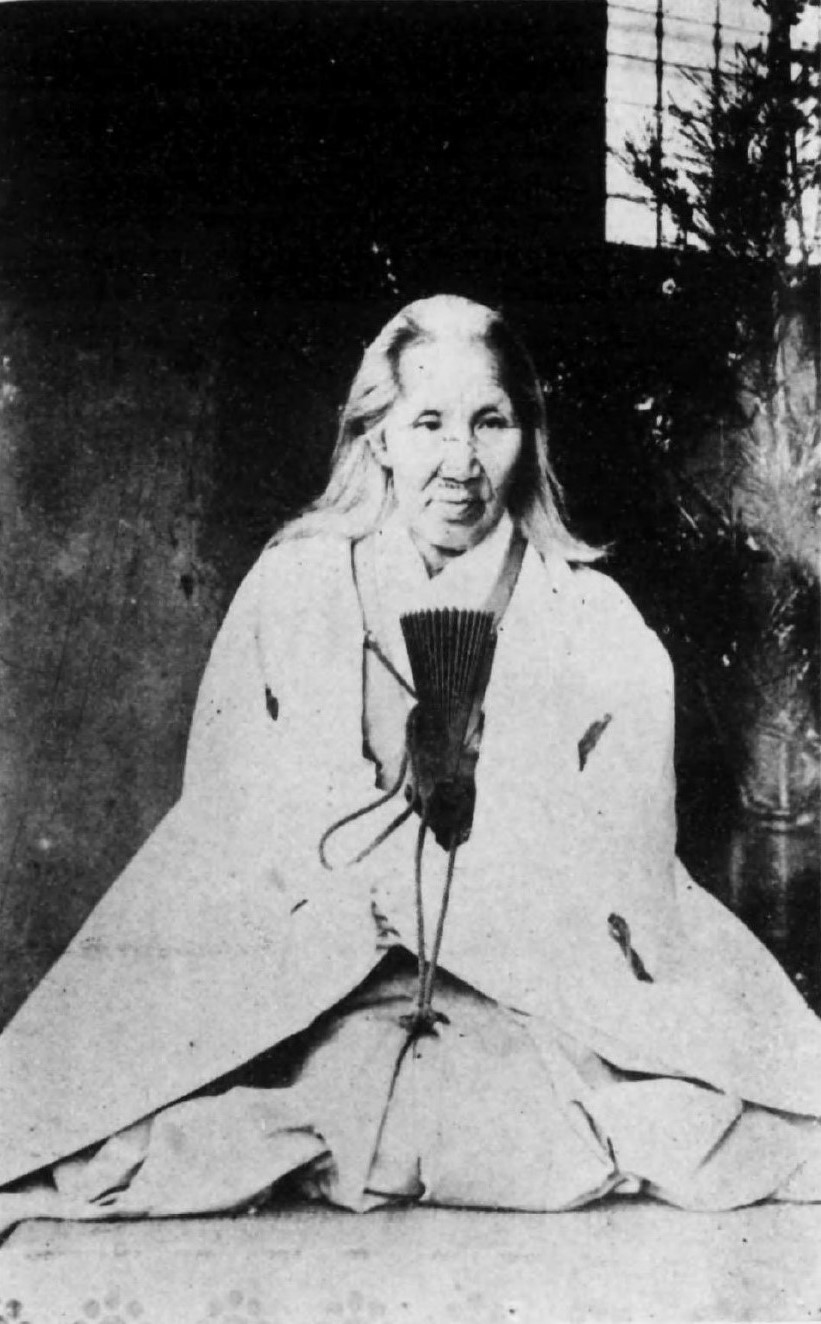
A portrait of Nao Deguchi

Nao Deguchi (出口 なお) (January 22, 1837 – November 16, 1918) was a Japanese religious leader who founded the Oomoto religion together with Onisaburo Deguchi. The origins of Oomoto began when she was possessed by a spirit called Ushitora no Konjin in 1892. Even though she was illiterate, she wrote 200,000 pages of prophesies while possessed.

While Nao Deguchi is the Foundress (開祖, Kaiso) of Oomoto, Onisaburo Deguchi is the Holy Teacher (聖師, Seishi).

== Biography ==
Deguchi was born in Fukuchiyama, Tanba Province (present day Kyoto Prefecture) on January 22, 1837. She was the third child and the first daughter. She was born in the middle of a famine, so her parents considered abandoning her, but chose not to after Deguchi's grandmother scolded them. Her father, Gorosaburo Kirimura, died of cholera when she was 9, leaving Deguchi to work to support the family.

When she was 16 she was adopted into the Deguchi family. The Deguchis had no children, and adopted her so that she could marry their adopted son, a carpenter named Masagoro Deguchi, and continue the family name. They had 8 children, but because of Masagoro's alcoholism and financial mismanagement, the family lived in poverty. After falling off a house and breaking his pelvis, Masagoro died on March 1, 1887.

In 1892, Deguchi was possessed by a spirit called Ushitora no Konjin, who prophesied that the world would soon end and that a savior would come and create heaven on earth. She was arrested in the suspected arson attack because of her prophecies. After she had been freed because a true criminal had been found, she was caged to prevent violence. When she begged Ushitora no konjin to stop making her yell in the cage, he started to make her write scripts with an old nail there. This was the beginning of the writing. Though she was illiterate, whenever the spirit would speak to her, she would write down the prophesies through automatic writing. She wrote over 200,000 pages of prophesies. She called these writings the Ofudesaki (御筆先). She initially acted as a branch of Konkōkyō, then broke off and founded her own religion.

Deguchi met Onisaburo Deguchi in 1899, and he married her daughter, Sumiko, in 1900. He organized her writings into Oomoto-kyo's scripture, and codified the religion. Together, they started the Dai Nihon Shūseikai. In 1913 its named changed to the Taihonkyō, and in 1916 the name changed again to the Kōdō Ōmoto. Despite their work together, they sometimes had different interpretations of the writings that Deguchi had created. Deguchi died on November 6, 1918.

Nao Deguchi died in 1918. She was buried in a mound at Okutsuki (奥都城) cemetery in Ayabe. Onisaburo Deguchi and Nao Deguchi are buried in adjacent mounds, with Nao in the front right mound and Onisaburo in the front left mound.

== Selected bibliography ==
- Deguchi, Nao (1979). Ōmoto shin'yu. Heibonsha.

== See also ==
- Nakayama Miki, foundress of Tenrikyo
