= Oomoto =

Religion founded in 1892 in Japan

- 大本 (おおもと/おほもと)
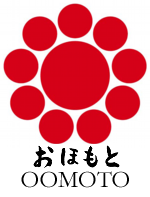
- Type: Universal spiritual organization
- Classification: Sectarian Shinto sect
- Scripture: Oomoto Shin'yu (大本神諭); Reikai Monogatari (霊界物語); Michi no Shiori (道の栞); Michi no Hikari (道の光)
- Spiritual leader: Kurenai Deguchi (出口 紅)
- Language: Japanese; Esperanto; English; Portuguese
- Headquarters: Kameoka, Kyoto (administrative); Ayabe, Kyoto (spiritual)
- Founder: Nao Deguchi and Onisaburo Deguchi
- Origin: 1892; Ayabe, Kyoto
- Separated from: Konkokyo
- Separations: Seicho-No-Ie; Church of World Messianity; Ananaikyo; Shintō Tenkōkyo
- Other name: Ōmoto-kyō
- Official website: www.oomoto.or.jp
- Slogan: Unu Dio, Unu Mondo, Unu Interlingvo (Note: Originally in Esperanto rather than Japanese. In English and Japanese: One God, One World, One Language (一つの神、一つの世界、一つの言葉, Hitotsu no Kami, Hitotsu no Sekai, Hitotsu no Kotoba).)

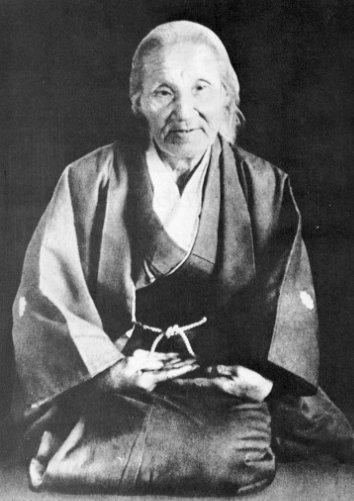
Nao Deguchi, the foundress of Oomoto

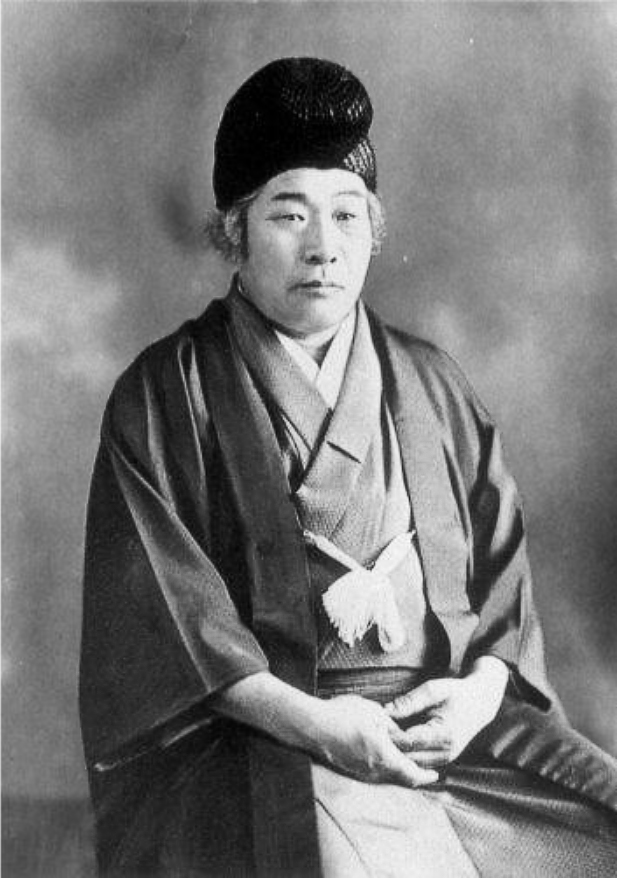
Deguchi Onisaburo, the co-founder of Oomoto

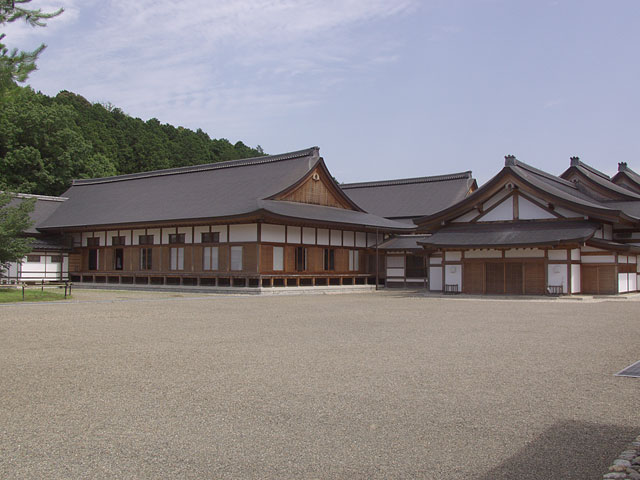
Chōseiden (長生殿) in Ayabe

Oomoto (大本, Ōmoto; lit. "Great Source" or "Great Origin"), also known as Oomoto-kyo (大本教, Ōmoto-kyō), is a religion founded in the 1890s by Deguchi Nao (1836–1918) and Deguchi Onisaburō (1871–1948). Oomoto is typically categorized as a Shinto-based Japanese new religion. The spiritual leaders of the movement have always been women within the Deguchi family, along with Onisaburō as its founding seishi (spiritual teacher). Since 2001, the movement has been guided by its fifth leader, Kurenai Deguchi.

Oomoto's administrative headquarters is in Kameoka, Kyoto (Onisaburo Deguchi's hometown), and its spiritual headquarters is in Ayabe, Kyoto (Nao Deguchi's hometown). Uniquely among Japanese religions, Oomoto makes extensive use of the constructed language Esperanto to promote itself as a world religion. Oomoto has historically engaged in extensive interfaith dialogue with religions such as the Baháʼí Faith, Christianity, and Islam, since a key tenet of Oomoto is that all religions come from the same source (in Japanese: bankyō dōkon (万教同根)).

After World War II, Oomoto was fully legalized as a registered religious organization. Various other religions have also been founded by former followers of Oomoto, most notably Seicho-No-Ie and the Church of World Messianity.

== History ==
In 1892, Deguchi Nao, a housewife from the town of Ayabe, Kyoto Prefecture, declared that she had a "spirit dream" during the Japanese New Year. She became possessed (kamigakari) by Ushitora no Konjin (艮の金神) and started to transmit the kami's words. According to the official Oomoto biography of Deguchi, she came from a family which had long been in poverty, and had pawned nearly all of her possessions to feed her children and invalid husband. After 1895, and with a growing number of followers, Deguchi Nao briefly affiliated herself with the Konkōkyō religion until 1897, since she did not yet have government approval for her religious movement.

In 1898, Deguchi Nao met Ueda Kisaburō, who had previous studies in kamigakari (spirit possession). In 1899, they established the Kinmeikai together, which became the Kinmei Reigakkai later in the same year. In 1900, Kisaburō married Nao's fifth daughter Sumiko and adopted the name Deguchi Onisaburō. Oomoto was thus established based on Nao's automatic writings (Ofudesaki) and Onisaburō's spiritual techniques.

Since 1908, the group has taken diverse names — Dai Nihon Shūseikai (大日本修齋會), Taihonkyō (1913), and Kōdō Ōmoto (皇道大本) (1916). Later, the movement changed from Kōdō Ōmoto ("great origin of the imperial way") to just Ōmoto (大本, "great origin") and formed the Shōwa Seinenkai in 1929 and the Shōwa Shinseikai (昭和神聖会) in 1934.

Asano Wasaburō, a teacher at Naval War College (海軍大学校, Kaigun Daigakkō), attracted various intellectuals and high-ranking military officials to the movement in 1916. By 1920, the group had their own newspaper, the Taishō nichinichi shinbun (大正日日新聞), and started to expand overseas. Much of its popularity derived from a method of inducing spirit possession called chinkon kishin (鎮魂帰神), which was most widely practiced from 1916 to 1921. Following a police crackdown, Onisaburō banned chinkon kishin in 1923. Today, in present-day Oomoto, only the chinkon (鎮魂) aspect is practiced as a form of meditation, but not the kishin (帰神) aspect of spirit possession.

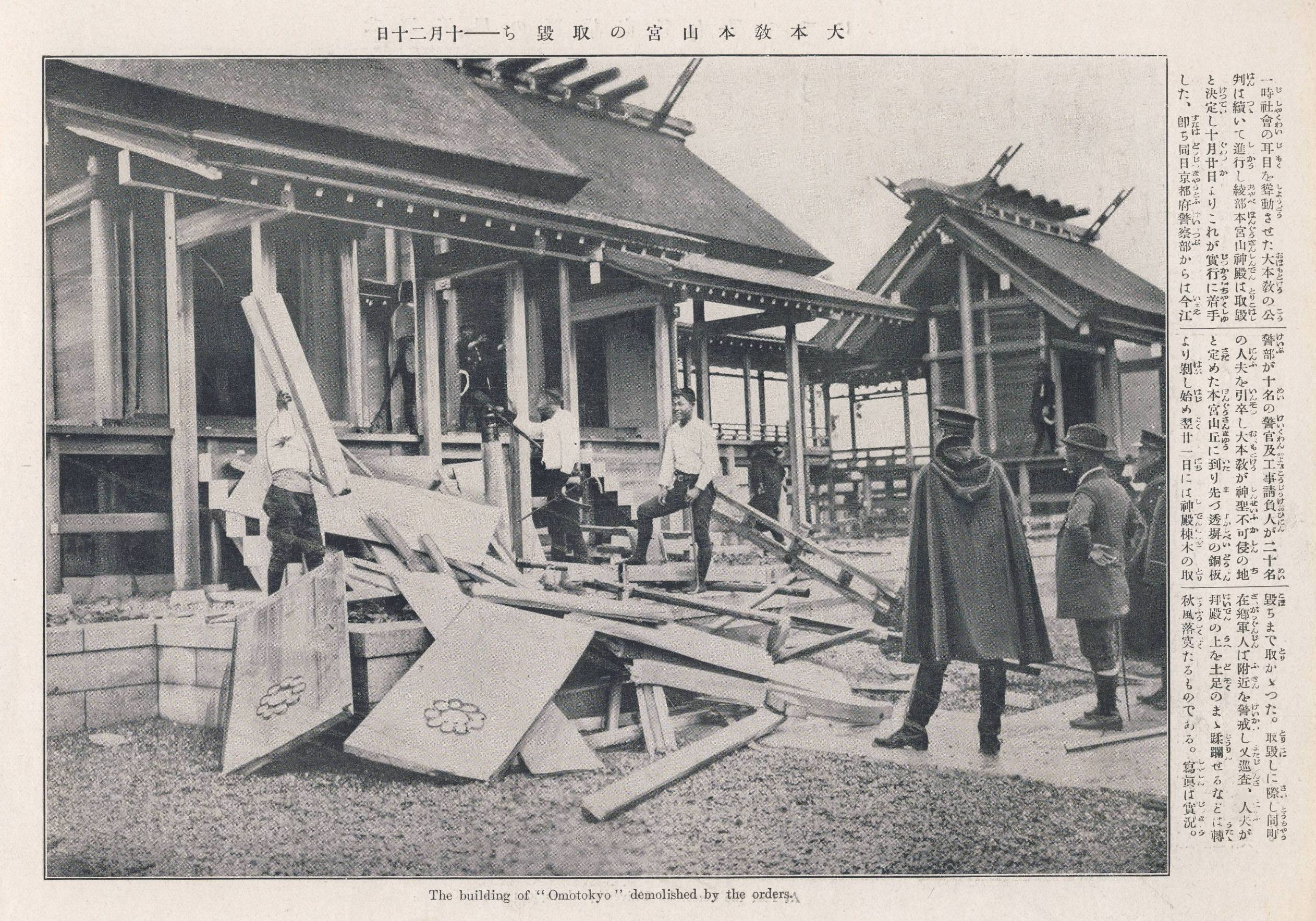
News article covering the First Oomoto Incident in 1921

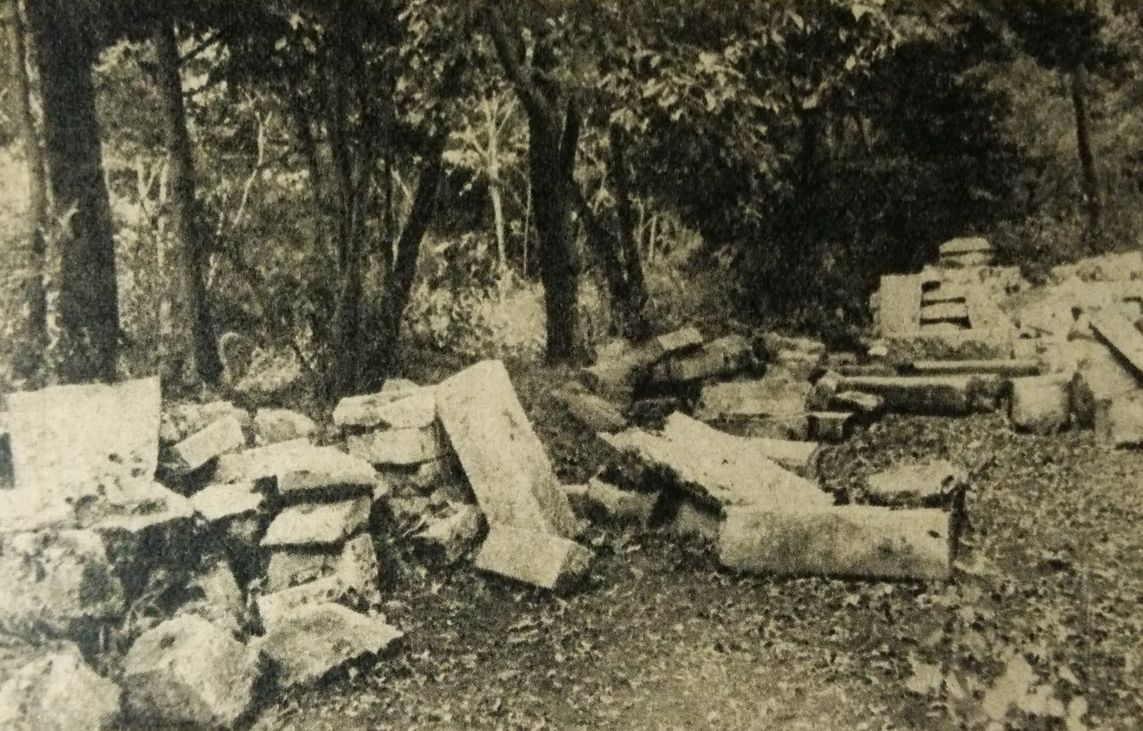
Photograph of site remains during the Second Oomoto Incident in 1935, published in the Asahi Graph

Alarmed by the popularity of Oomoto, the Imperial Japanese government, which promoted kokutai, State Shinto, and reverence for the emperor, condemned the sect for worshipping Ookunitokotachi above Amaterasu, the sun goddess from whom the Emperor of Japan claimed descent. This led to two major incidents when Oomoto was persecuted under the lèse-majesté law, the Newspaper Censorship Law, and the Public Security Preservation Law of 1925. In 1921, the first Oomoto Incident (大本事件, Ōmoto jiken) resulted in the Oomoto headquarters being destroyed, and Onisaburo and a few of his followers were imprisoned.

From 1925 until 1933, Oomoto maintained a mission in Paris. From there, missionaries travelled throughout Europe, spreading the word that Onisaburo Deguchi was a Messiah or Maitreya who would unify the world.

=== Connections with nationalism ===
Then in 1920 Oomoto bought a daily newspaper company and publicized a prophecy and warning of war, calamity, and social reform. As a result, Onisaburo and two executives of Oomoto were arrested and charged with lèse-majesté and violation of the Newspaper Law, and were jailed in February 1921. After being detained for 126 days, Onisaburo was released from prison in June 1921 and returned to Oomoto's headquarter in Ayabe. These events are called the First Oomoto Incident.

In March 1920, the Ōmoto-affiliated magazine Shinrei published an edition of The Protocols of the Elders of Zion in Japanese for the first time.

In 1924, retired naval captain Yutaro Yano and his associates within the Black Dragon Society invited Onisaburo to embark on a journey to Mongolia, to plant a utopian colony on the Mongolian steppe. Onisaburo led a group of Oomoto disciples, including Aikido founder Morihei Ueshiba. They were captured by the forces of Chinese warlord Zhang Zuolin, but were released upon realizing they were Japanese nationals. After returning to Japan, Onisaburo established the secular organization Jinrui Aizenkai (人類愛善会), also known as Universal Love and Brotherhood (ULBA), to promote universal brotherhood and world peace. Religious organizations from around the world, including the Baháʼí Faith, Cao Dai, Red Swastika Society, and Universal White Brotherhood, joined this movement.

In 1935, the Second Oomoto Incident again left its headquarters in ruins and its leaders in prison. This incident was carried out far more intensively than the previous one in 1921, as the Japanese government sought to completely eradicate all traces of Oomoto shrines and materials. Oomoto was effectively outlawed until the end of World War II. With the Second Oomoto Incident, Oomoto became the first religious organization to be prosecuted under the Public Security Preservation Law of 1925.

=== After 1945 ===
After World War II, Oomoto reappeared as Aizen-en (愛善苑), a movement dedicated to achieve world peace which was led by Onisaburo Deguchi's eldest grandson Yasuaki Deguchi (出口和明). It was registered in 1946 under the Religious Corporations Ordinance. Yasuaki Deguchi considered Onisaburo rather than Nao to be the main founder of the religion, and thus used Onisaburo's Reikai Monogatari as its main scripture.

In 1949, Oomoto joined the World Federalist Movement and the World Peace campaign. In 1952, the group returned to its older name, becoming the religious corporation Oomoto under the Religious Corporations Law. Since then, Oomoto has opened various international branches, including Oomoto do Brasil (headquartered in Jandira, São Paulo, Brazil).

== Spiritual leadership ==
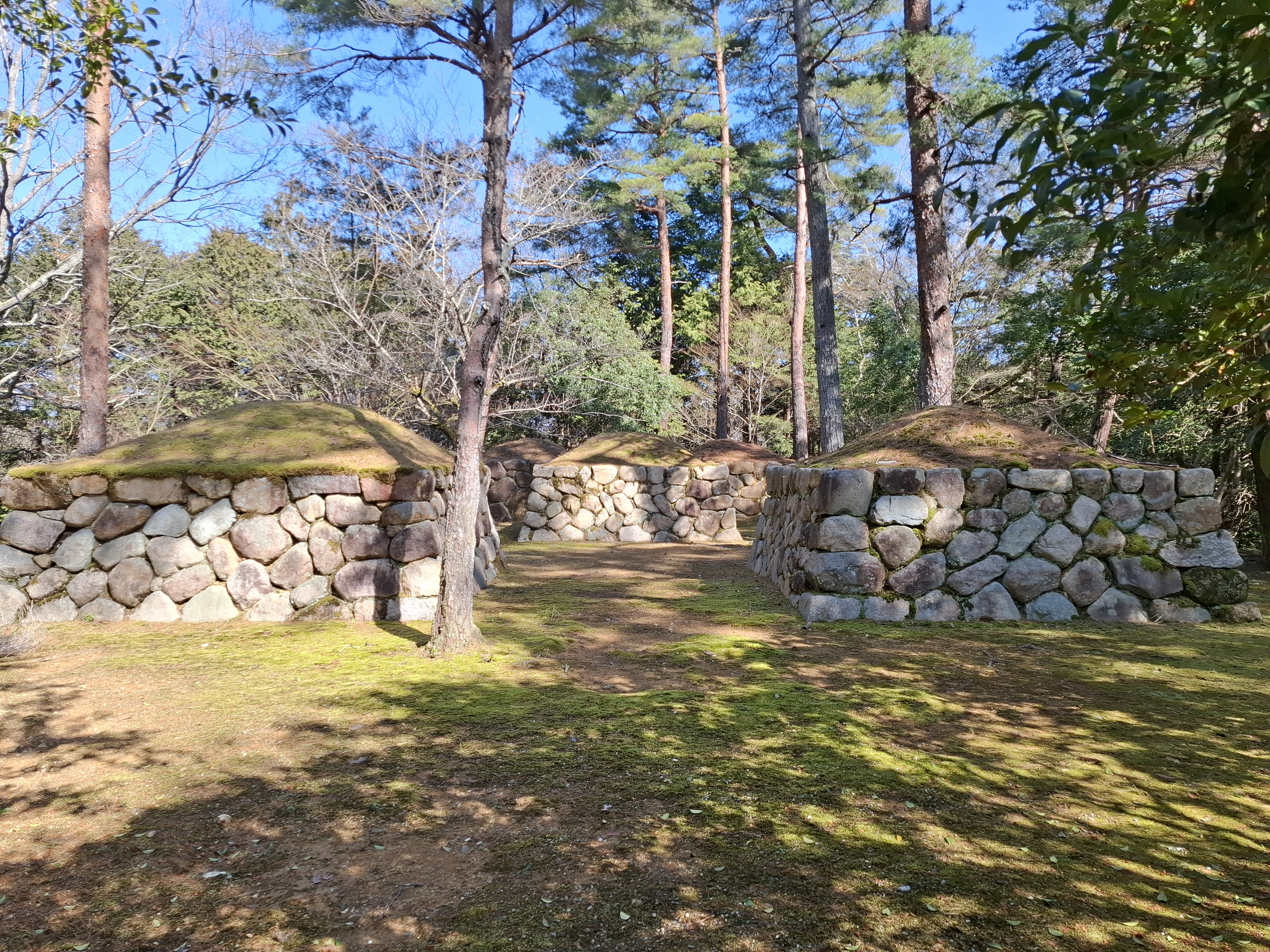
Tenno-daira Cemetery (天王平) in Ayabe where Onisaburo Deguchi, Nao Deguchi, and all of Oomoto's successive spiritual leaders are buried: Left mound in the front: Onisaburo Deguchi's grave Right mound in the front: Nao Deguchi's grave Center mound in the back: Sumi Deguchi's grave

Oomoto's spiritual leaders, all of whom belong to the Deguchi (出口) family, are:

- Main Founder (active 1892–1918): Nao Deguchi (出口なお; 1837–1918); also referred to as the Foundress (開祖, Kaiso)
- Co-Founder (active 1898–1948): Onisaburo Deguchi (出口王仁三郎; 1871–1948); also referred to as the Holy Teacher (聖師, Seishi)
- Second Spiritual Leader: Sumi Deguchi (出口すみ子; 1883–1952), Onisaburo's wife
- Third Spiritual Leader: Naohi Deguchi (出口直日; 1902–1990), Onisaburo's eldest daughter
  - Alternate Spiritual Leader: Hidemaru Deguchi (出口日出麿) (1897–1991), husband of Naohi Deguchi; also referred to as the Revered Teacher (尊師, Sonshi)
- Fourth Spiritual Leader: Kiyoko Deguchi (出口聖子; 1935–2001), Naohi's third daughter
- Fifth Spiritual Leader: Kurenai Deguchi (出口紅; 1956–present), Kiyoko's niece, who has served as Fifth Spiritual Leader of Oomoto since 29 April 2001

Oomoto's spiritual headquarters, called Baishō-en (梅松苑), is in Ayabe, Kyoto, due to its association with Nao Deguchi's founding of the religion in Ayabe. Baisho-en is known for the shintaizan Mount Hongū, as well as a garden centered around an artificial lake called Kinryūkai (金竜海) (lit. 'Golden Dragon Sea'). However, its administrative headquarters, called Ten'on-kyō (天恩郷), is in Kameoka, Kyoto. Oomoto also has a mission center, called Tōkō-en (東光苑), in Taitō, Tokyo.

== Scriptures ==
The two main scriptures (basic kyōten 根本教典) used in Oomoto are:

- Oomoto Shin'yu (大本神諭, 277 sections), composed during 1892–1918 (originally dictated by Nao Deguchi as the Ofudesaki; reinterpreted and edited by Onisaburo Deguchi to become the Oomoto Shin'yu)
- Reikai Monogatari (霊界物語, 81 sections), composed during 1921–1934 (dictated by Onisaburo Deguchi)

Of the two, the Reikai Monogatari is by far the most commonly consulted and used scripture in present-day Oomoto.

Next in importance are two scriptures (kyōten 教典) composed by Onisaburo Deguchi during the first decade of the 20th century, namely Michi no Shiori (道の栞) (lit. 'Guide to the Way') and Michi no Hikari (道の光) (lit. 'Light on the Way').

There are also various other less commonly used texts, such as Izunome Shin'yu (伊都能売神諭, 37 volumes, composed during 1918–1919), and the Three Mirrors or San Kagami (三鏡, 844 chapters total) by Onisaburo Deguchi, which consists of the Water Mirror (水鏡, 249 chapters), Moon Mirror (月鏡, 212 chapters), and Jade Mirror (玉鏡, 383 chapters).

== Sacred sites ==
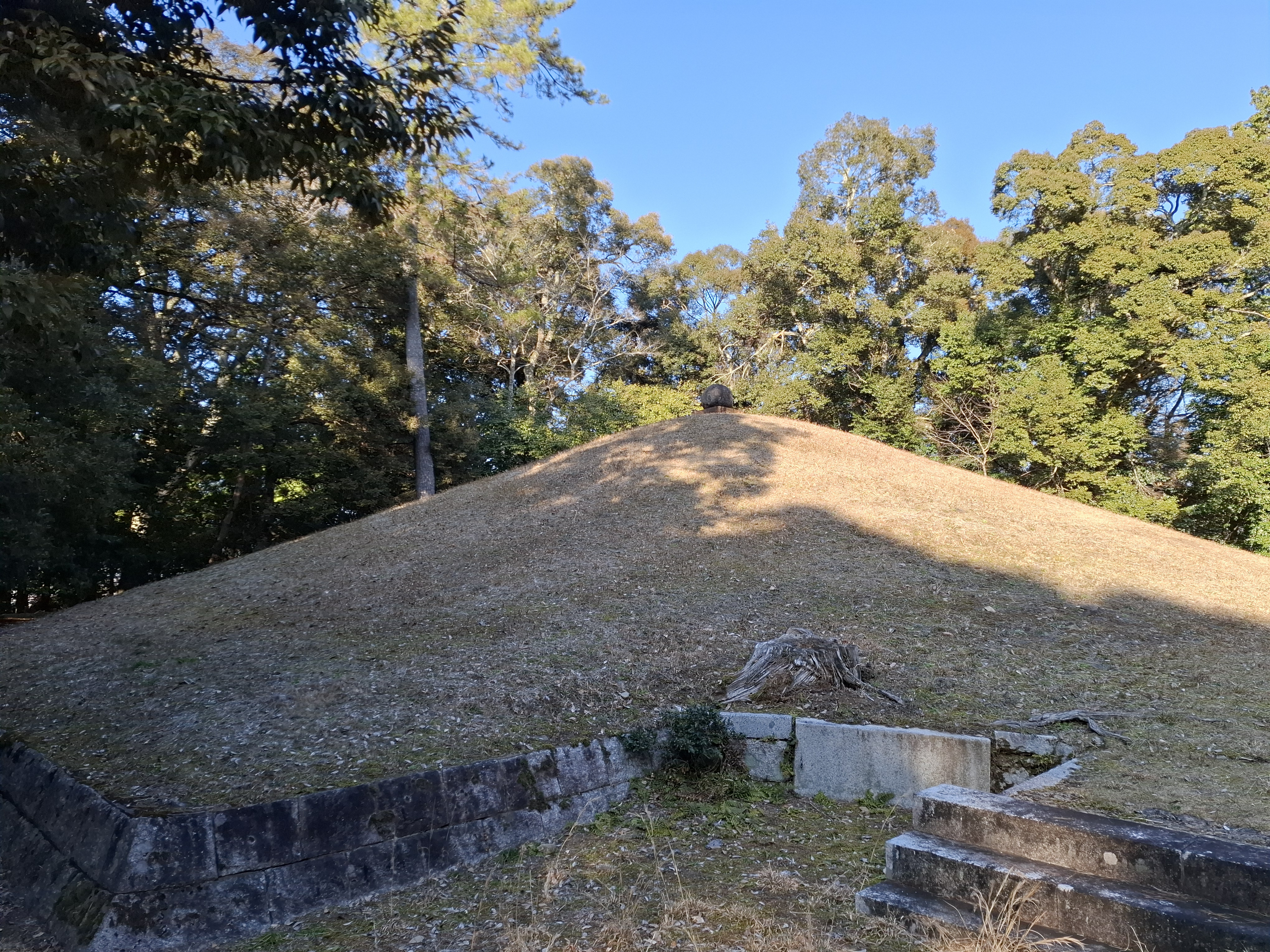
The summit of Mount Hongū in Ayabe

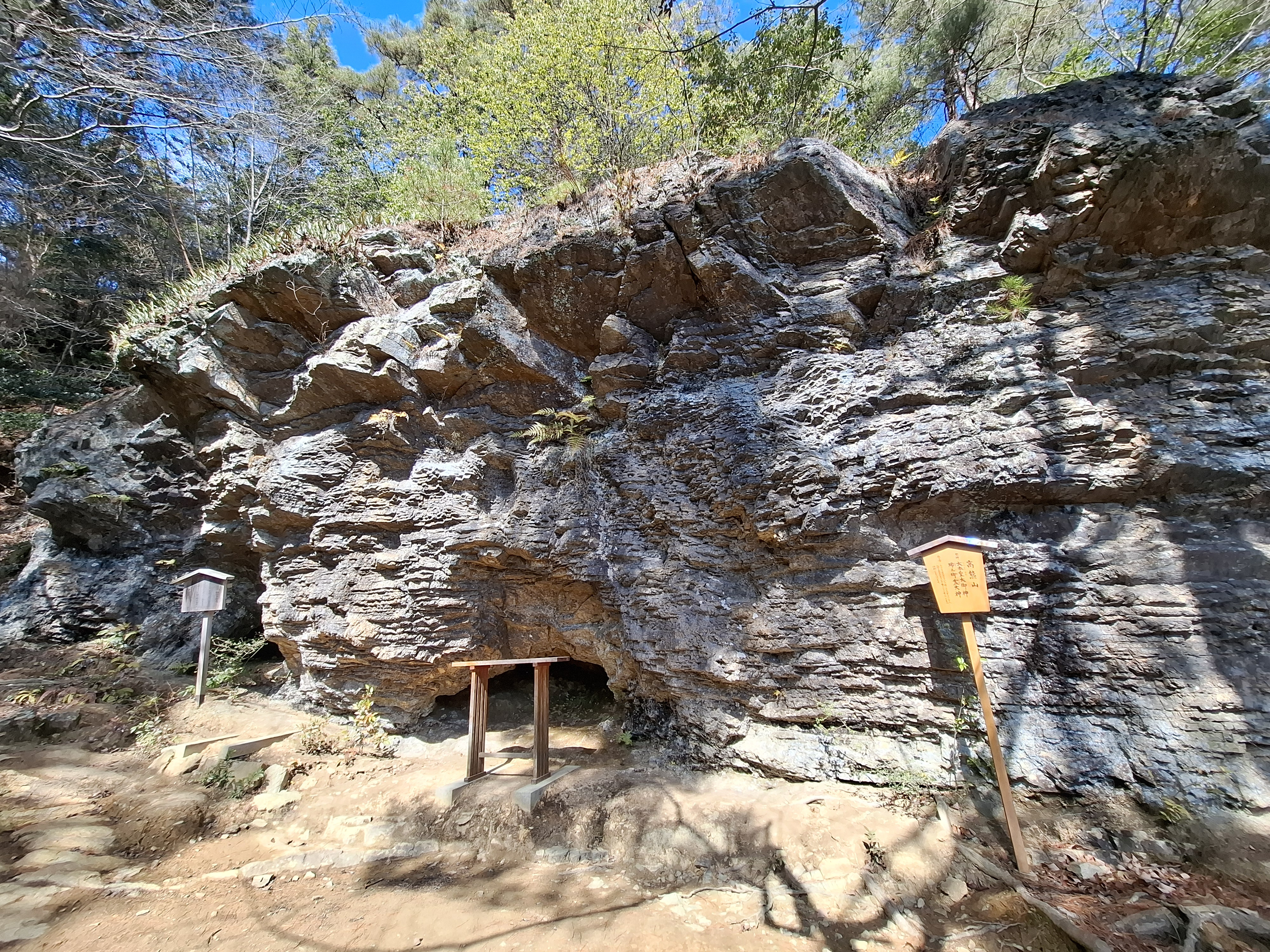
The Cave of Onisaburo Deguchi on Mount Takakuma

Oomoto has numerous sacred sites, some of which are:

- Kutsujima (沓島; pronounced Meshima in Oomoto) and Kanmurijima (冠島; proounced Oshima in Oomoto) are the two islands considered sacred to Ushitora no Konjin (艮の金神).
- Kamishima (神島; also known outside of the Oomoto religion as Ueshima 上島) off the coast of Takasago, Hyogo
- Takakuma-yama (高熊山) (354.9 metres) in Anao (穴太), Kameoka, Kyoto; Onisaburo Deguchi performed spiritual training for one week in a cave on the mountain during March 1–7, 1898.
- Mount Hongū (本宮山) (92 metres) (also known as Tsuruyama 鶴山 or Maruyama 丸山) in Ayabe, located on the grounds of Baishō-en (梅松苑)
- Misen-zan (弥仙山) (664 metres) in Ayabe, where Nao Deguchi secluded herself in 1901
- Hachibuse-yama (鉢伏山) (1,221 metres) in Kami, Mikata District, Hyōgo, climbed by Onisaburo Deguchi just after World War II
- Ashiwake-yama (芦別山) (1,727 metres) in the Yūbari Mountains in Hokkaido, where the kami Kuni-no-Tokotachi-no-Mikoto (国常立尊) resides.
- Miyabaru-yama (宮原山), a mountain on Kikaijima (or Kikaigashima) in Kagoshima Prefecture, where the kami Toyokumonu-no-Mikoto (豊雲野尊) resides.
- The Kumayama ruins on Kumayama (熊山) (508 metres), a mountain in eastern Okayama

== Festivals ==
Four major festivals (大祭, taisai) are held for each of the four seasons.

- Setsubun Grand Festival (節分大祭, Setsubun taisai), February 3, Ayabe
- Spring Grand Festival (みろく大祭, Miroku taisai), May 5, Ayabe
- Summer Grand Festival (瑞生大祭, Zuisei taisai), August 7 (traditionally the 12th day of 7th lunar month), Kameoka
- Autumn Grand Festival (開祖大祭, Kaiso taisai), or the Foundress' Festival, November 6, Ayabe

== Art ==
Oomoto and its adherents promote Japanese arts and culture, such as Noh theater, calligraphy, ceramics, and the tea ceremony. According to Onisaburo Deguchi, "Art is the mother of religion" (芸術は宗教の母, geijutsu wa shūkyō no haha). This perspective was also shared by Oomoto follower Mokichi Okada, who founded both the Church of World Messianity and the MOA Museum of Art in Atami.

== Use of Esperanto ==
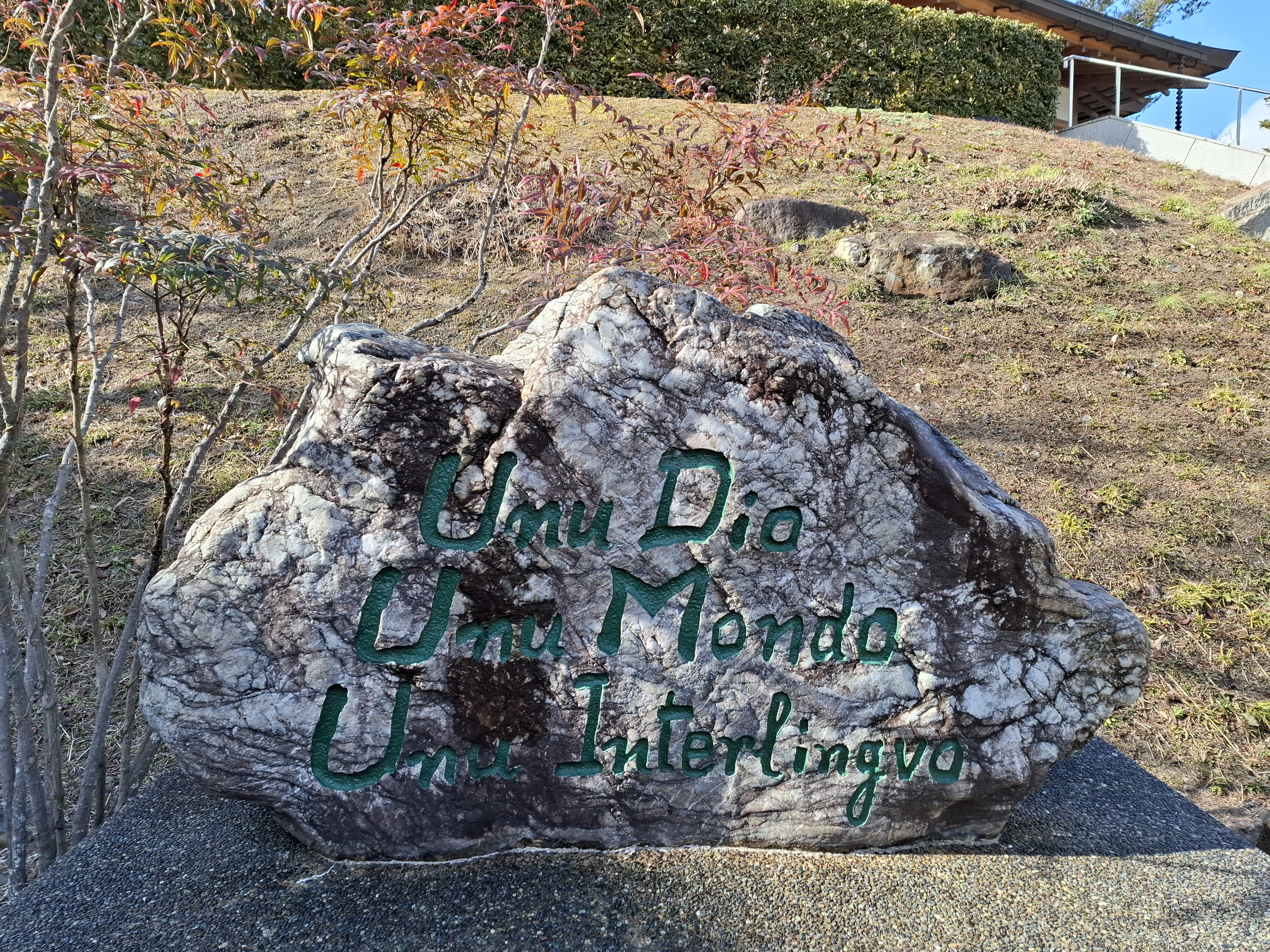
An inscribed stone in Kameoka with the official motto of Oomoto in Esperanto: Unu Dio, Unu Mondo, Unu Interlingvo ("One God, One World, One Language")

The constructed language Esperanto plays a major role in the Oomoto religion. Starting from the early 1920s, the religion has published a large amount of literature in Esperanto. Onisaburo Deguchi reportedly introduced Esperanto back when he had interfaith dialogues with the Baháʼí Faith in 1921. Many Oomoto facilities in Kameoka, Kyoto have multilingual signs in Japanese and Esperanto. Today, Oomoto continues to publish numerous books, periodicals, pamphlets, and websites in Esperanto; some materials (translation of Japanese texts, etc.) are actually more extensive in Esperanto than in English.

The creator of Esperanto, L. L. Zamenhof, is revered in Oomoto as a kami. The Oomoto affirmation of Zamenhof's enshrinement as a kami is stated, in Esperanto, as follows:

...[L]a spirito de Zamenhof eĉ nun daŭre agadas kiel misiisto de la anĝela regno; do, lia spirito estis apoteozita en la kapeleto Senrej-ŝa.

The text above as translated into English is:

...[T]he spirit of Zamenhof even now continues to act as a missionary of the angelic kingdom; therefore, his spirit was deified in the Senrei-sha shrine.

== Doctrine ==
The Oomoto basic doctrine (大本教旨, Ōmoto kyōshi), also known as the shinjin itchi (神人一致), states that:

God is the Spirit which pervades the entire universe,
and man is the focus of the workings of heaven and earth.
When God and man become one,
infinite power will become manifest.

The original Japanese text of the Ōmoto kyōshi is:

神は万物普遍の霊にして (kami wa banbutsu fuhen no rei ni shite)
人は天地経綸の主体なり、 (hito wa tenchi keirin no shutai nari)
神人合一して (shinjin gōitsu shite)
茲に無限の権力を発揮す。 (koko ni mugen no kenryoku o hakki su)

The fundamental ways to reach God are called the Three Great Rules of Learning (三大学則, sandai gakusoku):

- Body of God should be known through observation of the truth of the universe. (天地の真象を観察して、真神の体を思考すべし, tenchi no shinshō o kansatsu shite, shinkami no karada o shikō subeshi)
- Force of God should be known through the preciseness of motions of everything. (万有の運化の毫差なきを視て、真神の力を思考すべし, ban'yu no unka no naki o mite, shinkami no chikara o shikō subeshi)
- Spirit of God should be known through recognition of souls of lives. (活物の心性を覚悟して真神の霊魂を思考すべし, katsumono no shinsei o kakugo shite shinkami no reikon o shikō subeshi)

The Four Teachings (四大綱領, shidai kōryō) are:

- Rites and governance following the Way of the kami (祭：惟神の大道, matsuri – kannagara no daidō)
- Doctrine teaching the truth of heaven (教：天授の真理, oshie – tenju no shinri). Oshie ('doctrine') is summarized in the 2018 book Oomoto no oshie (大本のおしえ).
- Traditional norms, following the Way of God and man (慣：天人道の常, narawashi – tenjindō no tsune)
- Appropriate work (造：適宜の事務, nariwai – tekigi no jimu)

The Four Principles (四大主義, shidai shugi) are:

- Purity – purification of mind and body (清潔主義：心身修祓の大道, seiketsu shugi – shinshin shūbatsu no daidō)
- Optimism – faith in the goodness of the Way of the Gods (楽天主義：天地惟神の大道, rakuten shugi – tenchi kannagara no taidō)
- Progressivism – way of social improvement (進展主義：社会改善の大道, shinten shugi – shakai kaizen no daidō)
- Unification – the reconciliation of all dichotomies (統一主義：上下一致の大道, tōitsu shugi – jōge itchi no daidō)

A core Oomoto teaching is:

- All religions spring from the same root (万教同根, bankyō dōkon) – This was first mentioned as 諸教同根 (shōkeu dōkon) in Chapter 6, Volume 23 of the Reikai Monogatari. This phrase encapsulates Onisaburo Deguchi's view of Shinto as a universalist religion, rather than as an isolationist religious tradition indigenous to Japan. In Seicho-No-Ie, a religion founded by Oomoto follower Masaharu Taniguchi, this is reworded as "All religions are one" (万教帰一, bankyō kītsu).

== Beliefs and theology ==
Oomoto is essentially a neo-Shinto religious movement. Oomoto doctrine has also integrated kokugaku teachings and modern ideas on world harmony and peace.

=== God ===
In Oomoto, the one supreme God who created the universe is called Oomoto-sume-oomikami (大天主太神 or おおもとすめおおみかみ). Oomoto means "Great Origin", sume means "govern", and Oomikami means "God". All kami are considered to be manifestations of this one God. In an account from the Reikai Monogatari, the universe began with the sudden advent of "ヽ" (hochi). It then develops into "◉" (su). This is the kotodama of su and is the great origin of God.

=== Kami ===
Members of Oomoto believe in several kami, which are minor deities or spirits. The most important are Ushitora no Konjin, the kami of Nao Deguchi's initial divine possession in 1892; Ookunitokotachi; and Hitsujisaru. Various religious figures from other religions, or even notable non-religious figures, are recognized as kami—for example, the creator of Esperanto, L. L. Zamenhof.

=== Cosmology ===
Oomoto's goal is the realization of the world of Miroku or Miroku no yo (みろくの世) ('the world to come'), which means heaven in the real world. It is expressed in various ways, such as "from plum blossom to pine" (梅で開いて松で治める, ume de aite matsu de osameru) (mentioned at the beginning of the Oomoto Shin'yu), "purification of the world", "the opening of Amano-Iwato of the world", "the world of clear quartz", and so on.

Oomoto recognizes two realms, the physical world and the spiritual world (霊界, reikai), both of which are interconnected. In turn, the spiritual world consists of three parts:

- Heaven (高天原, Takama-no-hara) (lit. 'high plain of heaven')
- Purgatory (天の八衢, Ame-no-yachimata) (lit. 'eight sections of heaven')
- Underworld (根国, Ne-no-kuni) (lit. 'root country')

Nao Deguchi's prophecies stated that events which occur in Ayabe would also occur in Japan or throughout the world. The Japanese government's suppression of Oomoto, consisting of the 1921 and 1935 Oomoto incidents, is considered to have been an omen of World War II and the consequent destruction of Japan.

== Meal prayer ==
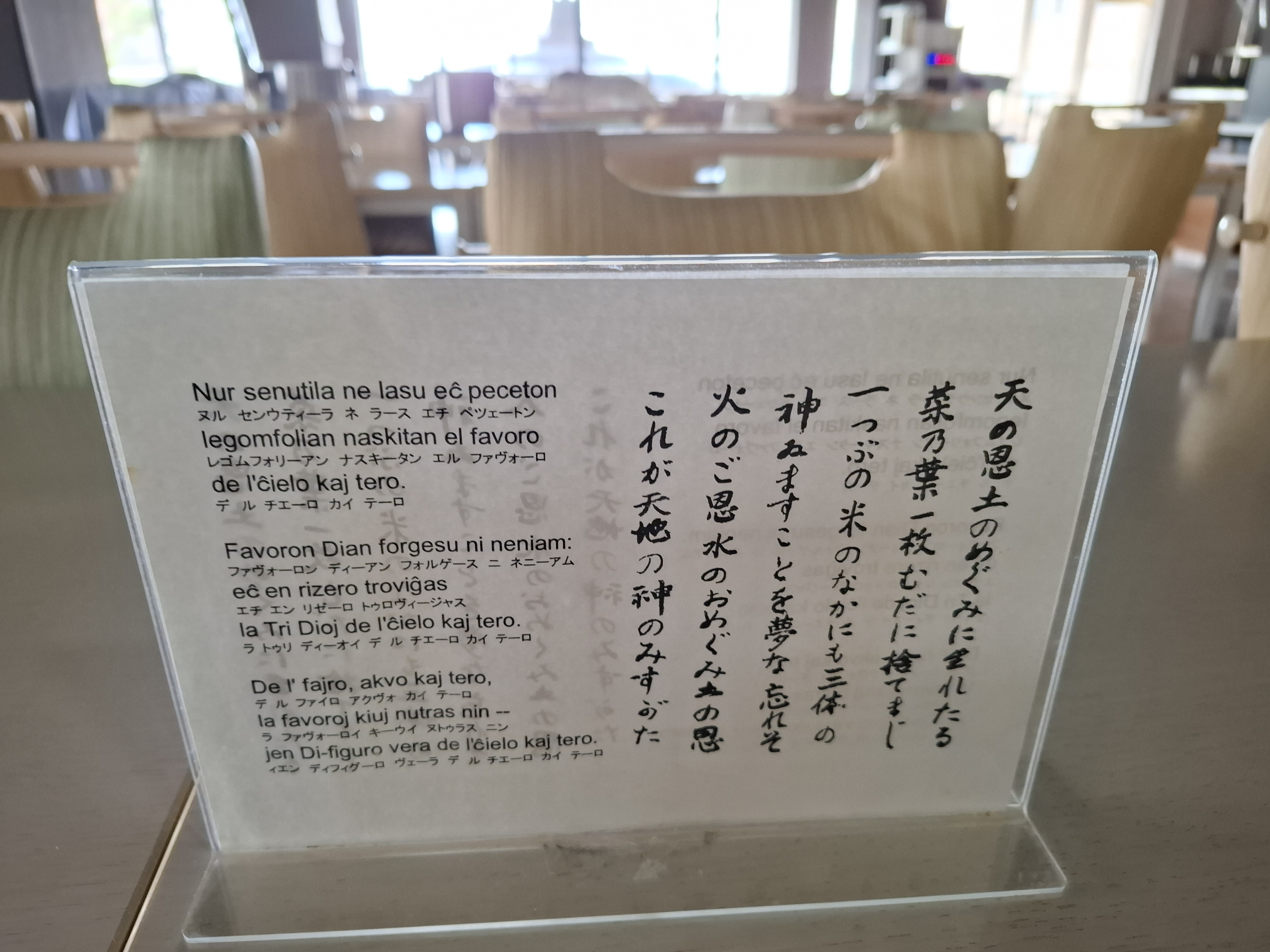
A bilingual Esperanto-Japanese prayer in appreciation of food at the Oomoto headquarters' cafeteria in Kameoka, Kyoto

In Oomoto, a prayer is often recited before meals, after which "itadakimasu" is said. The prayer consists of three tanka poems (known in Japanese as the "Three-Poem Song" 三首のお歌) composed by Oomoto's second spiritual leader, Sumiko Deguchi (1883–1952). In 1976, Oomoto's third spiritual leader Naohi Deguchi adopted the prayer for use before meals. The prayer in Japanese, along with a literal English translation, is as follows.

Japanese (original text)

天(てん)の恩(おん)地(ち)のめぐみに生(うま)れたる
菜(な)乃(の)葉(は)一(いち)枚(まい)むだに捨(す)てまじ

一つぶの米(こめ)のなかにも三(さん)体(たい)の
神(みず)いますことを夢(ゆめ)な忘(わす)れそ

火(ひ)のご恩(おん)水(みず)のおめぐみ地(ち)の恩(おん)
これが天(てん)地(ち)の神(かみ)のみすがた

English (literal translation)

Let not a single leaf, born from the blessings of heaven and earth, be thrown away in vain.

Let us never forget that even in a single grain of rice are the Three Gods.

The blessings of fire, water, and earth: These are the forms of the gods of heaven and earth.

The official Esperanto and Portuguese translations of the prayer, which do not always follow the exact meaning of the Japanese original, are:

Esperanto (official translation)

Nur senutila ne lasu eĉ peceton
legomfolian naskitan el favoro
de l'ĉielo kaj tero.

Favoron Dian forgesu ni neniam:
eĉ en rizero troviĝas
la Tri Dioj de l'ĉielo kaj tero.

De l'fajro, akvo kaj tero,
la favoroj kiuj nutras nin –
jen Di-figuro vera de l'ĉielo kaj tero.

Portuguese (official translation)

Não devemos desprezar
nem mesmo uma folha,
pois tudo é criado pela graça de Deus.

Em nenhum momento devemos nos esquecer
que existe a graça de Deus,
mesmo num grão de arroz.

Deus se manifesta no Universo através
das graças concedidas pelo fogo,
pela água, pela terra.

== Notable followers ==
One of the more well-known followers of Oomoto was Morihei Ueshiba, a Japanese martial artist and the founder of Aikido. It is commonly thought that Ueshiba's increasing attachment to pacifism in later years and belief that Aikido should be an "art of peace" were inspired by his involvement with the sect. Oomoto priests oversee a ceremony in Ueshiba's honor every April 29 at the Aiki Shrine at Iwama.

Onisaburo Deguchi taught a type of meditation and spirit possession technique called chinkon kishin (鎮魂帰神) to some of his most devoted followers, many of whom went on to establish their own religions. They include:

- Masaharu Taniguchi (谷口雅春), founder of Seicho-No-Ie, was a follower of Oomoto prior to founding his own religion.
- Mokichi Okada (岡田茂吉), founder of the Church of World Messianity (a.k.a. Sekai Kyūsei-kyō), was a follower of Oomoto prior to founding his own religion.
- Wasaburō Asano (浅野和三郎), a spiritualist who founded the Psychic Science Research Society (心霊科学研究会, Shinrei kagaku kenkyūkai)
- Yonosuke Nakano (中野與之助), founder of Ananaikyo, was originally an Oomoto follower before founding his own religion.
- Yoshisane Tomokiyo (友清歓真), founder of Shintō Tenkōkyo, was originally an Oomoto follower before founding his own religion.

More recent Oomoto followers during the late 20th and 21st centuries include:

- Alex Kerr, American writer and Japanologist, worked for the Oomoto Foundation for 20 years starting in 1977.
- Bill Roberts, American writer active at the Oomoto Foundation
- Haruhisa Handa, founder of the religious organization World Mate
- Yamantaka Eye, visual artist, DJ and member of avant musical group Boredoms

== Oomoto-inspired religions ==
Various religions have been inspired by Oomoto, many of which were founded by Oomoto followers familiar with chinkon kishin (鎮魂帰神) (lit. 'calming the soul and returning to the divine') as practiced in Oomoto. Since Oomoto believes that "all religions come from the same root" (万教同根, bankyō dōkon), these other new religious movements are not seen as heretical, but are in fact even encouraged.

- Ananaikyo
- Shintō Tenkōkyo
  - Ko-Shintō Senpōkyō
- Seicho-No-Ie
- Shōroku Shintō Yamatoyama
- "Divine light" (johrei / okiyome-practicing) religions
  - Church of World Messianity and related splinter groups such as Shinji Shumeikai
  - Mahikari movement religions (including Sukyo Mahikari and World Divine Light)
- World Mate, founded by Haruhisa Handa in 1984
- Hikari Kyōkai (ひかり教会), founded by Okamoto Tenmei (1897–1963)
- Oomoto Hikari no Michi (大夲光之道), headquartered in Toyooka

Many of these religions have meditation and divine healing practices derived from Oomoto's chinkon kishin (鎮魂帰神). They include:

- chinkon kishin (鎮魂帰神) in Ananaikyō
- chinkon kishin (鎮魂帰神) in Shintō Tenkōkyo
- chinkon (鎮魂) in Yamakage Shinto
- shinsōkan (神想観) in Seicho-No-Ie
- jōrei (浄霊) in Sekai Kyūseikyō
- okiyome (お浄め) in Mahikari
- seishin tōitsu in Asano Wasaburō (浅野和三郎)'s spiritualist organizations

Various practices and teachings in Makoto no Michi are inspired by Oomoto, including similar spirit possession practices. Makoto no Michi's sacred geography is derived from that of the Reikai Monogatari, in which Japan is viewed as a model (雛形, hinagata) of the world. Hokkaido is viewed as the equivalent of North America, Honshu as Eurasia, Shikoku as Australia, Kyushu as Africa, Taiwan as South America, and so on; these equivalences stem from their common mythical origins during the creation of the world. The geographic equivalents of the main Japanese islands and Taiwan with the world's continents are identical in both Oomoto and Makoto no Michi.
