= Onisaburo Deguchi =

Japanese founder and leader of the Oomoto religion

- 出口 王仁三郎
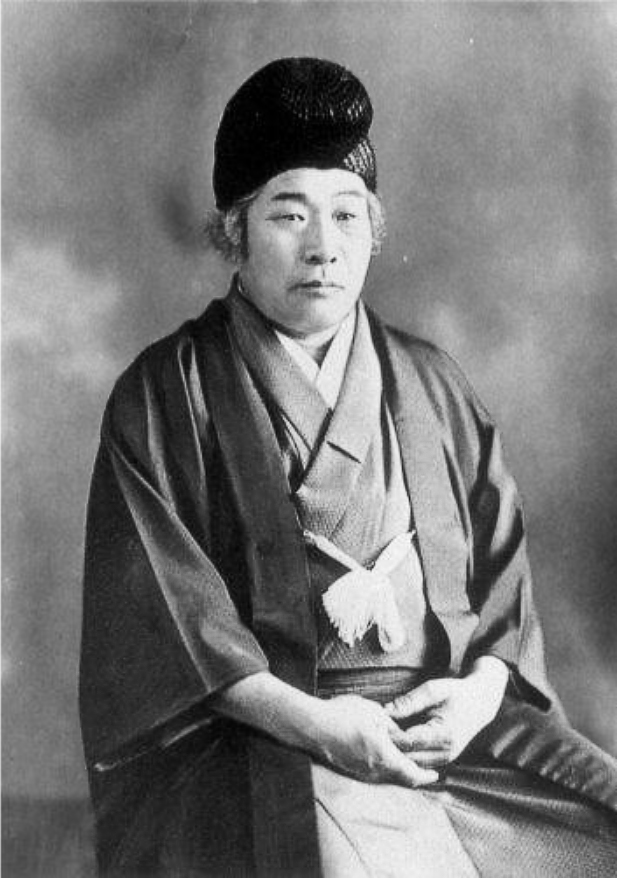
- Deguchi in 1940

Personal life
- Born: Kisaburō Ueda (上田 喜三郎); 21 August 1871 Tanba Province
- Died: 19 January 1948 (aged 76)
- Resting place: Ayabe, Kyoto; 35°17′12″N 135°15′20″E
- Spouse: Sumi Deguchi
- Children: Naohi Deguchi

Religious life
- Religion: Oomoto

Onisaburo Deguchi (出口 王仁三郎, Deguchi Onisaburō), born Kisaburō Ueda 上田 喜三郎 (1871–1948) was a Japanese religious leader. Together with his mother-in-law Nao Deguchi, he was one of the two spiritual leaders of the Oomoto religious movement in Japan. While Nao Deguchi is the Foundress (開祖, Kaiso) of Oomoto, Onisaburo Deguchi is the Holy Teacher (聖師, Seishi).

== Biography ==
Onisaburo had studied Honda Chikaatsu's Spirit Studies (Honda Reigaku) and also learned to mediate spirit possession (chinkon kishin 鎮魂帰神) from Honda's disciple Nagasawa Katsutate (長澤雄楯) in Shimizu, Shizuoka. Starting from March 1, 1898, he followed a hermit named Matsuoka Fuyō (松岡芙蓉), who was a messenger of the kami Kono-hana-saku-ya-hime-no-mikoto (木花咲耶姫命), to a cave on Mount Takakuma near Kameoka, Kyoto, where Onisaburo performed intense ascetic training for one week. While enduring cold weather with only a cotton robe, as well as hunger and thirst, Onisaburo received divine revelations and claimed to have traveled into the spirit world.

Onisaburo met the founder of Omotokyo in 1898 and in 1899 they established the Kinmeikai, later called Kinmei Reigakkai. In 1900, Kisaburō married Nao's fifth daughter Sumi (also known as Sumiko) and adopted the name Deguchi Onisaburō. Oomoto teaches that the guardian spirit of Nao is Amaterasu, described as a male spirit in a female body, and Onisaburo's spirit is Susanowo, a female spirit in a male body.

In 1905, he published Michi no Shiori (道の栞) (lit. 'Guide to the Way'), for which Esperanto and Portuguese translations were published in 1997. Another book similar in length and topic, Michi no Hikari (道の光) (lit. 'Light on the Way'), was also published. Onisaburo Deguchi also wrote the Three Mirrors or San Kagami (三鏡, 844 chapters total), which consists of the Water Mirror (水鏡, 249 chapters), Moon Mirror (月鏡, 212 chapters), and Jade Mirror (玉鏡, 383 chapters).

In 1908, he and Deguchi Nao founded the Dai Nihon Shūseikai (大日本修斎会), which in 1913 became Taihonkyō (大本教) and in 1916 the Kōdō Ōmoto (皇道大本). Soon afterwards, he began publishing a periodical journal called Shinreikai (神霊界; "World of Gods and Spirits"). In 1923, he learned Esperanto, an international planned language, and introduced it to the activities of Oomoto. In 1924, retired naval captain Yutaro Yano and his associates within the Black Dragon Society invited Onisaburo on a journey to Mongolia. Onisaburo led a group of Oomoto disciples, including Aikido founder Morihei Ueshiba. Ikki Kita had previously been sent to China by the Black Dragon Society and had proposed in for Esperanto to be the only language spoken in the Empire of Japan.

During the Ōmoto Incident, he had been detained for about six years and a half since his arrest in 1935.

He is remembered as a jovial patriarch of that school and is best known to Westerners as a teacher and religious instructor of Morihei Ueshiba, the founder of Aikido.

A believer in the Oomoto maxim that it was humanity's duty to move forward together, bringing about a new age of existence on Earth, Onisaburo went to great lengths to promote the syncretic faith preached by Nao Deguchi. He wrote the Reikai Monogatari (Tales of the Spirit World), an 81-volume work that covered his alleged travels into the spiritual planes of existence, as well as many other theologically permeated stories which expounded on numerous Oomoto spiritual ideals.

Onisaburo Deguchi also wrote numerous other texts, such as Michi no Oomoto (道の大本) and Tama no Ishizue (霊の礎).

Throughout his life, Onisaburo was often quite flamboyant, taking delight in wearing richly textured costumes of his own design and posing as a wide variety of deities, mostly Buddhist or Shinto. He would also dress like a shaman, and often even took up the appearances of female divinities. His outlook on life tended to be eclectic, sometimes even to the point of being outrageous. At varying points of his lifetime, he claimed to be an incarnation of Miroku Butsu (i.e., Maitreya Buddha), and often referred to himself as a remodeler of the world.

Like most Oomoto followers, Onisaburo believed that the original kami founders of Japan were driven away by the kami of the imperial line. This placed him in opposition to the authorities at the time, though he had the ability to hide it. This again differentiated him from Nao Deguchi, who was more open and direct in her proclamations. Onisaburo was quite talented in quieting the government officials while at the same time subverting their efforts that he found distasteful or amoral.

Onisaburo's legacy is largely concerned with art, including a wealth of calligraphic and poetic works. He also dabbled in cinema, sculpture, and pottery, leaving behind thousands of items that are now considered by many enthusiasts to be of great value. Onisaburo is known for the coining the proverb "Art is the mother of religion" (芸術は宗教の母, geijutsu wa shūkyō no haha).

== Sacred sites ==
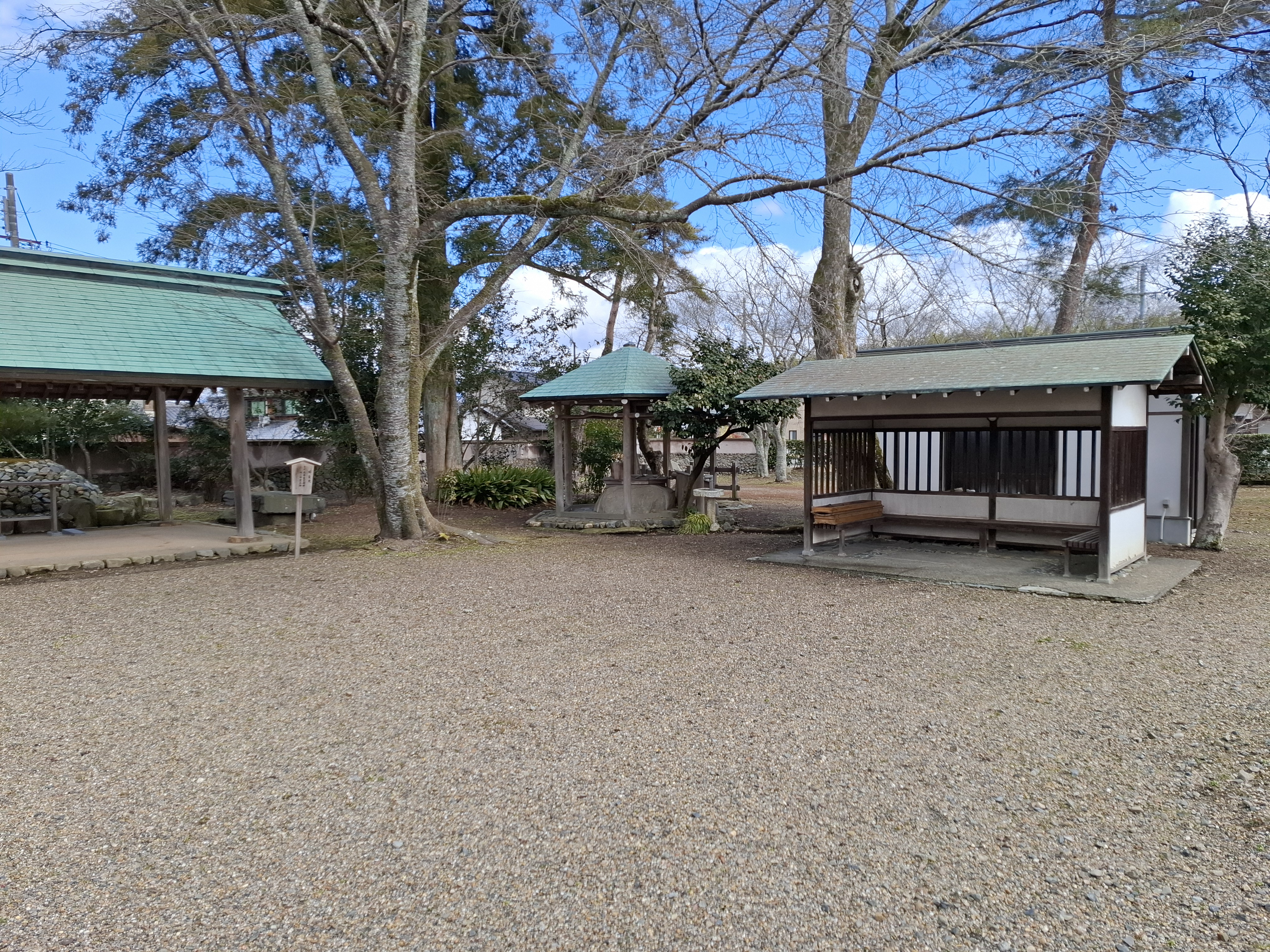
Zuisen-en (瑞泉苑) in Anao village, Kameoka. According to Michi no Shiori, "The spring from which the teaching was born came forth in Anao in Sogabe."

Some Oomoto sacred sites associated with Onisaburo Deguchi include:

- The Cave of Onisaburo Deguchi on Mount Takakuma, where Onisaburo entered the spirit world during his asceticism there during the first half of 1898. Today, Oomoto followers organize monthly pilgrimages to the cave.
- Zuisen-en (瑞泉苑), the historic site of Onisaburo's birth home in Anao, Kameoka. The site was destroyed during the Second Oomoto Incident in 1935 but was rebuilt shortly after the end of World War II. It is located next to Kongo-ji (金剛寺) in Anao. Zuisen-en is noted for its holy well mentioned in various Oomoto scriptures.
- Okutsuki (奥都城) cemetery in Ayabe, where Onisaburo Deguchi is buried in a mound. His mother-in-law Nao Deguchi and wife Sumi Deguchi are buried in adjacent mounds. Nao Deguchi is buried in the front right mound, and Onisaburo Deguchi is buried in the front left mound, while Sumi Deguchi's mound is located just behind the two front mounds.

== Selected works ==
Onisaburo Deguchi was a highly prolific writer. As a result, the list of works below consists of a selection of some of his most representative sacred writings, and is far from exhaustive.

- Michi no Shiori (道の栞, composed in 1904 and published in 1905) (online text). Translated into Esperanto, Portuguese, and English in 1997.
- Michi no Hikari (道の光, composed in 1903 and 1905; later published in 1920). Excerpted from Chapter 6 (玉の礎) and Chapter 9 (道の大本) in Oni bunko (王仁文庫). Various passages in Michi no Hikari contain paraphrases from the New Testament gospels, particularly the Sermon on the Mount.
- Michi no Oomoto (道の大本, composed in 1905 and published in 1927). (online text)
- Izunome Shin'yu (伊都能売神諭, 37 volumes, composed during 1918–1919) (online text)
- Reikai Monogatari (81 volumes composed during 1921–1926 and 1933–1934) (online text)
  - Tama no Ishizue (霊の礎, 11 pieces composed around 1922 and published in 1924). These texts show influences from Honda Chikaatsu (本田親徳), from whom Onisaburo Deguchi derived his practice of chinkon kishin (鎮魂帰神), and from Emanuel Swedenborg's spiritualism. They are in volumes 16–20, 23, 24, 37. (Tenseisha book)
  - Oomoto sanbika (大本讃美歌), songs of praise from volumes 61 and 62 of the Reikai Monogatari
- Three Mirrors (三鏡 San Kagami, 844 chapters total). Dictated by Onisaburo Deguchi from 1925 to 1934. A 1958 edition was published in 1958 by Tenseisha (天声社), Oomoto's publishing house. The most recent complete edition was published in 1999 by Hachiman Shoten (八幡書店). (online text)
  - Water Mirror (水鏡, 249 chapters)
  - Moon Mirror (月鏡, 212 chapters)
  - Jade Mirror (玉鏡, 383 chapters)
- Oomoto sendenka-shū (大本宣伝歌集) (1926). Historically, these were songs sung by Oomoto missionaries during their proselytization activities.
- Azuma no Hikari (東の光) (1931, with 4,943 poems)
- Kannagara no Michi (惟神の道) (1932–1935, with 106 essays). This is a collection of 106 essays that were originally published by Onisaburo Deguchi in the newspaper Jinrui Aizen Shinbun (人類愛善新聞) between 1932 and 1935. The newspaper essays often did not contain Deguchi's original words, since they were edited and redacted by other editors. The essays were published as a book on December 5, 1935. These essays were published 3 days before the Second Oomoto Incident and were banned by the government immediately afterwards. However, they have since been republished in 1994. (online text)
- Oomoto no Michi (大本の道, "The Path of Oomoto"). Consists of 1,068 poems published in 1957, which is a revised edition of Aizen no Michi (愛善の道) (1947, with 497 poems). The poems summarize the basic teachings of Oomoto. (online text)
