= Shinto sects and schools =

Divisions of the Japanese folk religion

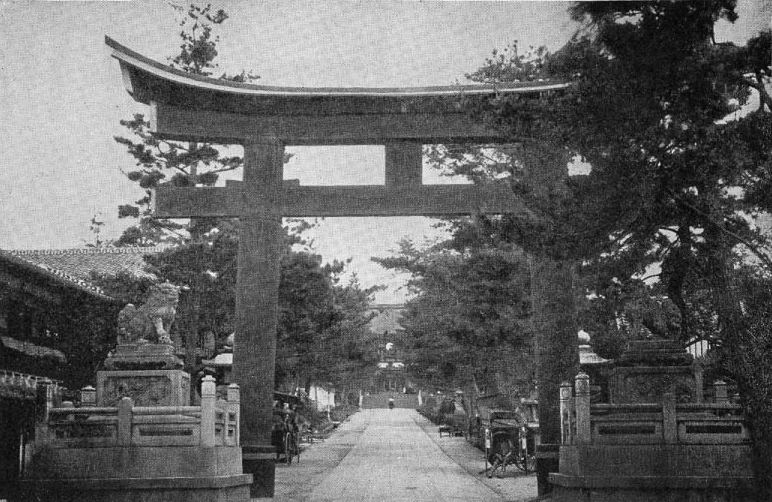
Torii gate typical of Shinto shrines

Shinto (神道, shintō), the folk religion of Japan, developed a diversity of schools and sects, outbranching from the original Ko-Shintō (ancient Shintō) since Buddhism was introduced into Japan in the sixth century.

== Early period schools and groups ==
The main Shinto schools with traditions traceable to early periods, according to authoritative published records, can be grouped by lineage and outside influence as follows:

=== Buddhist-influenced (仏家神道) ===
These are various forms of Shintō developed by Buddhist thinkers, combining Buddhist and Shintō elements (Shinbutsu shūgō).

Taishi-ryū Shintō (太子流神道)
Founded by Prince Shōtoku (574–622), unifying Shintō, Confucianism, and Buddhism (sankyō itchi).

Ryōbu Shintō (両部神道)
Derived from Shingon Buddhism. Relates the Inner Shrine of Ise with Dainichi of the Womb Realm (taizōkai) and the Outer Shrine with Dainichi of the Vajra realm (kongōkai).
- Miwa-ryū Shintō (三輪流神道) – Developed at Byōdōji and Ōgorinji (Ōmiwadera), temples serving as jingū-ji of Ōmiwa Shrine.
- Goryū Shintō (御流神道) – A sub-branch of Ryōbu Shintō distinguished by its five transmission lineages.
- Unden Shintō (雲伝神道, also Katsuragi Shintō) – Founded by Jiun Onkō (1718–1804), a Shingon monk. Integrates esoteric Buddhism, Sanskrit philology, Zen, Confucianism, and native Shinto concepts.

Sannō Shintō (山王神道)
Tendai sect Shintō, based on the cult of the Mountain King (山王, Sannō) at Hiyoshi Taisha.

Hokke Shintō (法華神道)
Doctrines influenced by Nichiren, incorporating kami cults within its system.

Reisō Shintō (霊宗神道)
Buddhist Shintō created in the Edo period by Chōon Dōkai (1628–1695) and further developed by Jōin (1683–1739). Also known as Reishū Shintō.

Shugendō (修験道)
A mountain ascetic tradition seeking supranormal power through practice. Historically subordinate to Buddhism, later developed branches with more Buddhist or Koshintō influence.

Kōshin (庚申)
A folk faith with Taoist origins, influenced by Shinto, Buddhism, and local beliefs.

=== Court, hereditary, and ancient lineages ===
Hakke Shintō (伯家神道)
The Shirakawa Hakuō House, hereditary holders of the Jingi-haku post of the Department of Divinities (Jingi-kan). Also called Shirakawa Shintō (白川神道).

Inbe Shintō (忌部神道)
Lineage of the Inbe clan (忌部氏), created by Inbe Masamichi, historically responsible for court rituals along with the Nakatomi clan.

Jingidōke
A collective term for lineages mainly occupied with Shinto, including the jingi clans (jingi shizoku 神祇氏族) and clans connected to the Jingi-kan such as the Nakatomi and Inbe.

Kaden Shintō
Shinto transmitted by hereditary shrine priests (shinshokuke or shake). Also called shake Shintō, shaden Shintō, or densha Shintō.

Kikke Shintō
Transmitted by the Tachibana clan; widely known during the mid-Edo Hōei era (1704–1710).

Mononobe Shintō (物部神道)
Based on the text Sendai kuji hongi taiseikyō.

Tsuchimikado Shinto (土御門神道)
Created by court diviner Tsuchimikado Yasutomi, integrating astrological and calendrical theories of the Abe clan (Onmyōdō).

Tsushima Shintō (対馬神道)
Founded on Tsushima Island in the Sea of Japan.

Uden Shintō (烏伝神道)
Created by Kamo no Norikiyo (a.k.a. Umetsuji no Norikiyo, 1798–1862) based on transmissions at Kamo wake Ikazuchi Jinja.

Ise Shintō (伊勢神道)
Transmitted by priests of the Watarai clan at the Outer Shrine (Gekū) of the Grand Shrine of Ise (Ise Jingū). Also called Watarai Shintō (度会神道).

=== Restorationist schools (復古神道) ===
Restorationist Shinto schools were created in order to purify Shinto of all foreign influences and return to the pure standard of Ancient Shintō.

Yoshida Shintō (吉田神道)
Founded by Yoshida Kanetomo (1435–1511), who called his tradition Yuiitsu Shintō (唯一神道, "One-and-only Shintō"). Until the end of the Edo period, Yoshida Shrine retained the right to award ranks to most shrines and priests.

=== Confucian-influenced (儒家神道) ===
Shinto explained by Japanese Confucianists, claiming unity of Shinto and Confucianism often in opposition or claiming superiority over Buddhism. Born out of a less extreme and more Sinocentric strain of the restorationist movement.

Ritō Shinchi Shintō (理当心地神道)
Created by Confucian scholar Hayashi Razan (1583–1657), the only Confucian scholar officially employed by the Tokugawa shogunate.

Suika Shintō (垂加神道)
Created by Yamazaki Ansai, a Confucian–Shintoist of the early Edo period. Also known as Suiga Shintō. Ōgimachi Shintō (正親町神道) is a form of Suika Shintō transmitted by Ōgimachi Kinmichi (1653–1733) to the sovereign and court retainers.

Yoshikawa Shintō (吉川神道)
Lineage transmitted by scholar Yoshikawa Koretari (1616–1694).

== Present Shinto Sects ==
There are thirteen sects of prewar Shintō:

Fuso-kyo (扶桑教)
Organized by Shishino Nakaba (1844–84) based on the mountain faith to Mount Fuji (Fuji shinkō) founded by Hasegawa Kakugyō (1541?–1646?).

Izumo Ōyashirokyō (出雲大社教)
Founded by Senge Takatomi (1845–1918).

Jikkō kyō (実行教)
Based on Fujidō, founded by Hasegawa Kakugyō (born in Nagasaki, 1541–1646). A mountain faith focused on Mount Fuji (Fuji shinkō).

Konkōkyō (金光教)
Founded by Konkō Daijin (1814–83) (born Akazawa Bunji).

Kurozumikyō (黒住教)
Founded by Kurozumi Munetada (1780–1850).

Misogikyo (禊教)
Founded by Inoue Masakane (1790–1849).

Ontakekyō (御嶽教)
Centered on faith in Mount Ontake (ontake shinkō).

Shinrikyo (神理教)
Founded by Sano Tsunehiko (1834–1906).

Shinshūkyō (神習教)
Founded by Yoshimura Masamochi (1839–1915).

Shinto Shusei (神道修成派)
Founded by Nitta Kuniteru (1829–1902).

Shintō Taikyō (神道大教)
Known previously as Shintō Honkyoku (its formal name was simply "Shintō").

Shintō Taiseikyō (神道大成教)
Founded by Hirayama Seisai (1815–1890).

== Shintō-derived New Religious Movements ==
Ananaikyō (三五教)
An Ōmoto-lineage religion founded by Nakano Yonosuke (1887–1974).

Byakkō Shinkōkai (白光真宏会)
Founded by Goi Masahisa (1916–1980) emphasizes two characteristic Ōmoto doctrines, the notion that all religions emanate from the same root (bankyō dōkon), and the principle of world peace.

Chikakusan Minshukyō Kyōdan
Based on the mountain-worship cult of Mount Ontake in the Kiso region founded by Nehashi Umetarō (1868–1922) as the Chikaku Kōsha (Chikaku Religious Association).

Chūshinkai
A movement focused on divination and onomancy, founded by Kumazaki Ken'ō (1881–1961).

Daihizenkyō (大日然教)
Founded by Orimo Nami (1893–1966).

Ennōkyō (円応教)
Founded by Fukada Chiyoko (1887–1925).

Hachidai Ryūō Daishizen Aishinkyōdan
Founded by Ishikawa Sen (1886–1961), who declared to be possessed (kamigakari) by a spirit.

Hachidai Ryūōjin Hakkō Seidan
Founded by Demura Ryūsei (1926– ).

Hachirakukai Kyōdan
Founded by Ogawa Kōichirō (1919–80).

Hi no Oshie
Teaching of the Sun. Founded by Sakuma Nikkō (1884–1954) (Nikkō means "sun-light").

Hikari Kyōkai (ひかり教会)
Derived from Ōmoto. Founded by painter Okamoto Tenmei (1897–1963).

Hizuki no Miya
Founded by Fujimoto Toshinari (1930–1989). The founding of the religion is dated from January 11, 1956, when Fujimoto received a revelation from the kami Amaterasu ōmikami.

Honbushin (ほんぶしん)
A group from Tenrikyō lineage. Founded by Ōnishi Tama (1916–1969), the group was founded in 1961 within Honmichi as the Tenri Mirokukai (Tenri Miroku Association) and later seceded.

Honmichi ((ほんみち)
Founded by Ōnishi Aijirō (1881–1958), a former Tenrikyō missionary.

Ijun (いじゅん)
Founded by Takayasu Ryūsen (1934–) as an Okinawan religion.

Ishinkyō
Founded by Hashiguchi Reizui (1879–1963).

Izumo Shin’yū Kyōkai
Founded in 1968 by Hosoya Seiko (細矢靖子, 1927–) after she had practiced austerities in Izumo, Nara and Eiheiji.

Izumokyō (出雲教)
This is a religion reminiscent of sectarian Shinto (Kyōha Shintō). It was started by Kitajima Naganori (1834–93).

Jieidō
Lineage of Sekai Kyūseikyō, founded by Katsunuma Hisako (1927–).

Jingūkyō (神宮教)
With characteristics of Sect Shinto (Kyōha Shintō) and founded by Urata Nagatami and others.

Kakushin Shūkyō Nipponkyō
Founded in 1940, when the "Father-deity Kotoshironushi no ōkami" descended upon Chitose Makami (1879–1986).

Kami Ichijōkyō (神一条教)
A Tenrikyō-lineage group founded by Yonetani Kuni (米谷クニ) (1889–1974).

Kannagarakyō (神ながら教)
Founded by Mizuno Fusa (1883–1970).

Kikueikai Kyōdan
Founded in 1928 by the sculptor of Buddhist images Hayashi Shikō (1901–88). Shikō claimed that a golden sphere with the form of a "nine-star divination pattern" came floating towards him, after which he began to engage in spiritual healing.

Kogi Shintō
Founded by the Shinto priest Kuwabara Yachio (1910–) after World War II.

Koshintō Senpōkyō
Founded by Masai Yoshimitsu (1907–1970), and known for its claim to be related to the tradition of "ancient Shinto" (Koshintō).

Kōso Kōtai Jingū Amatsukyō (皇祖皇太神宮天津教)
Founded by Takeuchi Kiyomaro (also Ōmaro) (1874–1965) based on the Takeuchi Documents (Takeuchi monjo), claimed to be rediscovered ancient texts.

Kuzuryū Taisha
Founded by Ōnishi Masajirō (1913–88) after receiving a dream oracle from the deity Benzaiten (Sanskrit Sarasvati) during a dream in 1954.

Kyūseishukyō
Resulting from the merging of four branches of Sekai Kyūseikyō, it began its activities in 1955 after the death of the founder of Sekai Kyūseikyō, Okada Mokichi (1882–1955).

Makoto no Michi (真の道)
Founded by Hagiwara Makoto (1910–81) who experienced paranormal powers since before World War II.

Makoto no Michikyō
Founded by Matsumoto Jōtarō (September 1881–1944).

Maruyamakyō (丸山教)
Founded by Itō Rokurobei (1829–94).

Misogikyō Shinpa
Founded by Sakata Yasuhiro (1962–).

Mitamakyō
Founded by Nagata Fuku (1891–1975).

Miyaji Shinsendō
Founded by Miyaji Suii (known as Kakiwa, 1852–1904) and with strong Taoist influence.

Nihon Jingū Honchō
Founded by Nakajima Shūkō (1902–88) who was deeply interested in the study of the traditional calendar (rekigaku) and the theory of five phases of matter (gogyō).

Nihon Seidō Kyōdan
Founded by Iwasaki Shōō (1934–) who had a mystical experience while in a coma.

Nikkōkyō (日光教)
Founded by Teraguchi Kōjirō (1881–1960).

Ōkanmichi (おうかんみち)
Founded by Yamada Baijirō (1875–1941), a Tenrikyō teacher.

Ōmiwakyō (Sako)
Founded by Sako Kan (1878–1937).

Ōmiwakyō (Kojima)
Founded by Kojima Moriyoshi in 1872.

Ōmoto (大本)
Founded by Deguchi Nao (1836–1918) and Deguchi Onisaburō (1871–1948) after a "spirit dream" at the lunar New Year in 1892.

Ōmoto Hikari no Michi (大本光之道)
Founded by Hōkan Meikyō (1923–) based on Ōmoto and Sekai Kyūseikyō.

Ōyamanezu no Mikoto Shinji Kyōkai (大山ねずの命神示教会)
Founded by Inai Sadao (1906–88).

Perfect Liberty Kyōdan (PL Kyōdan) (パーフェクト リバティー教団)
Known as Church of Perfect Liberty frequently abbreviated as merely "PL", founded by Miki Tokuharu (1871–1938), a Zen monk.

Reiha no Hikari Kyōkai (霊波之光教会)
Founded by Hase Yoshio (1915–84).

Renmonkyō (蓮門教)
Founded by Shimamura Mitsu (1831–1904) who was saved from serious illness by Yanagita Ichibei, who had studied the "marvelous law of things" (myōhō no ji).

Renshindō Kyōdan
Founded by Tanaka Jigohei (1886–1973).

Samuhara Jinja
Started in 1935 when Tanaka Tomisaburō (1868–1967) rebuilt a dilapidated shrine in Okayama.

Seichō no Ie (生長の家)
Connected to Ōmoto and founded by Taniguchi Masaharu (1893–1985).

Seikōkyō
Founded by Fujita Nobuhiko (1889–1977).

Seimeikyō
Derived from Sekai Kyūseikyō and created in 1955 by Kihara Yoshihiko.

Seishin Myōjōkai
Founded by Fujita Motonari (1903–85).

Sekai Kyūseikyō (世界救世教)
Church of World Messianity from the Ōmoto lineage. It was founded by Okada Mokichi.

Sekai Mahikari Bunmei Kyōdan (世界真光文明教団)
Also known as World Divine Light outside Japan, it is one of the Mahikari movement Okada Kōtama (1901–1974, born Yoshikazu) founded the Mahikari religion, which then split into Sukyo Mahikari and Sekai Mahikari Bunmei Kyōdan (World Divine Light) upon his death.

Sekai Shindōkyō (世界心道教)
Founded by Aida Hide (1898–1973).

Shidaidō (四大道)
Founded by Nagahashi Yasuhiko (1895–1981) in 1931.

Shikō Gakuen
Founded by Kawakami Seizan (1908–51).

Shin Nihon Shūkyō Dantai Rengōkai
Federation of New Religious Organizations of Japan, founded by and for new Japanese religious movements. Established in 1951 with a membership of twenty-four groups.

Shindō Tenkōkyo (神道天行居)
Founded by Tomokiyo Yoshizane (1888–1952).

Shinji Shūmeikai (神慈秀明会)
Founded by Koyama Mihoko (1910–).

Shinmei Aishinkai (神命愛心会)
Founded by Komatsu Shin'yō (1928– ).

Shinreikai Kyōdan (神霊会教団)
Founded by Ishii Reizan (born Iwayoshi, 1884–58) who had a revelation in 1932.

Shinreikyō (神霊教)
Founded by Ōtsuka Kan'ichi (1891–72).

Shinri Jikkō no Oshie (真理実行の教)
Founded by Honjō Chiyoko (1902–1957).

Shinsei Tengan Manaita no Kai
Founded by Kurata Chikyū (1906–91).

Shintō Shinkyō
Founded by Unigame Ito (1876–1976).

Shintō Shinshinkyō
Founded by Adachi Taijūrō (1841–1895) who received a divine revelation after nine years of his own unique form of practice.

Shizensha
Founded by Hashimoto Satomi (1899–1984).

Shōroku Shintō Yamatoyama (松緑神道大和山)
Founded by Tazawa Seishirō (1884–1966) after dedicating a shrine to a "mountain kami" (yama no kami) in 1919, witnessing extraordinary astronomical phenomena, and hearing divine voices.

Shūyōdan Hōseikai (修養団捧誠会)
Founded by Idei Seitarō (1899–1983).

Soshindō
Started focused on Matsushita Matsuzō (1873–1947), a spirit medium (reinōsha) active from the Taisho era (1912–26) to the World War II period.

Soshindō Kyōdan
Founded by Yoshioka Tajūrō (1905–87).

Subikari Kōha Sekai Shindan
Founded by the spiritualist manga artist Kuroda Minoru (1928– ).

Sukui no Hikari Kyōdan (救いの光教団)
A new religion deriving from Sekai Kyūseikyō, one of several groups in opposition to that religion's policy of centralization (ichigenka) implemented in the mid-1960s.

Sūkyō Mahikari (崇教真光)
Derived from the lineages of Ōmoto and Sekai Kyūseikyō, founded by Kōtama Okada (Sukuinushisama) (1901–74) on August 28, 1959 and established as a registered religious organisation on 1978 by Mr Okada's daughter Sachiko Keishu Okada (Oshienushisama), (1929– ).

Sumerakyō
Founded by Onikura Taruhiko after having experienced possession (kamigakari) by a deity around 1919.

Taireidō
Founded by Tanaka Morihei (1884–1928) who was said to have acquired a kind of supranormal power (reishiryoku) after a four-month ascetic seclusion in the mountains.

Taiwa Kyōdan
Emerged from Yamatokyō, founded by Hozumi Kenkō (1913–76) and his wife Hisako (1908–2003).

Tamamitsu Jinja (玉光神社)
Founded by the spirit medium Motoyama Kinue (1909–74).

Ten'onkyo (天恩教)
Founded by Hachiro Fukuji (1899–1962) who experienced the ability to converse with a spirit, and thereafter received visitations from various deities.

Tenchikyō (天地教)
Founded by Uozumi Masanobu (1852–1928).

Tengenkyō
Founded by Naniwa Hisakazu (1902–84).

Tenjōkyō
Founded by Ishiguro Jō (1908– ).

Tenjōkyō Hon'in
Founded by Kuramoto Ito (1895–1985).

Tenkōkyō ((天光教)
Derived from Konkōkyō. Founded by Fujita Shinshō (?–1966) who received at age nineteen a revelation from a deity he called Tenchikane no kami ("heaven-earth gold deity").

Tenrikyō (天理教)
It was one of the thirteen sects of prewar Shinto. Founded by Nakayama Miki (1798–1887) after having a sudden experience of spirit possession (kamigakari) from a deity she called Tenri-O-no-Mikoto. in the tenth lunar month of 1863. Tenrikyo removed itself from its Sect Shinto classification when it was free to do so after World War II.

Tensei Shinbikai
Founded by Iwanaga Kayoko (1934–).

Tensenku Monkyō (Tendan)
Known locally as Tinsinkun Munchu (Tinkha), emerged from ancient Shintō (Koshintō) in the southern Ryukyu islands.

Tensha Tsuchimikado Shintō Honchō
Inspired in Tsuchimikado Shintō (Tensha Shintō).

Tenshin Seikyō
Founded by Shimada Seiichi (1896–1985).

Tenshindō Kyōdan
Founded by Tamura Reishō (1890–1968) who received the revelation of Kami on April 3, 1927. While working in the office of the Governor-General of Korea, Reishō studied the Daoistic magical arts transmitted in Korea since ancient times.

Tenshinkyō Shin'yūden Kyōkai
Founded by Kamiide Fusae (1922–1980) who had a sudden experience of spirit possession (kamigakari) in 1958.

Tensokokyo

It was founded in 1942 by Shimizu Shin'ichi (清水信一, 1910–1969)

Tenshō Kōtai Jingūkyō (天照皇大神宮教)
Founded by Kitamura Sayo (1900–1967).

Tenshōkyō
Founded by Senba Hideo (1925–) and his wife Senba Kimiko.

Tenshūkyō
Founded by Unagami Haruho (1896–1965).

Tokumitsukyō
Founded by Kanada Tokumitsu (1863–1919).

World Mate (ワールドメイト; formerly Cosmomate)
Founded by Fukami Seizan (a.k.a. Fukami Tōshū, born Haruhisa Handa) (1951–).

Yamakage Shintō (山蔭神道)
Emerged from "ancient Shinto" (Koshintō) tradition, founded by the Yamakage family.

Yamatokyō (大和教)
Founded by Hozumi Kenkō (1913–76), a practitioner of Shugendō at Dewa Sanzan.

Zenrinkyō (善隣教)
Founded by Rikihisa Tatsusai (1906–77).

== Other sects and schools ==
There may be some Shinto schools and sects, that even having a structure and followers, are not included in authoritative publications. This may be because of their small size and influence, fairly unknown presence or practices, or because those schools are new branches from older schools and still considered within their structure.
