= Chiyoko =

- Gender: Female

Origin
- Origin: Japanese
- Meaning: Different meanings depending on the kanji used

Chiyoko (written: 千代子) is a feminine Japanese given name. Notable people with the name include:

- Chiyoko Fukada (深田 千代子; 1887–1925)), Japanese founder of Ennōkyō
- Chiyoko Kawashima (川島 千代子; born 1954), Japanese voice actress
- Chiyoko Nakatani (中谷 千代子; 1930-1981), Japanese picture book author and illustrator
- Chiyoko Sakamoto (1912–1994), the first Japanese American female lawyer
- Chiyoko Shimakura (島倉 千代子; born 1938), Japanese singer
- Chiyoko Szlavnics (born 1967), a Canadian experimental composer

== Fictional characters ==
- Chiyoko Sonoda (園田 智代子), a character in the game The Idolmaster Shiny Colors
- Chiyoko Teruto (照門 千代子), a character in the manga Magical Trans!
- Chiyoko Wato (和登 千代子), a character in the anime and manga series Mitsume ga Tōru and a recurring character in Osamu Tezuka's Star System
- Chiyoko (fictional character), supporting character in the manga series Akira

== See also ==
- Chiyoko (camera manufacturer), a former name of the company which later became Minolta
