= Dōkai =

Japanese religion

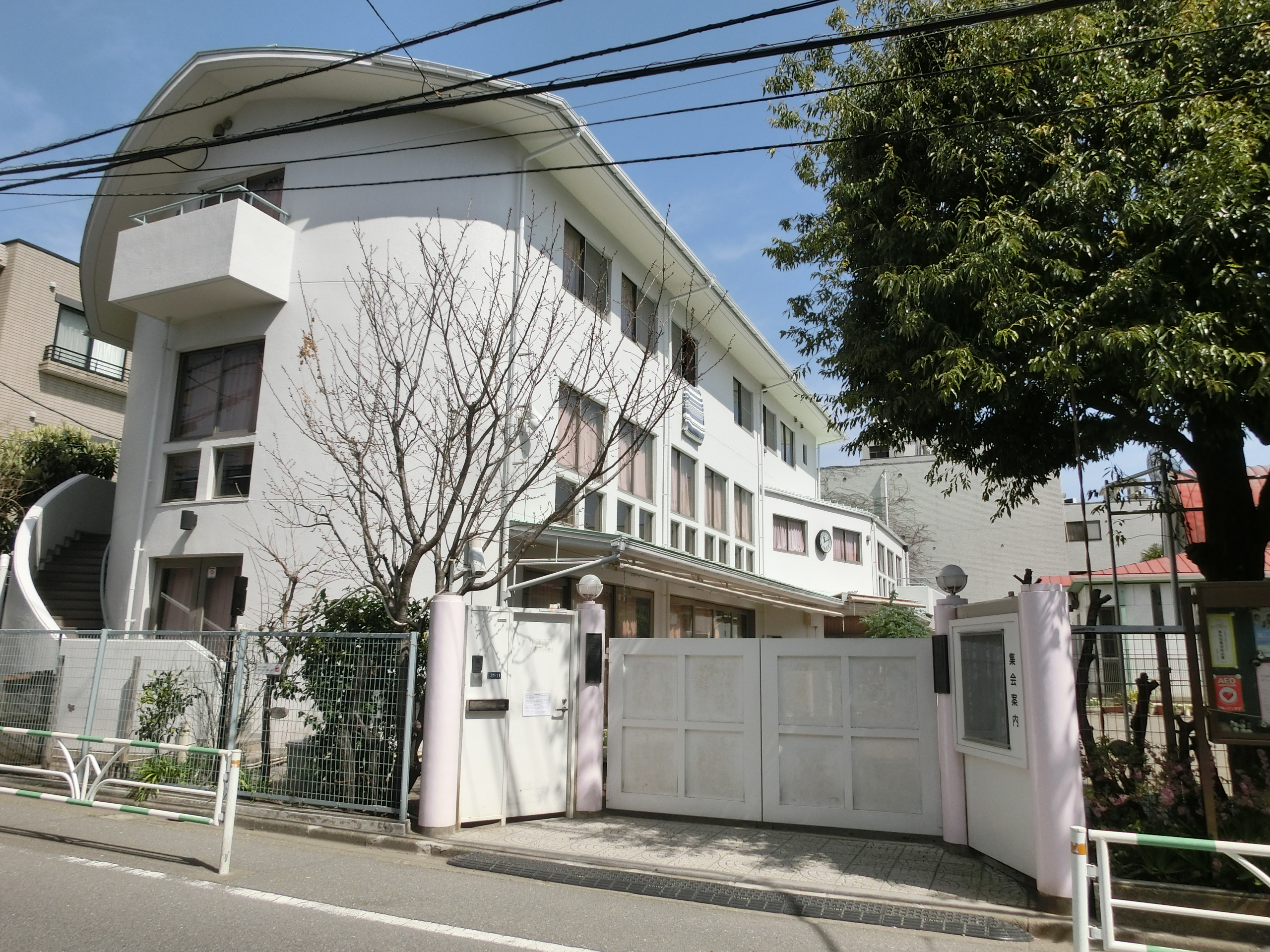
Dōkai headquarters

The Society of the Way (Japanese: 道会 (どうかい), Hepburn: Dōkai) is a Japanese new religion founded by Matsumura Kaiseki in 1907 which synthesizes aspects of Christian, Confucian, Daoist, and traditional Japanese thought. Its four main tenets are theism (信神), ethical cultivation (修徳), neighborly love (愛隣), and a belief in eternal life (永生).

== Notable members ==
- Ōkawa Shūmei, Japanese nationalist and Pan-Asian ideologue

== See also ==
- Tensokokyo, a Japanese new religion that also utilizes the teachings of Christianity
