= Matsumura Kaiseki =

Japanese religious leader (1859–1939)

Matsumura Kaiseki (松村介石; 1859 – 1939) was the founder of Dokai, the Way, a Pan-Asianist Christian-influenced new religious movement.
