= Honmon Butsuryū-shū =

Sect of Nichiren Buddhism

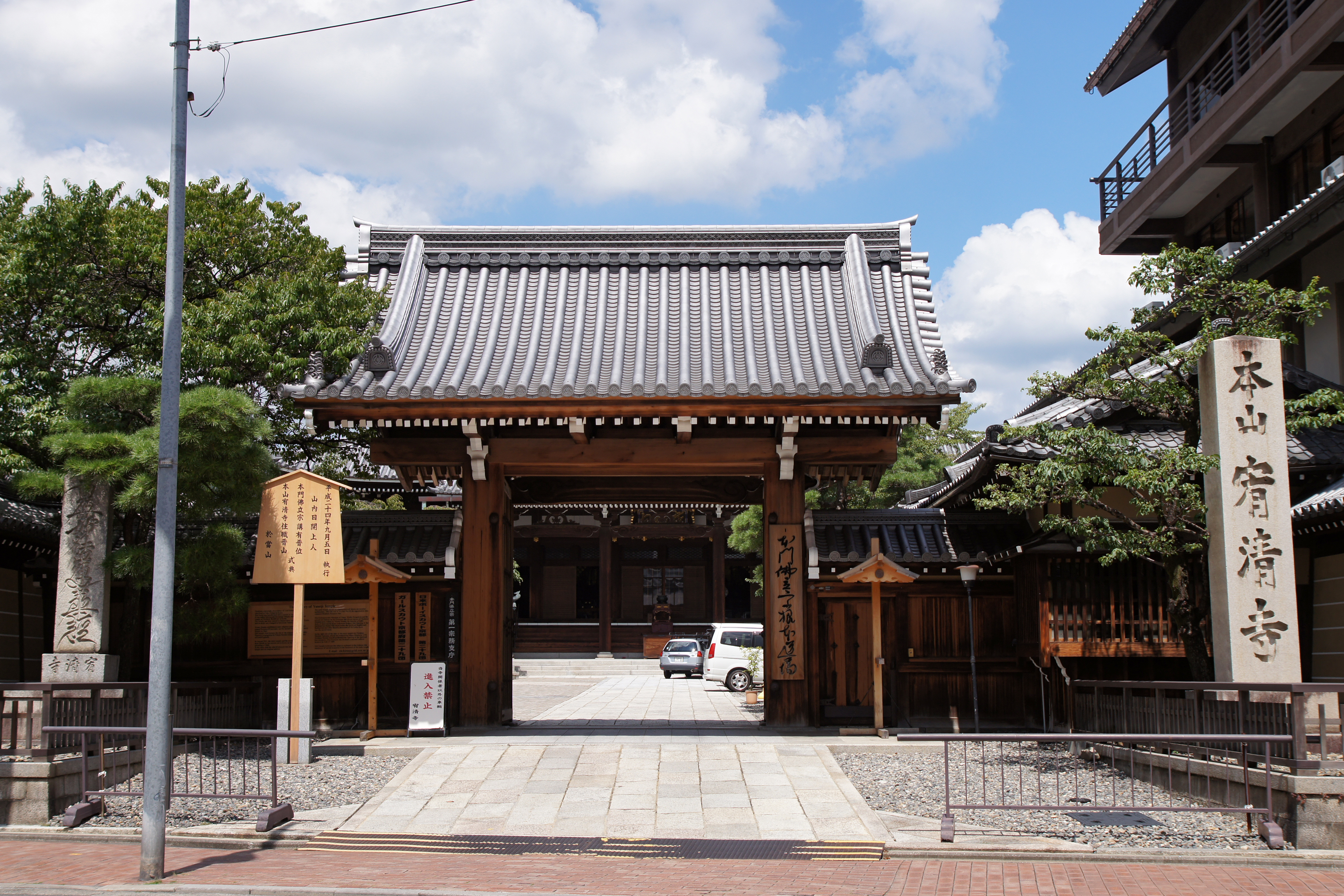
Entrance to Yusei-ji in Kyoto

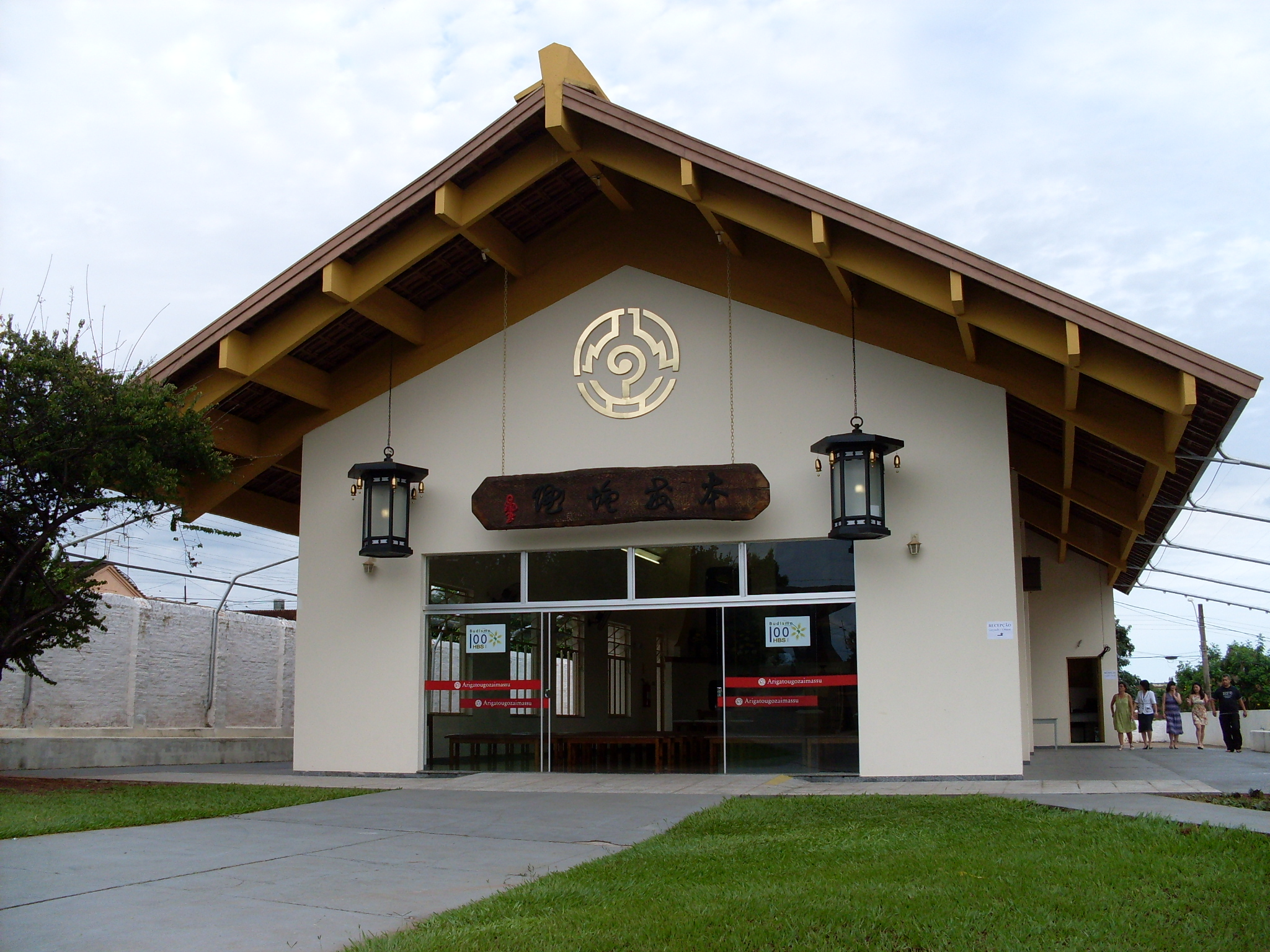
Temple of Honmon Butsuryū-shū (Taissen-ji) in Brazil

The Honmon Butsuryū-shū (本門佛立宗) is a branch of the Honmon Hokke Shū sect (one of the most ancient sects of Nichiren Buddhism). It was founded by Nagamatsu Nissen (長松 日扇; 1817–1890) and a group of followers the 12th of January 1857 with the name of Honmon Butsuryu Ko. This group was affiliated with Honmon Hokke shu sect until the 15th of March 1947 when it became independent with the name of Honmon Butsuryū-shū. In fact, they shared the same Patriarch until 1947. The last common patriarch was Nichijun Shonin.

HBS is part of the Japan Buddhist Federation and of the World Fellowship of Buddhists as a traditional Nichiren school. Initially it was regarded as one of Japan’s new religious movements, but recent studies show that HBS is not a new religious movement but a traditional Nichiren school.

Honmon Butsuryū-shū members practice in the tradition of Nichiren’s disciple Daikoku Ajari Nichiro (1245-1320) and consider Keirin-bo Nichiryu Daishonin (慶林坊日隆, 1385-1464) to be the second greatest leader of their school. Nichiryu Daishonin played an active role in reviving Nichiren Buddhism by transcribing many of Nichiren Shonin’s manuscripts and concluding that his teaching were fundamentally based in the "Honmon" (8 chapters) of the Lotus Sutra.

The head temple of Honmon Butsuryū-shū is the Yūsei-ji located in Kyoto. Even though the majority of its believers are in Japan, there are several congregations and Temples across the world such as in North America, Brazil, Italy, United Kingdom, Taiwan, South Korea, and even Nepal.

== See also ==
- Mahayana
