= Japanese new religions =

New religious movements founded in Japan since mid-19th century

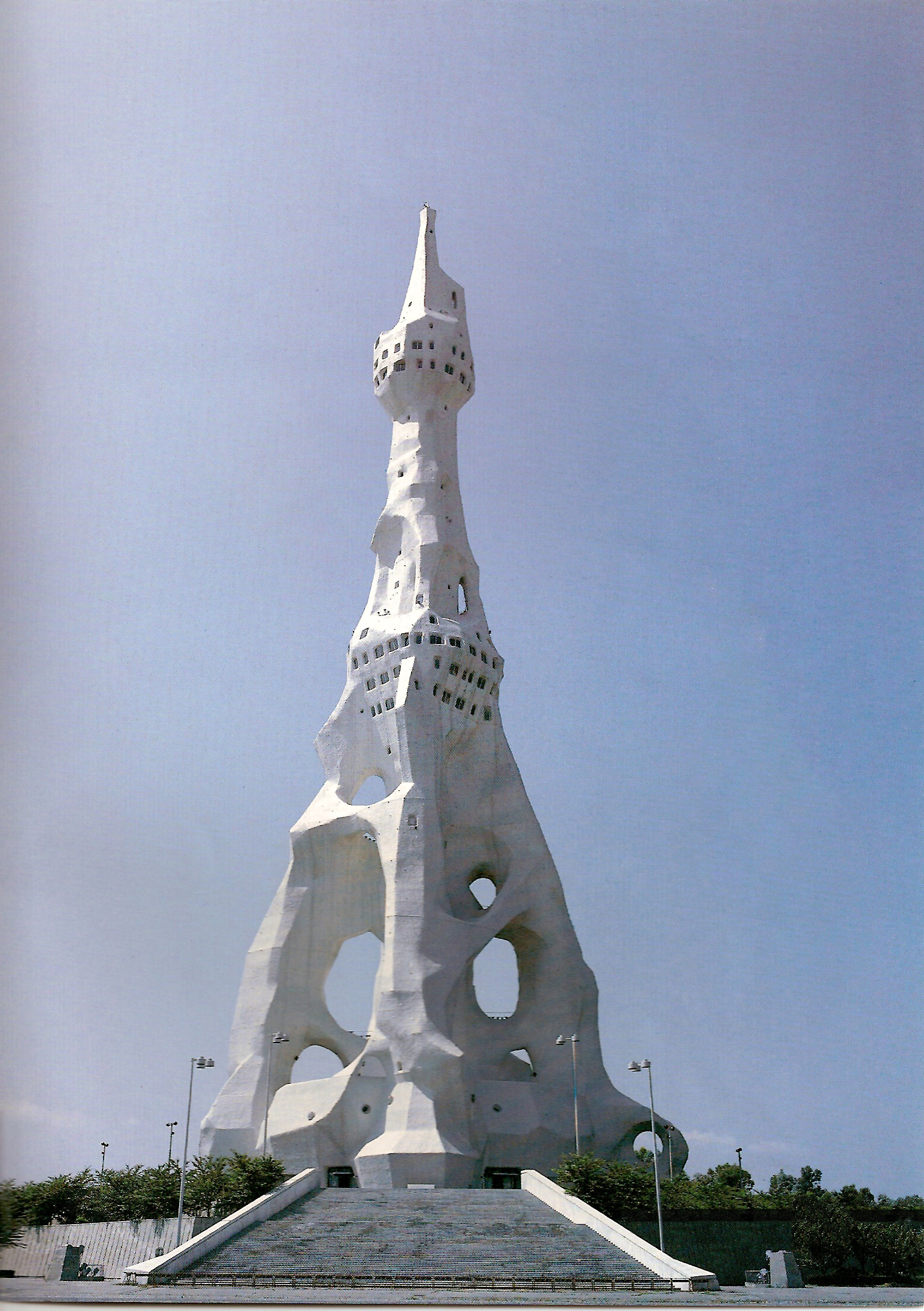
The Dai Heiwa Kinen Tō, Peace Tower built by Perfect Liberty Kyōdan

Japanese new religions are new religious movements established in Japan. In Japanese, they are called shinshūkyō (新宗教) or shinkō shūkyō (新興宗教). Japanese scholars classify all religious organizations founded since the middle of the 19th century as "new religions"; thus, the term refers to a great diversity and number of organizations. Most came into being in the mid-to-late twentieth century and are influenced by much older traditional religions including Buddhism and Shinto. Foreign influences include Islam and Christianity, the Bible, and the writings of Nostradamus.

== Before World War II ==
In the 1860s, Japan began to experience great social turmoil and rapid modernization. As social conflicts emerged in this last decade of the Edo period, known as the Bakumatsu period, some new religious movements appeared. Among them were Tenrikyo, Kurozumikyo, and Oomoto, sometimes called Nihon Sandai Shinkōshūkyō ('Japan's three large new religions') or "old new religions", which were directly influenced by Shinto (the state religion) and shamanism.

The social tension continued to grow during the Meiji period, affecting religious practices and institutions. Conversion from traditional faith was no longer legally forbidden, officials lifted the 250-year ban on Christianity, and missionaries of established Christian churches reentered Japan. The traditional syncreticism between Shinto and Buddhism ended and Shinto became the national religion. Losing the protection of the Japanese government which Buddhism had enjoyed for centuries, Buddhist monks faced radical difficulties in sustaining their institutions, but their activities also became less restrained by governmental policies and restrictions.

The Japanese government was very suspicious towards these religious movements and periodically made attempts to suppress them. Government suppression was especially severe during the early 20th century, particularly from the 1930s until the early 1940s, when the growth of Japanese nationalism and State Shinto were closely linked. Under the Meiji regime lèse-majesté prohibited insults against the Emperor and his Imperial House, and also against some major Shinto shrines which were believed to be tied strongly to the Emperor. The government strengthened its control over religious institutions that were considered to undermine State Shinto or nationalism, arresting some members and leaders of Shinshūkyō, including Onisaburo Deguchi of Oomoto and Tsunesaburō Makiguchi of Soka Kyoiku Gakkai (now Soka Gakkai), who typically were charged with violation of lèse-majesté and the Peace Preservation Law.

== After World War II ==
=== Background ===
After Japan was defeated in World War II, its government and policy changed radically during occupation by Allied troops. The official status of State Shinto was abolished, and Shinto shrines became religious organizations, losing government protection and financial support. Although the Occupation Army (GHQ) practiced censorship of all types of organizations, specific suppression of Shinshūkyō ended.

GHQ invited many Christian missionaries from the United States to Japan, through Douglas MacArthur's famous call for 1,000 missionaries. Missionaries arrived not only from traditional churches, but also from some modern denominations, such as Jehovah's Witnesses. The Jehovah's Witnesses missionaries were so successful that they have become the second largest Christian denomination in Japan, with over 210,000 members (the largest is Catholicism with about 500,000 members). In Japan, Jehovah's Witnesses tend to be considered a Christianity-based Shinshūkyō, not only because they were founded in the 19th century (as were other major Shinshūkyō), but also because of their missionary practices, which involve door-to-door visiting and frequent meetings.

Despite the influx of Christian missionaries, the majority of Shinshūkyō are Buddhist- or Shinto-related sects. Major sects include Risshō Kōsei Kai and Shinnyo-en. Major goals of Shinshūkyō include spiritual healing, individual prosperity, and social harmony. Many also hold a belief in Apocalypticism, that is in the imminent end of the world or at least its radical transformation. Most of those who joined Shinshūkyō in this period were women from lower-middle-class backgrounds.

A few Shinto-based Shinshūkyō, such as Tenrikyo and Konkokyo, refer to themselves in English as churches rather than as temples or shrines. In both Tenrikyo and Konkokyo, some branches abroad are known as missions.

Soka Gakkai has a particular influence on politics since 1964, due to their affiliated party Komeito, later New Komeito. In 1999, it was estimated that 10 to 20 per cent of the Japanese population were members of a Shinshūkyō.

=== Influence ===
After World War II, the structure of the state was changed radically. Prior to WWII, the National Diet was restricted and the real power lay with the executive branch, in which the prime minister was appointed by the emperor. Under the new Constitution of Japan, the Diet had the supreme authority for decision making in state affairs and all its members were elected by the people. Especially in the House of Councillors, one third of whose members were elected through nationwide vote, nationwide organizations found they could influence national policy by supporting certain candidates. Major Shinshūkyō became one of the so-called "vote-gathering machines" in Japan, especially for the conservative parties which merged into the Liberal Democratic Party in 1955.

== Other nations ==
In the 1950s, Japanese wives of American servicemen introduced the Soka Gakkai to the United States, which in the 1970s developed into the Soka Gakkai International (SGI). Well-known American SGI converts include musician Herbie Hancock and singer Tina Turner.

In Brazil Shinshūkyō, like Honmon Butsuryū-shū, were first introduced in the 1920s among the Japanese immigrant population. In the 1950s and 1960s some started to become popular among the non-Japanese population as well. Seicho-No-Ie now has the largest membership in the country. In the 1960s, it adopted Portuguese, rather than Japanese, as its language of instruction and communication. It also began to advertise itself as philosophy rather than religion in order to avoid conflict with the Roman Catholic Church and other socially conservative elements in society. By 1988 it had more than 2.4 million members in Brazil, 85% of them not of Japanese ethnicity.

Today, the largest Japanese new religions in Brazil and the United States include Seicho-No-Ie, PL Kyodan, the Church of World Messianity, Sukyo Mahikari, Soka Gakkai, Reiyukai, Tenrikyo, and Konkokyo.

== Statistics ==
Edifices and emblems of various Japanese new religions

Emblem of Tenri-kyō

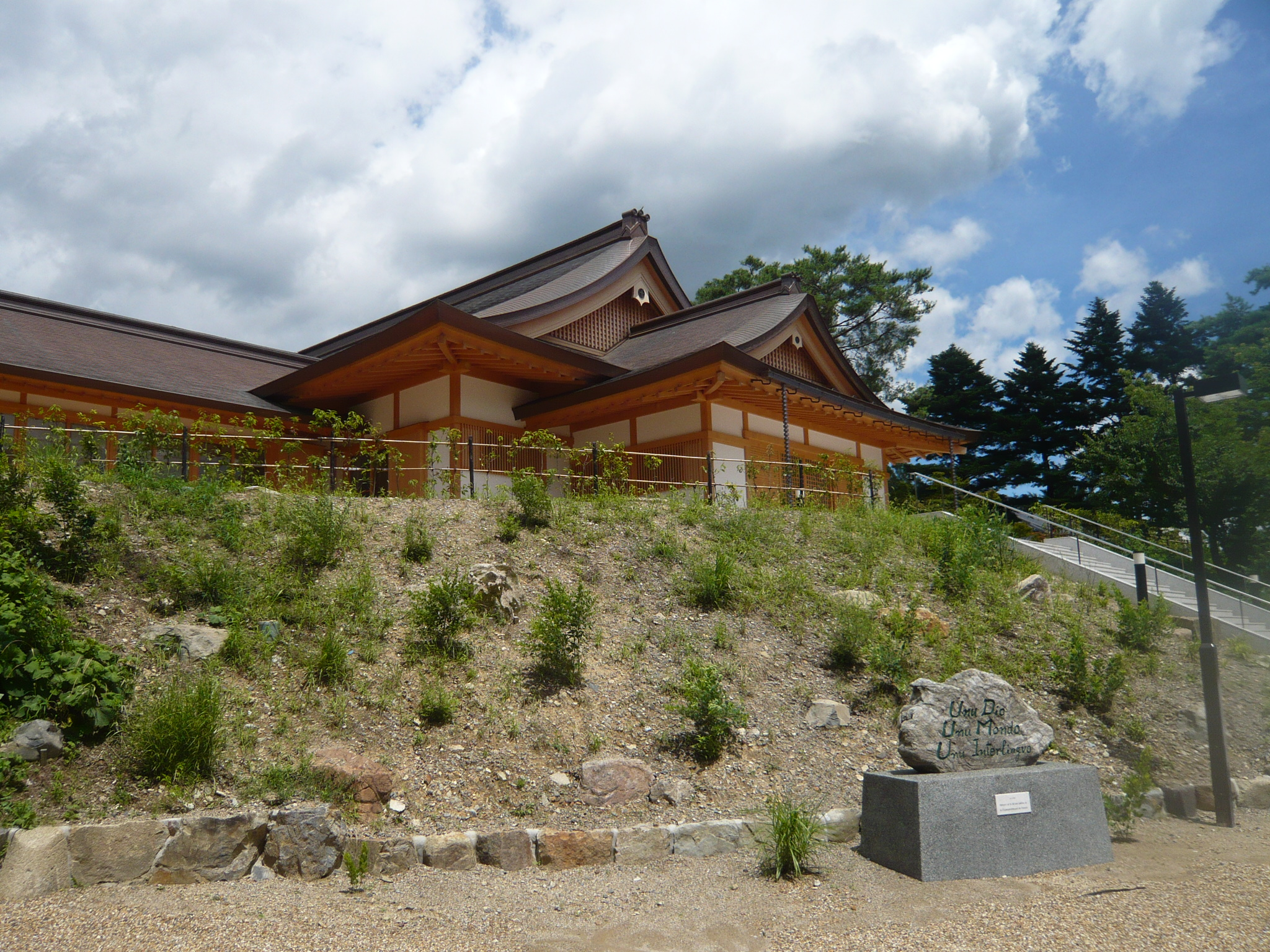
Head office of Oomoto at Kameoka, Japan

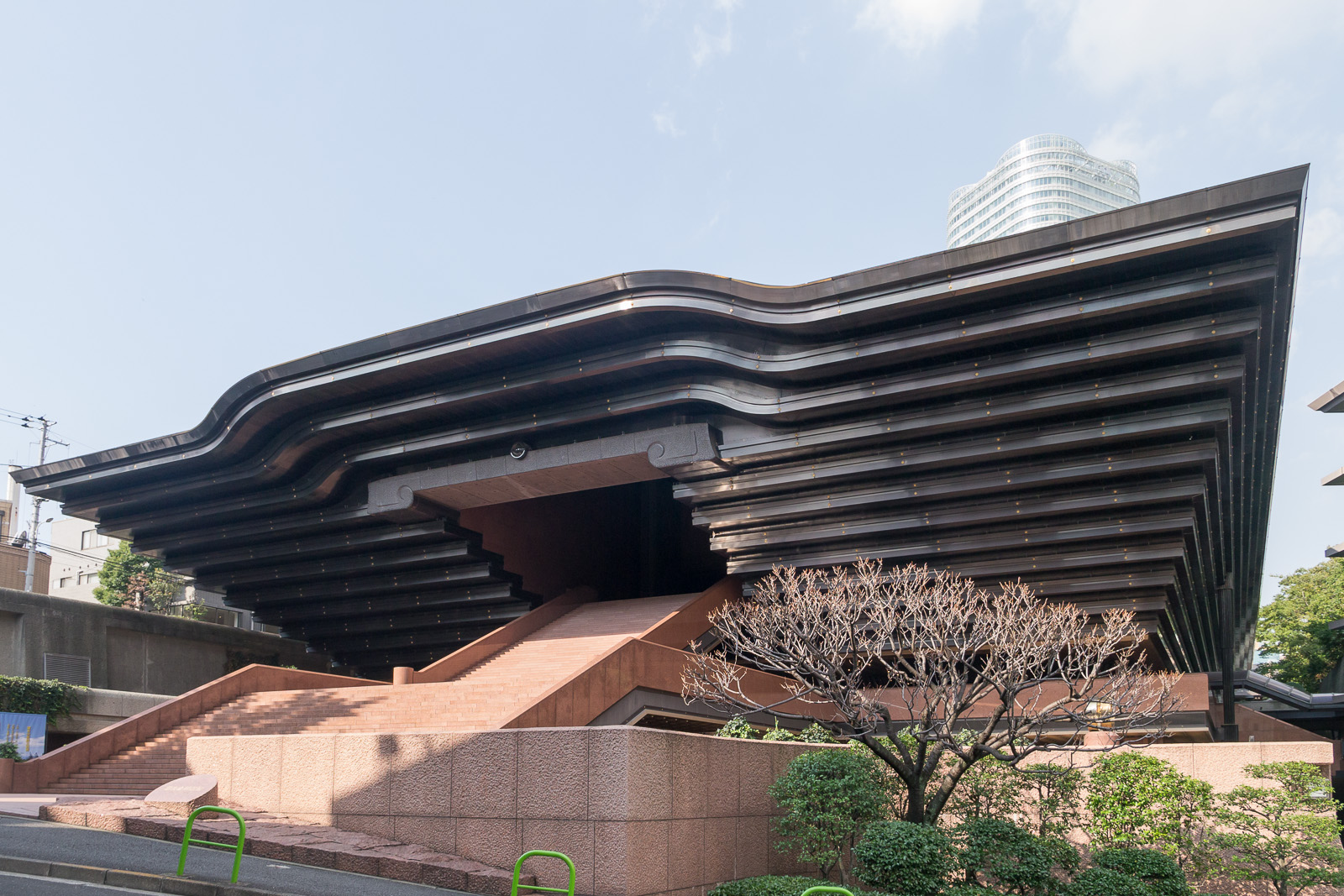
Headquarters of Reiyū-kai

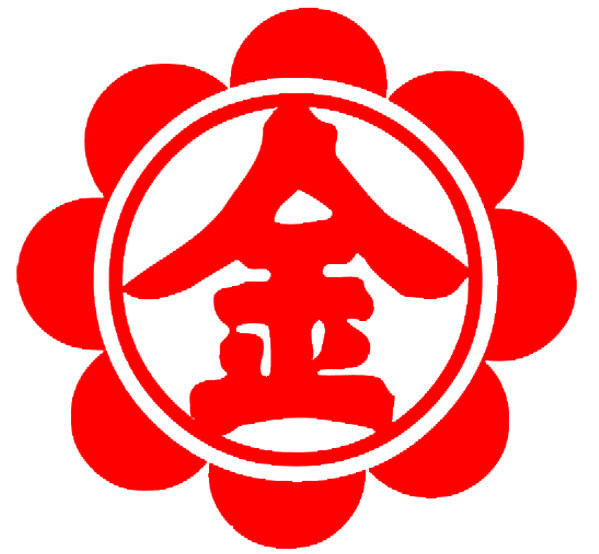
Emblem of Konko-kyō

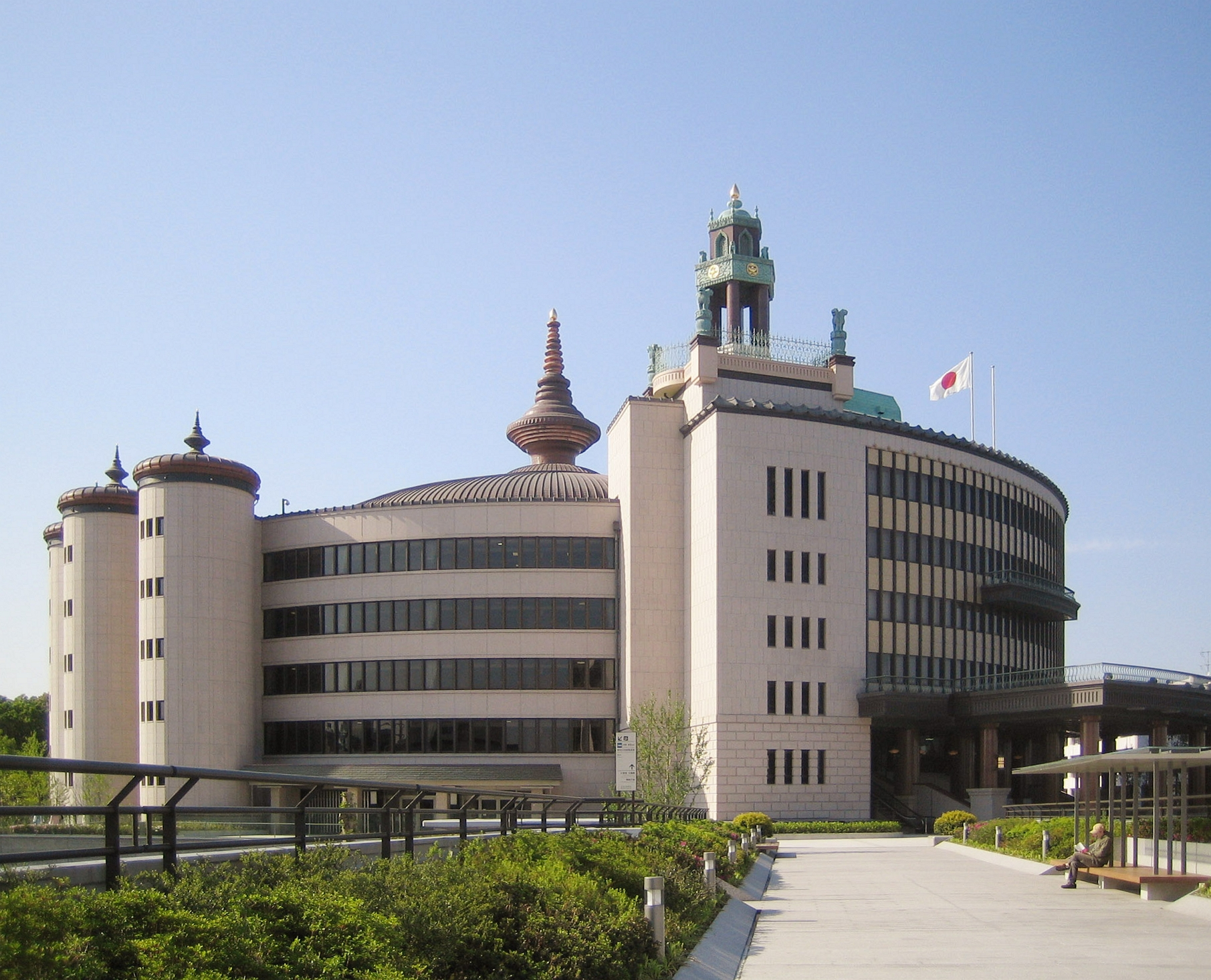
Rissho Kosei-kai’s Great Sacred Hall

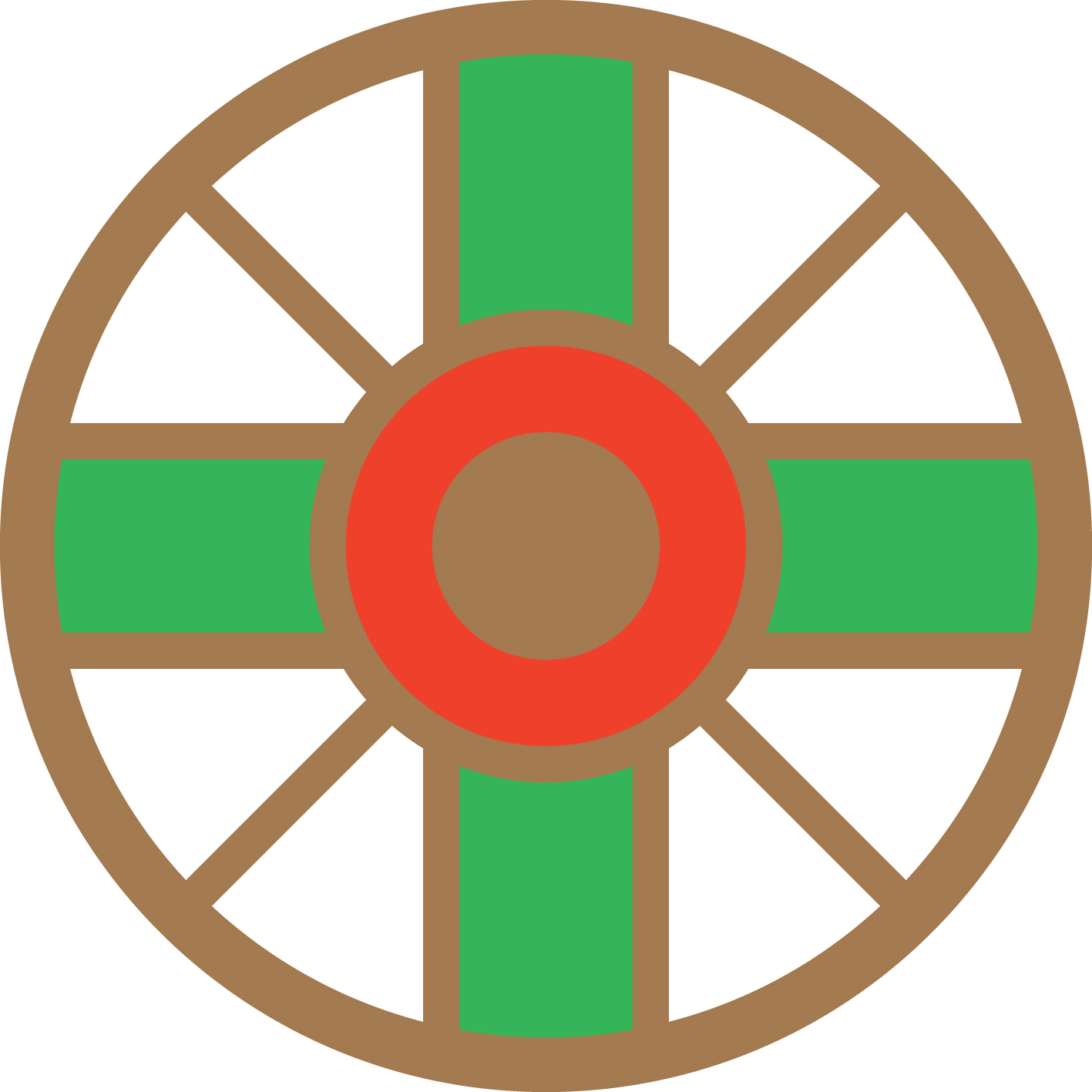
Emblem of Church of World Messianity (Sekai Kyūsei Kyō)

| Name | Founder | Founded | 1954 | 1974 | 1990 | 2012 |
|---|---|---|---|---|---|---|
| Nyorai-kyō (如来教) | Isson-nyorai Kino (1756–1826) | 1802 | 75,480 | 33,674 | 27,131 | 7,477 |
| Kurozumi-kyō (黒住教) | Munetada Kurozumi (1780–1850) | 1814 | 715,650 | 407,558 | 295,225 | 297,767 |
| Tenri-kyō (天理教) | Nakayama Miki (1798–1887) | 1838 | 1,912,208 | 2,298,420 | 1,839,009 | 1,199,652 |
| Honmon Butsuryū-shū (本門佛立宗) | Nagamatsu Nissen (1817–1890) | 1857 | 339,800 | 515,911 | 526,337 | 345,288 |
| Konko-kyō (金光教) | Konkō Daijin (1814–1883) | 1859 | 646,206 | 500,868 | 442,584 | 430,021 |
| Maruyama-kyō (丸山教) | Rokurōbei Itō (1829–1894) | 1870 | 92,011 | 3,200 | 10,725 | 11,057 |
| Oomoto (大本) | Nao Deguchi (1837–1918); Onisaburō Deguchi (1871–1948) | 1899 | 73,604 | 153,397 | 172,460 | 169,525 |
| Nakayama-Shingoshō-shū (中山身語正宗) | Matsutarō Kihara (1870–1942) | 1912 | 282,650 | 467,910 | 382,040 | 295,275 |
| Honmichi (ほんみち) | Ōnishi Aijirō (1881–1958) | 1913 | 225,386 | 288,700 | 316,825 | 318,974 |
| En'ō-kyō (円応教) | Chiyoko Fukada (1887–1925) | 1919 | 71,654 | 266,782 | 419,452 | 457,346 |
| Reiyū-kai (霊友会) | Kakutarō Kubo (1892–1944) | 1924 | 2,284,172 | 2,477,907 | 3,202,172 | 1,412,975 |
| Nenpō-shinkyō (念法眞教) | Ogura Reigen (1886–1982) | 1925 | 153,846 | 751,214 | 807,486 | 408,755 |
| Perfect Liberty Kyōdan (パーフェクト リバティー教団) | Miki Tokuharu (1871–1938); Miki Tokuchika (1900–1983) | (1925); 1946 | 500,950 | 2,520,430 | 1,259,064 | 942,967 |
| Seichō-no-Ie (生長の家) | Masaharu Taniguchi (1893–1985) | 1930 | 1,461,604 | 2,375,705 | 838,496 | 618,629 |
| Sōka Gakkai (創価学会) | Tsunesaburō Makiguchi (1871–1944); Jōsei Toda (1900–1958) | 1930 | 341,146 | 10,000,000 (claimed) | 12,000,000 (claimed) / 2 to 4,000,000 (scholars) | 12,000,000 (claimed) / 2 to 4,000,000 (scholars) |
| Sekai Kyūsei-kyō (世界救世教) | Mokichi Okada (1882–1955) | 1935 | 373,173 | 661,263 | 835,756 | 835,756 |
| Shinnyo-en (真如苑) | Shinjō Itō (1906–1956) | 1936 | 155,500 | 296,514 | 679,414 | 902,254 |
| Kōdō Kyōdan (孝道教団) | Shōdō Okano (1900–1978) | 1936 | 172,671 | 417,638 | 400,720 | 184,859 |
| Risshō Kōsei-kai (立正佼成会) | Myōkō Naganuma (1889–1957); Nikkyō Niwano (1906–1999) | 1938 | 1,041,124 | 4,562,304 | 6,348,120 | 3,232,411 |
| Tenshō Kōtai Jingū-kyō (天照皇大神宮教) | Sayo Kitamura (1900–1967) | 1945 | 89,374 | 386,062 | 439,011 | 479,707 |
| Zenrin-kyō (善隣教) | Tatsusai Rikihisa (1906–1977) | 1947 | 404,157 | 483,239 | 513,321 | 132,286 |
| Ōyamanezunomikoto Shinji Kyōkai (大山ねずの命神示教会) | Sadao Inaii (1906–1988) | 1948 | | 59,493 | 826,022 | |
| Bussho Gonenkai Kyōdan (佛所護念会教団) | Kaichi Sekiguchi (1897–1961); Sekiguchi Tomino (1905–1990) | 1950 | 352,170 | 1,210,227 | 2,196,813 | 1,277,424 |
| Myōchikai Kyōdan (妙智会教団) | Mitsu Miyamoto (1900–1984) | 1950 | 515,122 | 673,913 | 962,611 | 709,849 |
| Byakkō Shinkō-kai (白光真宏会) | Masahisa Goi (1916–1980) | 1951 | | | 500,000 | |
| Agon-shū (阿含宗) | Seiyū Kiriyama (1921–2016) | 1954 | | 500 | 206,606 | 353,890 |
| Reiha-no-Hikari Kyōkai (霊波之光) | Hase Yoshio (1915–1984) | 1954 | | | 761,175 | |
| Jōdo Shinshū Shinran-kai (浄土真宗親鸞会) | Kentetsu Takamori (1934–) | 1958 | | | 100,000 | |
| Sekai Mahikari Bunmei Kyōdan (世界真光文明教団) | Kōtama Okada (Yoshikazu Okada) (1901–1974) | 1959 | | | 97,838 | |
| Honbushin (ほんぶしん) | Ōnishi Tama (1916–1969) | 1961 | | | 900,000 | |
| God Light Association Sōgō Honbu (GLA総合本部) | Shinji Takahashi (1927–1976) | 1969 | | | 12,981 | |
| Shinji Shūmei-kai (神慈秀明会) | Mihoko Koyama (1910–2003) | 1970 | | | 1988: 440,000 | |
| Nihon Seidō Kyōdan (日本聖道教団) | Shōkō Iwasaki (1934–) | 1974 | | | 69,450 | |
| Extra-Sensory-Perception Kagaku Kenkyūjo (ESP科学研究所) | Katao Ishii (1918–1993) | 1975 | | | 16,000 | |
| Sūkyō Mahikari (崇教真光) | Yoshikazu Okada (1901–1974) | 1978 | | | 501,328 | |
| Ho No Hana (法の華三法行) | Hōgen Fukunaga (1945–) | 1980 | | | 70,000 | |
| Yamato-no-Miya (大和之宮) | Tenkei Ajiki (1952–) | 1981 | | | 5,000 | |
| World Mate (ワールドメイト) | Seizan Fukami (1951–) | 1984 | | | 30,000 | 72,000 |
| Happy Science (幸福の科学) | Ryūhō Ōkawa (1956–2023) | 1986 | | | 1989: 13,300; 1991: 1,527,278 | 1,100,000 |
| Aum Shinrikyo (オウム真理教) | Shōkō Asahara (1955–2018) | 1987 (−2000) | | | 2005: 1,650 | 2018: 1,950 |

Data for 2012 is from the Agency for Cultural Affairs.

== List of scriptures ==
Below is a list of scriptures in various Japanese new religions, most of which are considered to be direct divine revelations in their respective religions.

- Konkokyo: Konkōkyō Kyōten (金光教教典)
- Tenrikyo: Mikagura-uta (御神楽歌), Ofudesaki (御筆先), Osashizu (御指図)
- Honmichi: Kyōgi Ichiban (教義一斑)
- Honbushin: Tenkei Mikyōsho (天啓御教書)
- Oomoto: Oomoto Shin'yu (大本神諭), Reikai Monogatari (霊界物語), Michi no Shiori (道の栞), Michi no Hikari (道の光)
- Seicho-No-Ie: 4 sutras (Kanro no Hōu 甘露の法雨, Tenshi no Kotoba 天使の言葉, Zoku-zoku Kanro no Hōu 続々甘露の法雨, Seishimei Bosatsu Sange 聖使命菩薩讃偈) and Seimei no jissō (生命の實相, 40 volumes)
- Ananaikyo: Reikai-de Mita Uchū (霊界で観た宇宙, about 12 volumes)
- Tenshō Kōtai Jingūkyō: Seisho (生書, 4 volumes)
- Shintō Tenkōkyo: Tomokiyo Yoshisane zenshū (友清歓真全集, 6 volumes)
- Ōyamanezunomikoto Shinji Kyōkai: Shinjitsu no hikari: shinji (真実の光・神示)
- Makoto no Michi: Makoto no Michi shinji (真の道神示, 2 volumes)
- Ennokyo: Ennōkyō Kyōten (円応教教典)
- Tensokokyo: Voice of the Sphinx (スフィンクスの声)

== Sacred mountains ==
Sacred mountains in Japanese new religions include the following.

- In Honbushin: Mount Kami or Kami-yama (神山) in Okayama
- In Kurozumikyō: Mount Shintō or Shintō-zan (神道山) in Okayama
- In Oomoto: Mount Takakuma or Takakuma-yama (高熊山) in Kameoka and Mount Hongū (本宮山) in Ayabe. Mount Hongū is considered to be a shintaizan (神体山; shintai mountain).
- In Shintō Tenkōkyo: Mount Iwaki or Iwaki-yama (石城山) in Yamaguchi Prefecture
- In Sukyo Mahikari: Mount Kurai. The Inner Shrine (Okumiya) of the World Shrine (世界総本山奥宮) is located on its summit. A memorial complex dedicated to the religion's founders is located near the mountain's base.
- In Seicho-No-Ie: Sōhonzan (生長の家総本山), the hill where Seicho-No-Ie's spiritual headquarters is located in Saikai, Nagasaki

== See also ==
- Chinese new religions
- Buddhism in Japan
- Buddhist modernism
- New religious movements
- Religion in Japan
- Shinto sects and schools (only some in the list count as Shinshūkyō)
- Shūkyō nisei

== Bibliography ==
- Clarke, Peter B. (1999) A Bibliography of Japanese New Religious Movements: With Annotations. Richmond, Vi: Curzon. ISBN 9781873410806. OCLC 246578574.
- Clarke, Peter B. (2000). Japanese New Religions: In Global Perspective. Richmond, Vi: Curzon. ISBN 9780700711857. OCLC 442441364.
- Clarke, Peter B., Somers, Jeffrey, editors (1994). Japanese New Religions in the West. Kent, UK: Japan Library/Curzon Press. ISBN 1-873410-24-7.
- Dormann, Benjamin (2012). Celebrity Gods: New Religions, Media, and Authority in Occupied Japan. Honolulu: University of Hawaiʻi Press. ISBN 0824836219.
- Dormann, Benjamin (2005). “New Religions through the Eyes of Ōya Sōichi, 'Emperor' of the Mass Media”, in: Bulletin of the Nanzan Institute for Religion & Culture, 29, pp. 54–67.
- Dormann, Benjamin (2004). “SCAP's Scapegoat? The Authorities, New Religions, and a Postwar Taboo”, in: Japanese Journal of Religious Studies 31/1: pp. 105–140.
- Ellwood, Robert S., Jr. (1974). The Eagle and the Rising Sun: Americans and the New Religions of Japan. Philadelphia: Westminster Press.
- Ellwood, Robert S. (2008). Introducing Japanese Religion. World Religions Series. London; New York: Routledge. ISBN 978-0-4157-7425-3.
- Ellwood, Robert S.; Shimazono, Susumu (2005) [1987]. "New Religious Movements: New Religious Movements in Japan". In Lindsay Jones (ed.). Encyclopedia of Religion: 15-volume Set. Vol. 10 (2nd ed.). Farmington Hills, Mi: Macmillan Reference USA – via Encyclopedia.com.
- Hardacre, Helen. (1988). Kurozumikyo and the New Religions of Japan. Princeton, NJ: Princeton University Press. ISBN 0-691-02048-5.
- Hardacre, Helen (1993). "The New Religions, Family, and Society in Japan". In Marty, Martin E.; Appleby, R. Scott (eds.). Fundamentalisms and Society: Reclaiming the Sciences, the Family, and Education. The Fundamentalism Project, 2. Chicago, Il; London: University of Chicago Press. pp. 294–310. ISBN 0-226-50880-3.
- Kisala, Robert (2001). “Images of God in Japanese New Religions”, in: Bulletin of the Nanzan Institute for Religion & Culture, 25, pp. 19–32.
- Shimazono, Susumu (2004). From Salvation to Spirituality: Popular Religious Movements in Modern Japan. Japanese Society Series. Melbourne, Vic.: Trans Pacific Press. ISBN 978-1-8768-4312-0.
- Staemmler, Birgit & Ulrich Dehn, eds. Establishing the Revolutionary: An Introduction to New Religions in Japan. Munster: LIT, 2011. ISBN 978-3-643-90152-1.
- Thomsen, Harry. The New Religions of Japan. Tokyo–Rutland, Vt.: Charles E. Tuttle, 1963.
- Wilson, Bryan R. and Karel Dobbelaere. (1994). A Time to Chant. Oxford: Oxford University Press. ISBN 0-19-827915-9.
