= Ōyamanezunomikoto Shinji Kyōkai =

Japanese new religion based in Yokohama

- 大山ねずの命神示教会
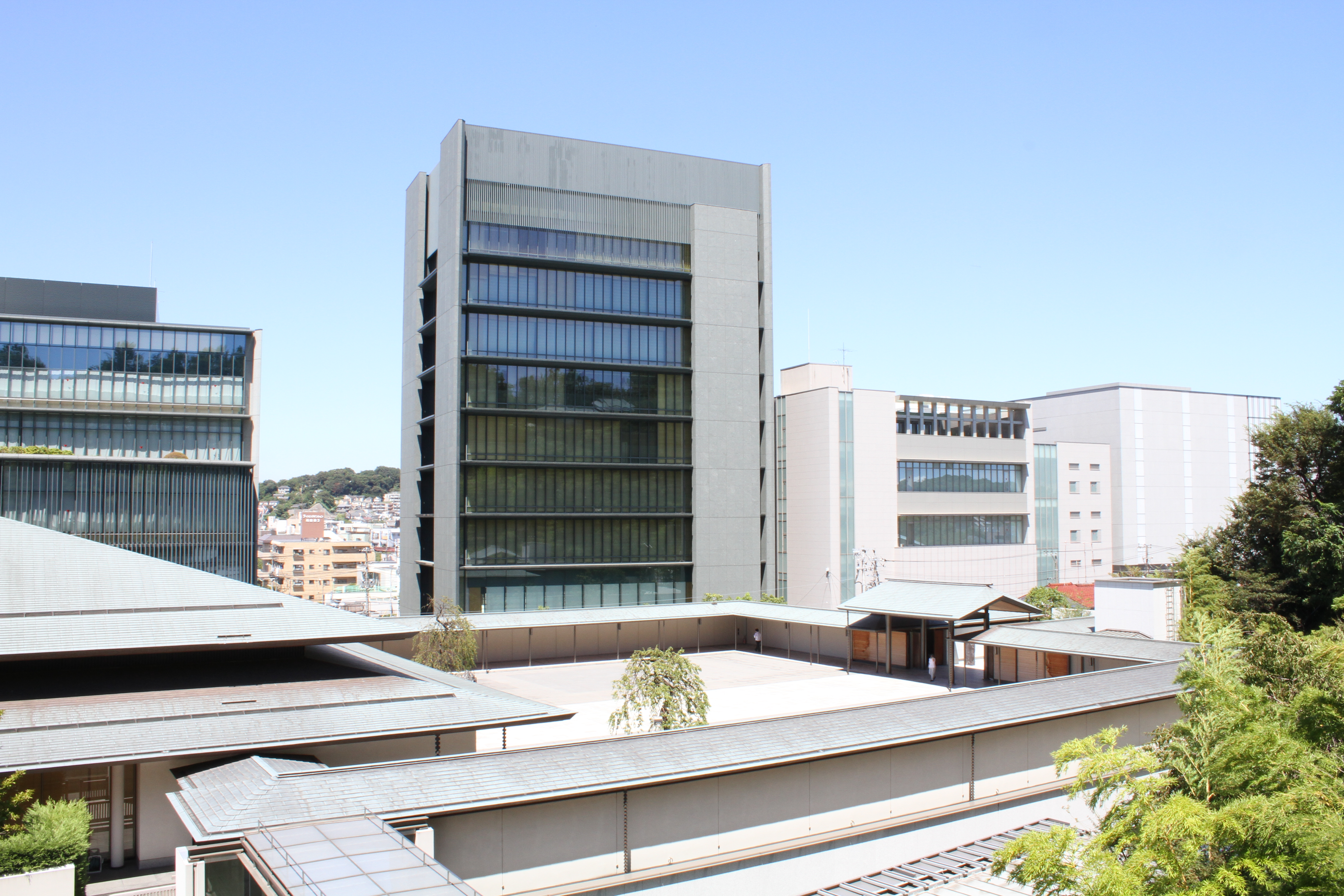
- Ōyamanezunomikoto Shinji Kyōkai headquarters in Yokohama, Japan
- Type: Shinto-based Japanese new religion
- Scripture: Shinjitsu no hikari: shinji (真実の光・神示)
- Language: Japanese
- Headquarters: Minami-ku, Yokohama, Japan
- Founder: Tomomaru Sai (供丸斎)
- Origin: September 23, 1953
- Official website: shinjikyoukai.jp
- Slogan: Kami, Hotoke, Hito no Michi (神、仏、人の道)

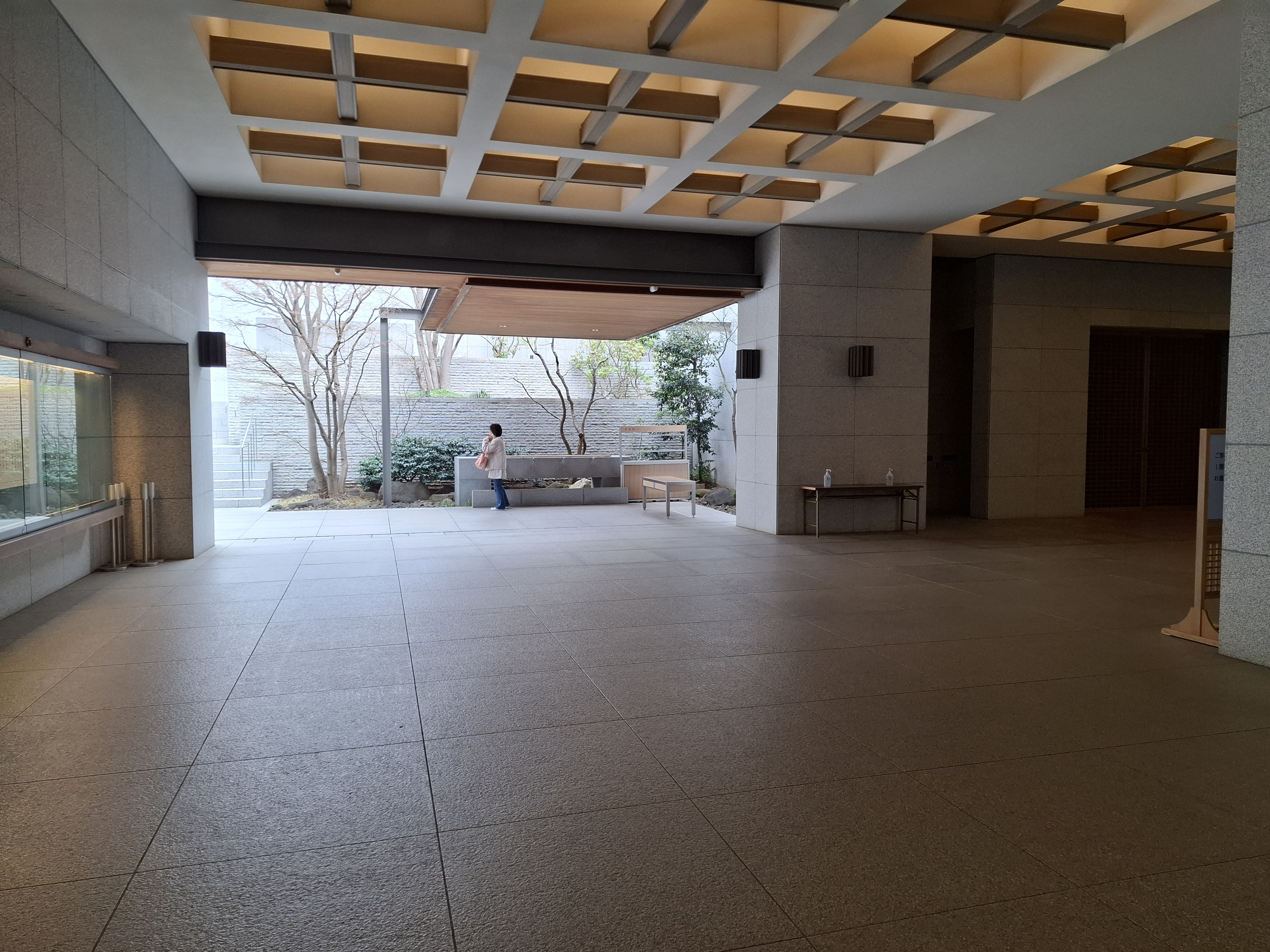
Front atrium of Ōyamanezunomikoto Shinji Kyōkai main worship area

Ōyamanezunomikoto Shinji Kyōkai (大山ねずの命神示教会), also known simply as Shinji Kyōkai (神示教会), is a Shinto-based Japanese new religion. The headquarters of Ōyamanezunomikoto Shinji Kyōkai is located near Maita Station in Minami-ku, Yokohama, Japan.

== Name of the organization ==
The name of the organization can be analyzed as follows.

- Ōyamanezu-no-mikoto (大山ねずの命) (name of the religion's main deity)
- Shinji (神示), lit. 'divine revelation'
- Kyōkai (教会), lit. 'religious organization or church'

The official name of the religion written in kanji is given in the image below. The third character from the left (resembling 祇 but without the horizontal stroke in the middle right) is not encoded and thus has to be displayed using an image. As a result, the hiragana ねずの (nezu-no) is usually typed instead.

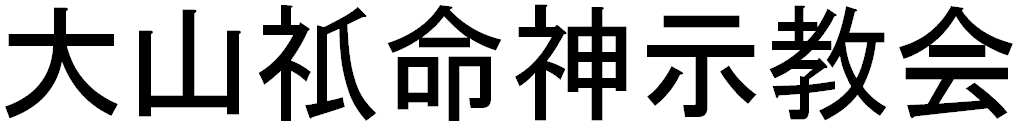

== Beliefs and doctrines ==
The religion's official doctrine is "The Way of God, Buddha, and Man" (神、仏、人の道, Kami, Hotoke, Hito no Michi). The deity worshipped is the goddess Ōyamanezu-no-mikoto (大山ねずの命).

== History ==
Ōyamanezunomikoto Shinji Kyōkai was founded on September 23, 1953 by Tomomaru Sai (供丸斎; born Inahime Sadao 稲飯 定雄; 1905–1988).

The religion believes that Mori Hideko (森 日出子; November 15, 1946 – 2002), known in the religion as Tomomaruhime Sensei 供丸姫先生, is the divine incarnation of Ōyamanezu-no-mikoto. She was announced to be a kami on November 15, 1987, which is also the starting date of the religion's calendar.

== Publications ==
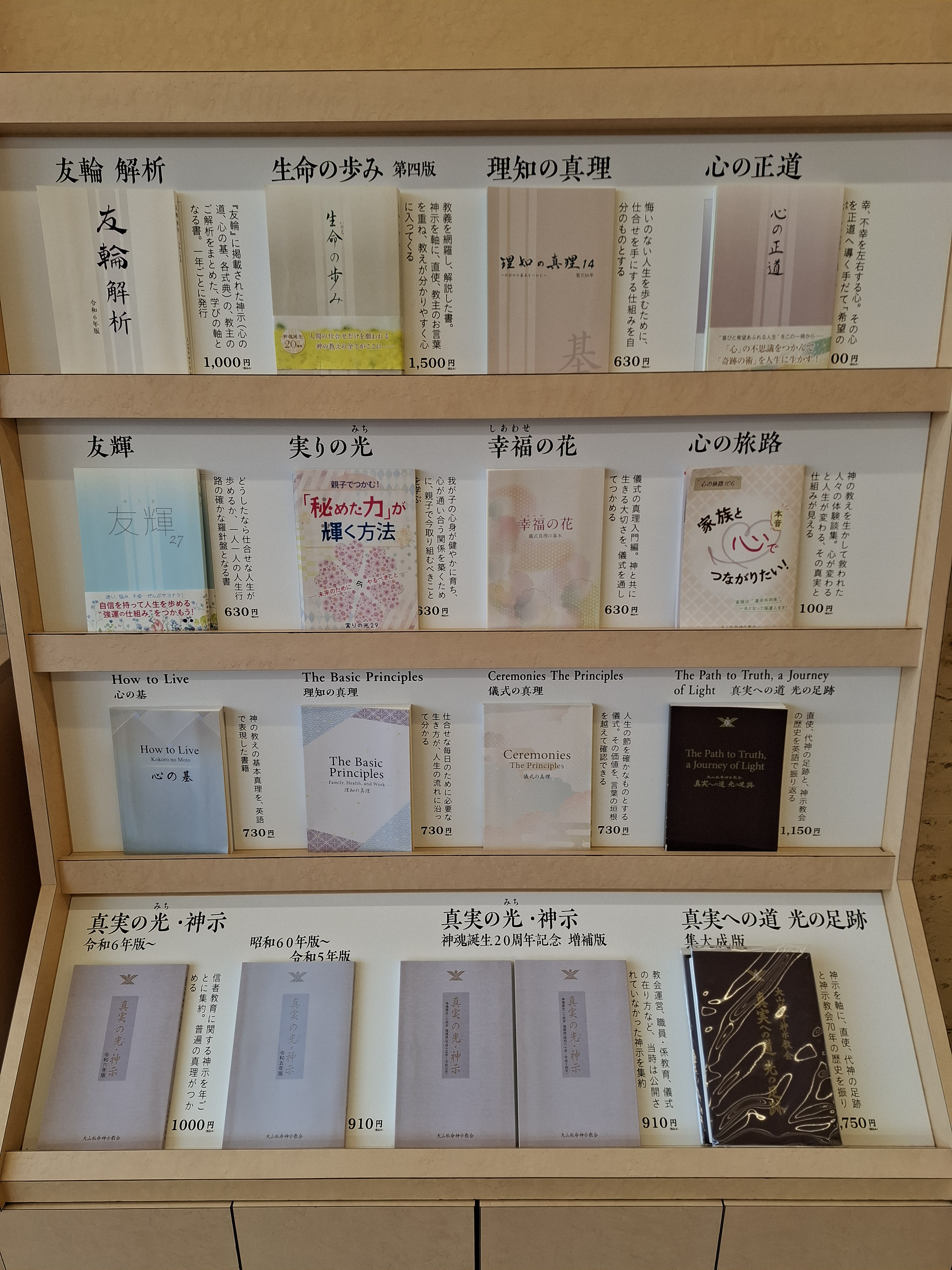
Sample books displayed at Ōyamanezunomikoto Shinji Kyōkai's bookstore

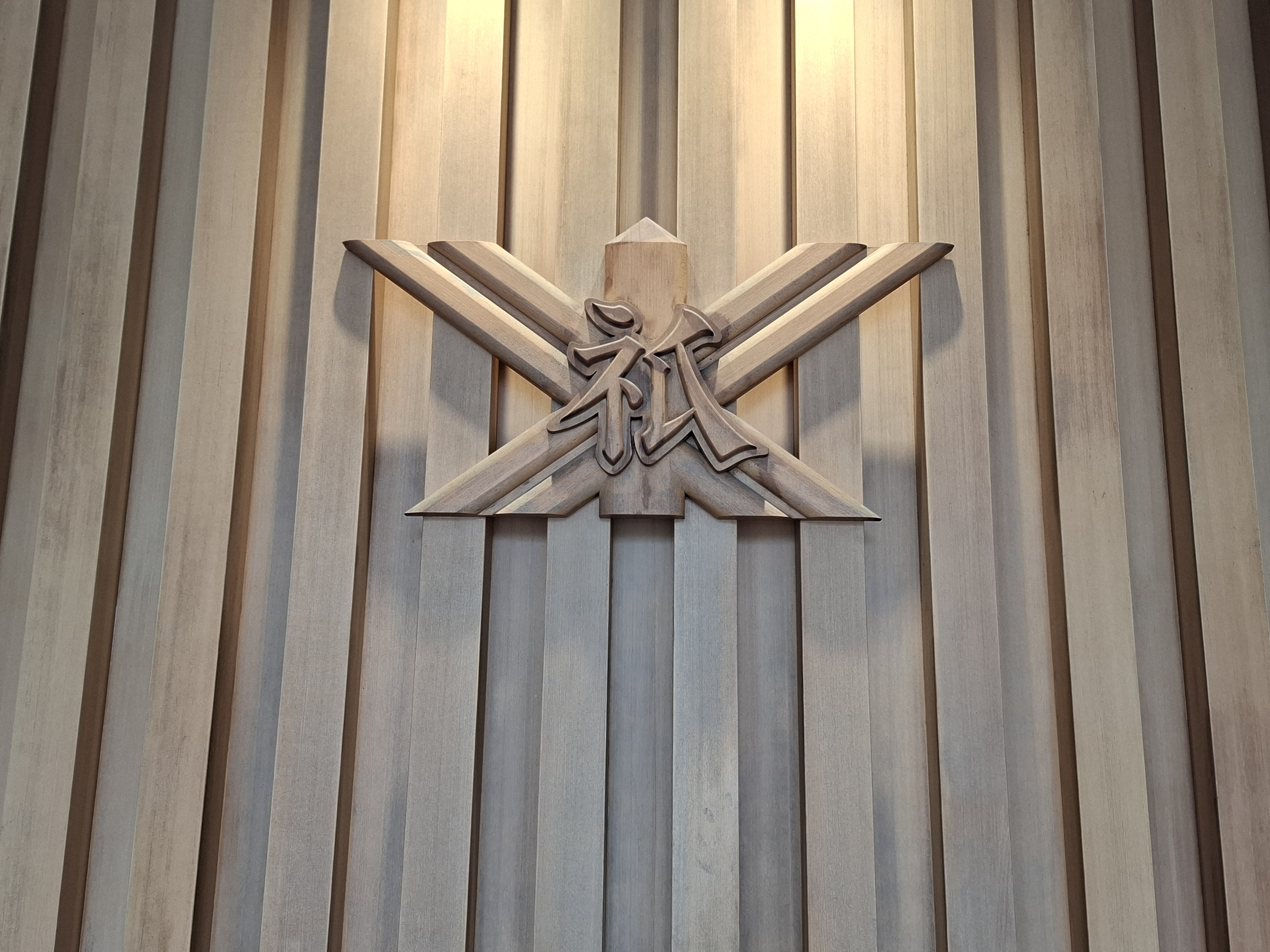
Ōyamanezunomikoto Shinji Kyōkai's official emblem

One of the religion's most important texts is Shinjitsu no hikari: shinji (真実の光・神示) (lit. 'True Light: Divine Revelations'), a collection of divine revelations.

English-language books published by Ōyamanezunomikoto Shinji Kyōkai include:

- The Path to Truth, a Journey of Light (2020) (Japanese original: Shinjitsu eno Michi Hikari no Sokuseki 真実への道 光の足跡, 2016) (history of the religion's leaders)
- The Basic Principles: Family, Health, and Work (2019) (Japanese original: Richi no Shinri 理知の真理, 2019) (bilingual, with English and Japanese)
- Ceremonies: The Principles (2019) (Japanese original: Gishiki no Shinri 儀式の真理, 2019) (bilingual, with English and Japanese)
- Kokoro no Tabiji: My Story (2022) (Japanese original: Kokoro no Tabiji 心の旅路 vols. 98–100, 2020–2022)
- How to Live (2016) (Japanese original: Kokoro no Moto 心の基, 2013)

== See also ==
- Ōyamatsumi
