= Ennokyo =

Japanese new religion

Coordinates: 35°04′30″N 135°01′23″E

- 円応教
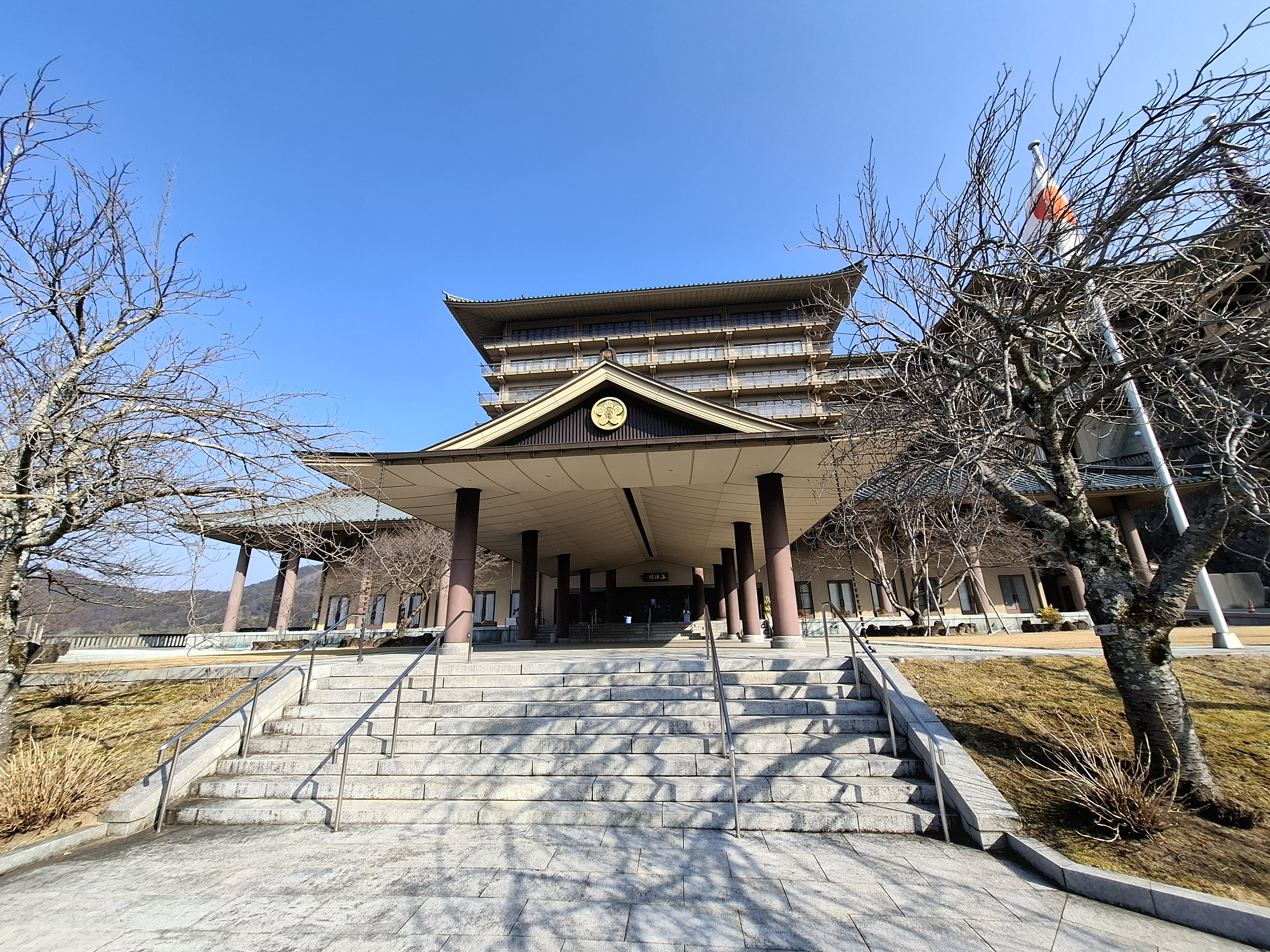
- Ennokyo headquarters at Tanba-shi, Hyōgo Prefecture in 2025
- Type: Japanese new religion
- Classification: Syncretic religion
- Scripture: Ennōkyō kyōten (円応教教典)
- Head priest: Fukada Hiromitsu (深田 充啓)
- Language: Japanese
- Headquarters: Muramori (村森), Sannan-cho (山南町), Tanba-shi, Hyōgo Prefecture, Japan
- Founder: Fukada Chiyoko (深田 千代子)
- Origin: July 16, 1919; Tanba-shi, Hyōgo Prefecture
- Tax status: Religious corporation
- Official website: ennokyo.jp

Ennokyo (円応教, Ennō-kyō) is a shinshūkyō (Japanese new religion). It is headquartered in Muramori (村森), Sannan-cho (山南町), Tanba-shi, Hyōgo Prefecture, Japan. It is a syncretic religion that combines features from Shinto, Buddhism, and other religious traditions. Ennokyo was founded in 1919 and was officially established as a religious corporation in 1948.

== History ==
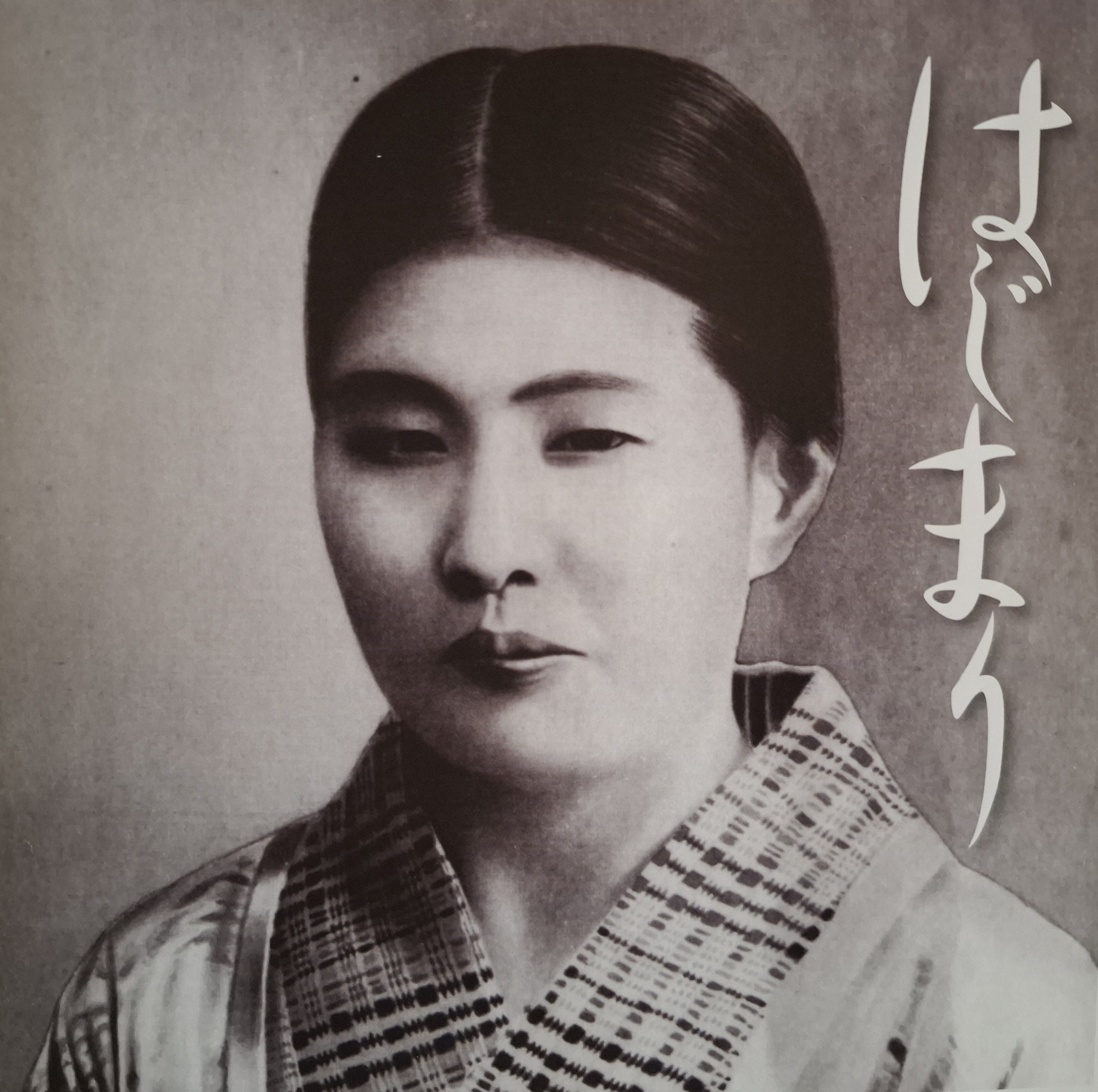
Official Ennokyo portrait of Fukada Chiyoko, the foundress of Ennokyo

Fukada Chiyoko (深田 千代子) (October 3, 1887 – January 6, 1925), the founder (教祖, kyōso) of the Ennokyo religion, founded Ennokyo on July 16, 1919 when she received a divine revelation. She was born in Ibara (井原), Sannan-cho (山南町), Tanba City, Hyōgo Prefecture, near Ennokyo's present-day headquarters. She died on January 6, 1925 from valvular heart disease. Today, she is revered by Ennokyo followers as Jishō-in Ennō Chikaku Daishi (慈照院圓應智覺大姉).

Fukada Nagaharu (深田 長治; March 25, 1908 – April 3, 1976), Chiyoko's eldest son, was the leader of the religion until his death in 1976. On June 10, 1948, he officially registered Ennokyo as a religious corporation as a merger of the two organizations Ennō Shūhōkai (円応修法会) and Ennō Hōonkai (円応報恩会).

On July 16, 1951, Fukada Nagaharu finished writing the Daily Prayers (日課勤行文, Nikka Gongyōbun). On February 6, 1952, he published the Ennokyo Scriptures (円応教教典, Ennōkyō Kyōten) and Doctrinal Outline (教義概要, Kyōgi Gaiyō). Fukada Nagaharu became vice-chairman and director of the Federation of New Religious Organizations of Japan (新宗連, Shinshuren) on November 28, 1975.

Fukada Hiromitsu (深田 充啓; born February 27, 1937), the eldest son of the first head priest Fukada Nagaharu, became the second head priest on April 6, 1976. In 1979, he published What is Ennokyo? (円応教とは, Ennōkyō to wa), a compilation of 277 questions and answers about Ennokyo. He is currently serving as Honorary Chairman of the Shinshuren. Fukada Keiko (深田 惠子; born January 6, 1968), the eldest daughter of head priest Fukada Hiromitsu, is Fukada Hiromitsu's designated successor.

== Beliefs and doctrines ==
Ennokyo is a syncretic religion based on Shinto, Buddhism, and other religious traditions. It permits its followers to worship any deity, as long as Ōmioya (大御親), also known as Ōmioya-sama (大御親様) (the name for God in Ennokyo), and its founder Fukada Chiyoko are both revered. Ennokyo encourages its followers to perform ancestor worship according to the family's or clan's own traditions.

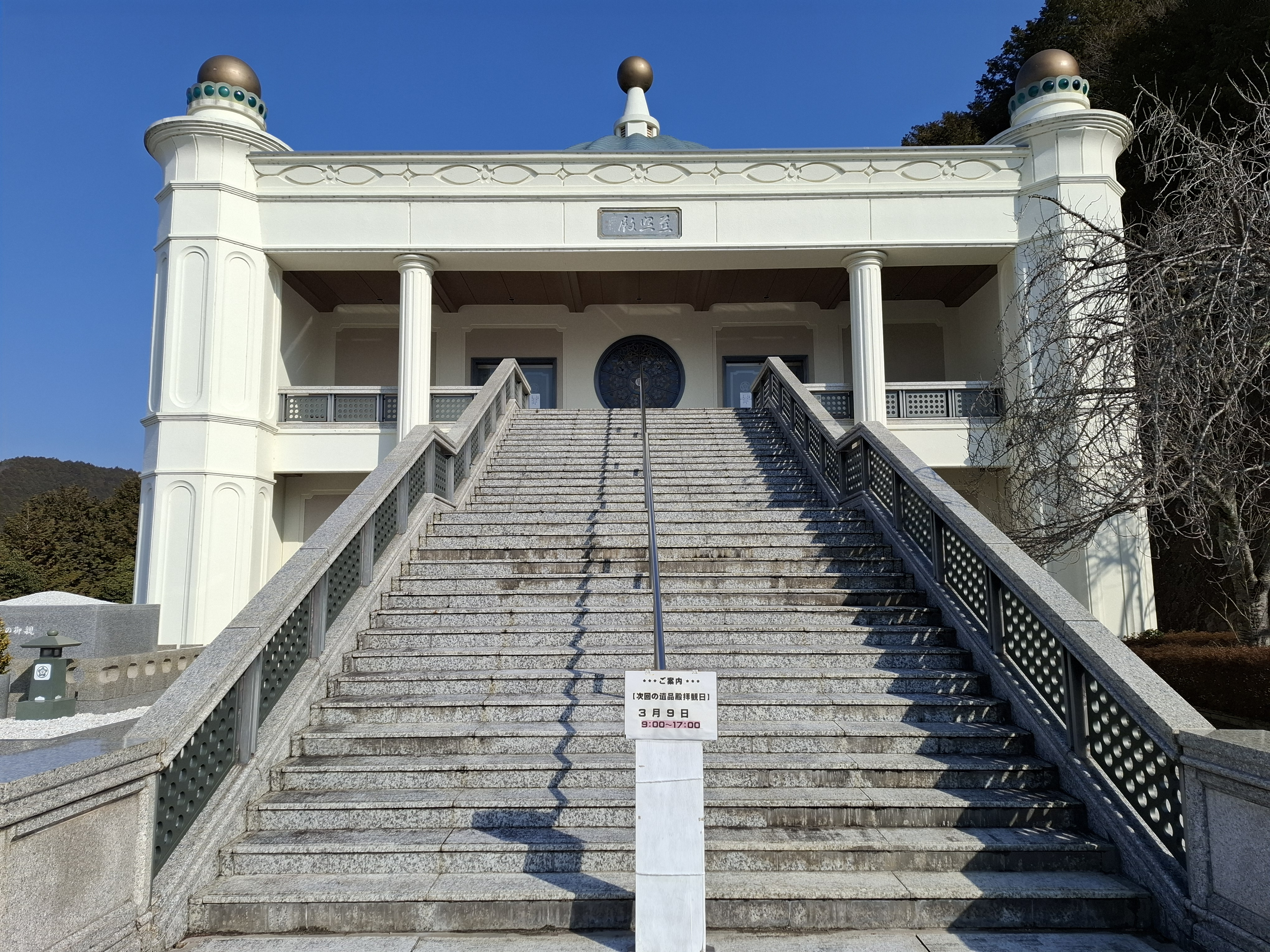
Jishō-den (慈照殿), a memorial hall dedicated to Fukada Chiyoko, the foundress of Ennokyo

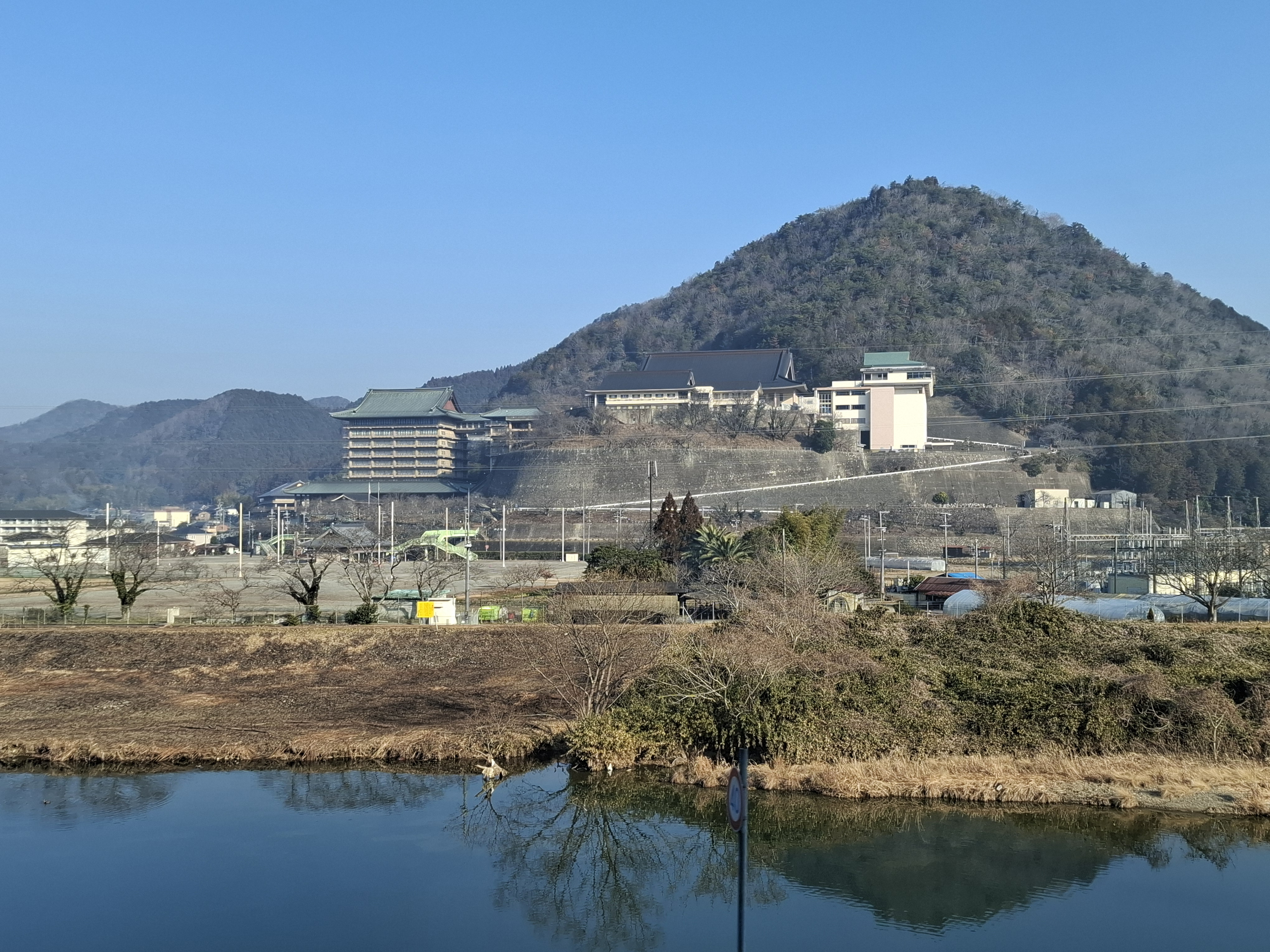
The Ennokyo headquarters complex as seen from a train

Ennokyo has five official principles (教義の五綱目), which are:

- Mato (まと) ("object of worship"): God, Buddha, and other deities can all be worshipped as long as worship is performed with a sincere heart.
- Sincerity (makoto 誠)
- Love (ai 愛)
- Virtue (zen 善)
- Kage no gyō (陰の行) ("hidden good deeds")

The religion's official emblem consists of the kyūjitai kanji character 覺 (kaku), which means 'awakening', placed inside a five-petal flower. The five petals represent the five official principles (教義の五綱目).

== Texts ==
Below is a list of Ennokyo scriptures and doctrinal texts.

- Nikka gongyōbun (日課勤行文) (daily prayers)
- Ennōkyō kyōten (円応教教典) (doctrine/scriptures)
- Kyōgi gaiyō (教義概要) (summary of doctrines)
- Kyōsoden (教祖伝) (biography of the foundress)
- O-kyōso-sama (御教祖様) (manga version of the biography of the foundress)
- O-kyōso-sama o-ibunshū (御教祖様御遺文集) (four volumes: upper, middle, lower, additional 上･中･下･補の4巻) (collection of writings by the foundress)
- Jikaku hansei sangemon (自覚反省懺悔文) (self-reflection and repentance)
- Seinen jikun (青年自訓) (self-instruction for youth)
- Shinja kunkai no kaigi (信者訓戒の解義) (interpretation of guidance for believers)
- Ennōkyō kisoku oyobi kitei (円応教規則及び規程) (Ennokyo rules and regulations)
- Makoto no michi (まことの道) (the sincere path)
Books displayed at the Ennokyo headquarters bookstore

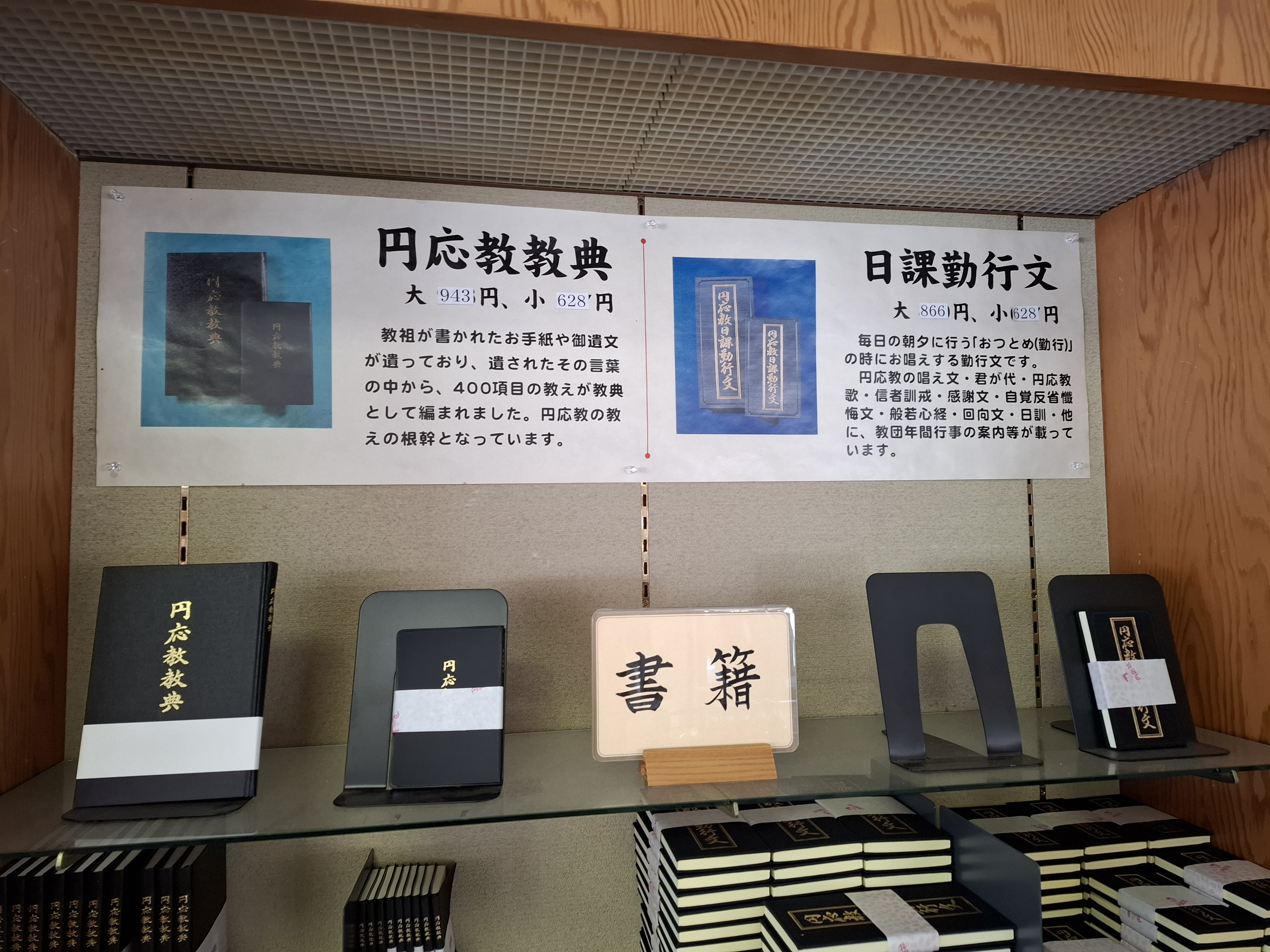

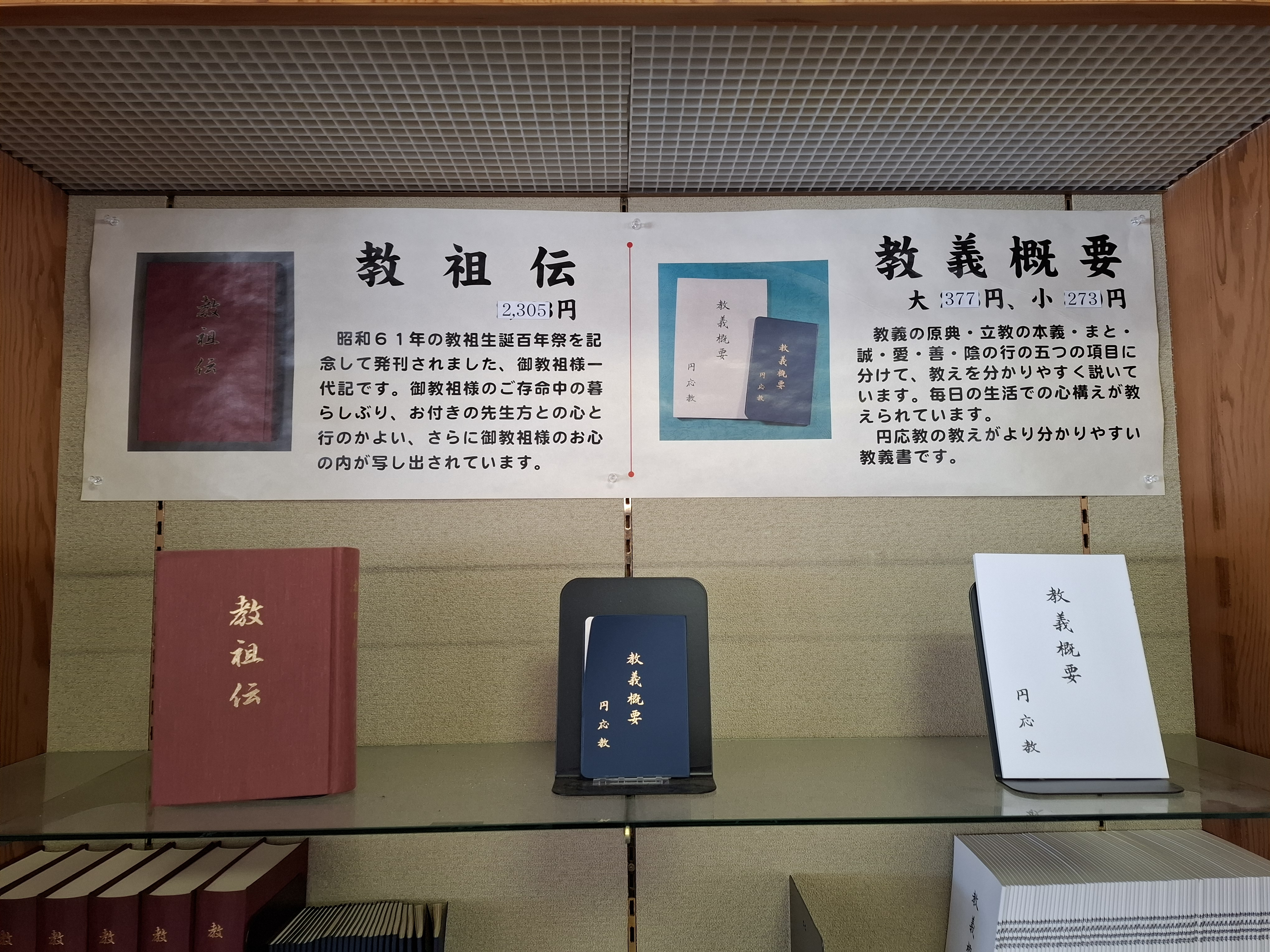

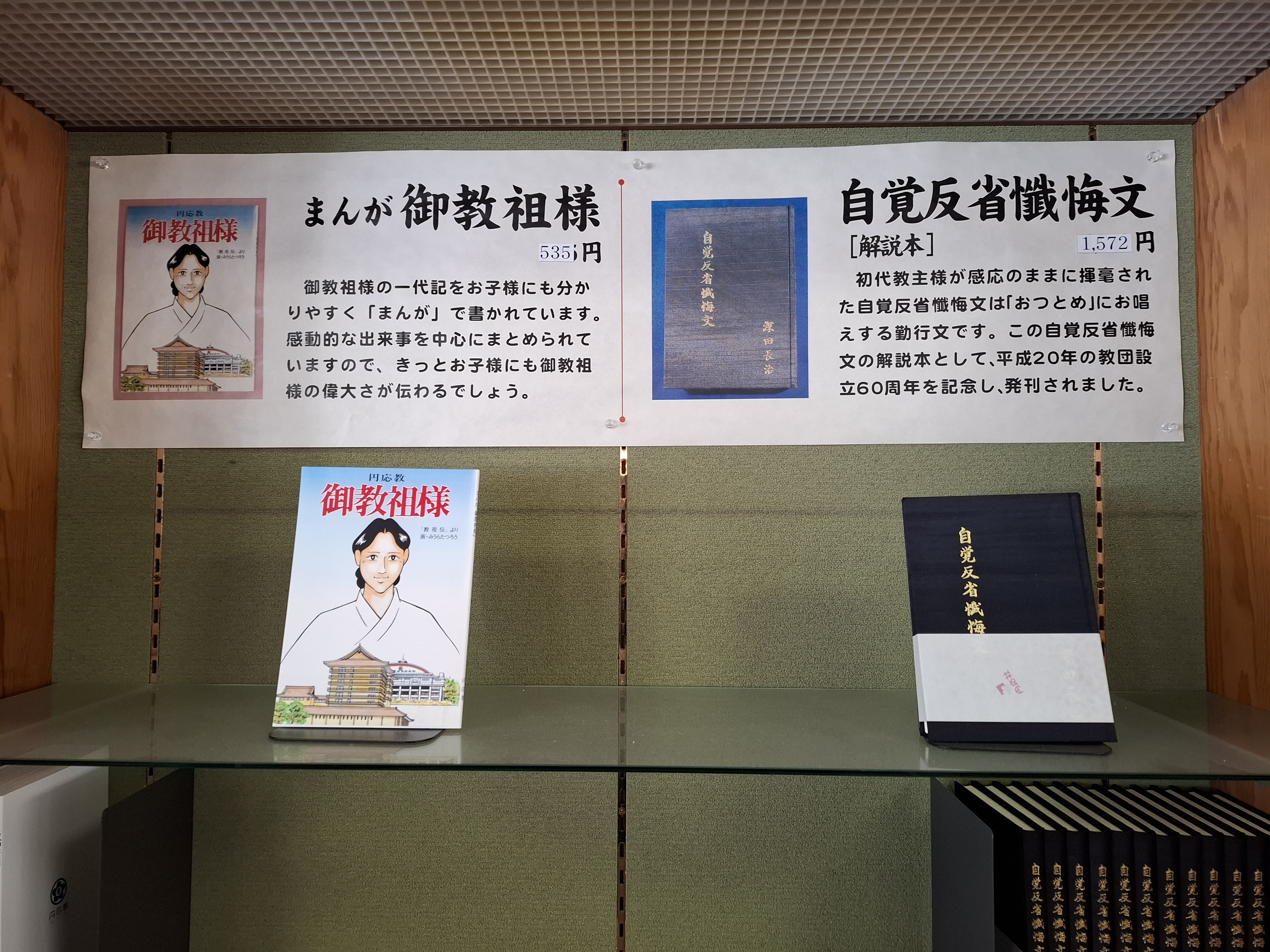

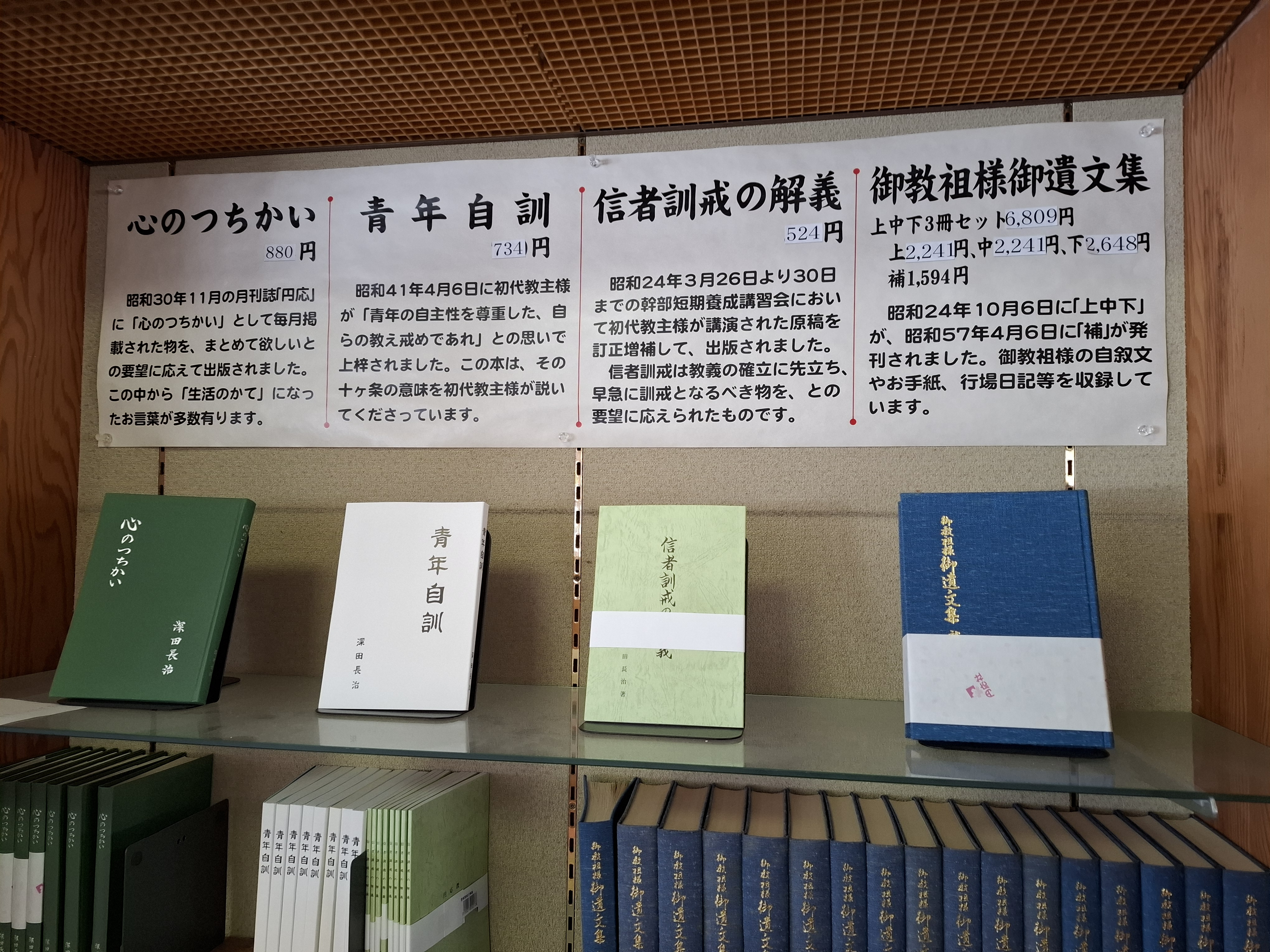

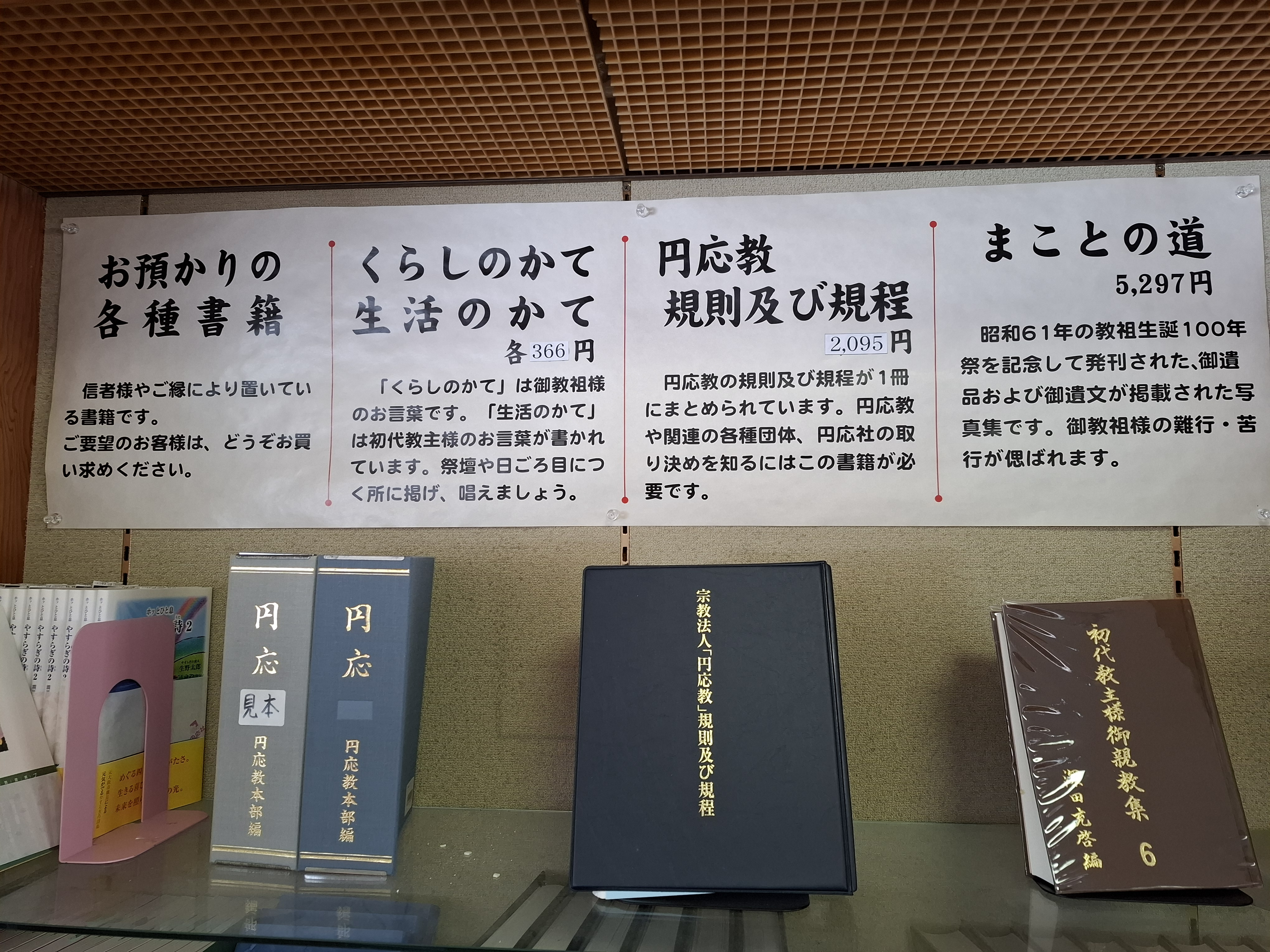

== Affiliations ==
Ennokyo is part of the Federation of New Religious Organizations of Japan (新宗連, Shinshuren).

== See also ==
- Shinto sects and schools
