= Tensokokyo =

Japanese new religion based in Nagoya

Tensokōkyō
- 天祖光教
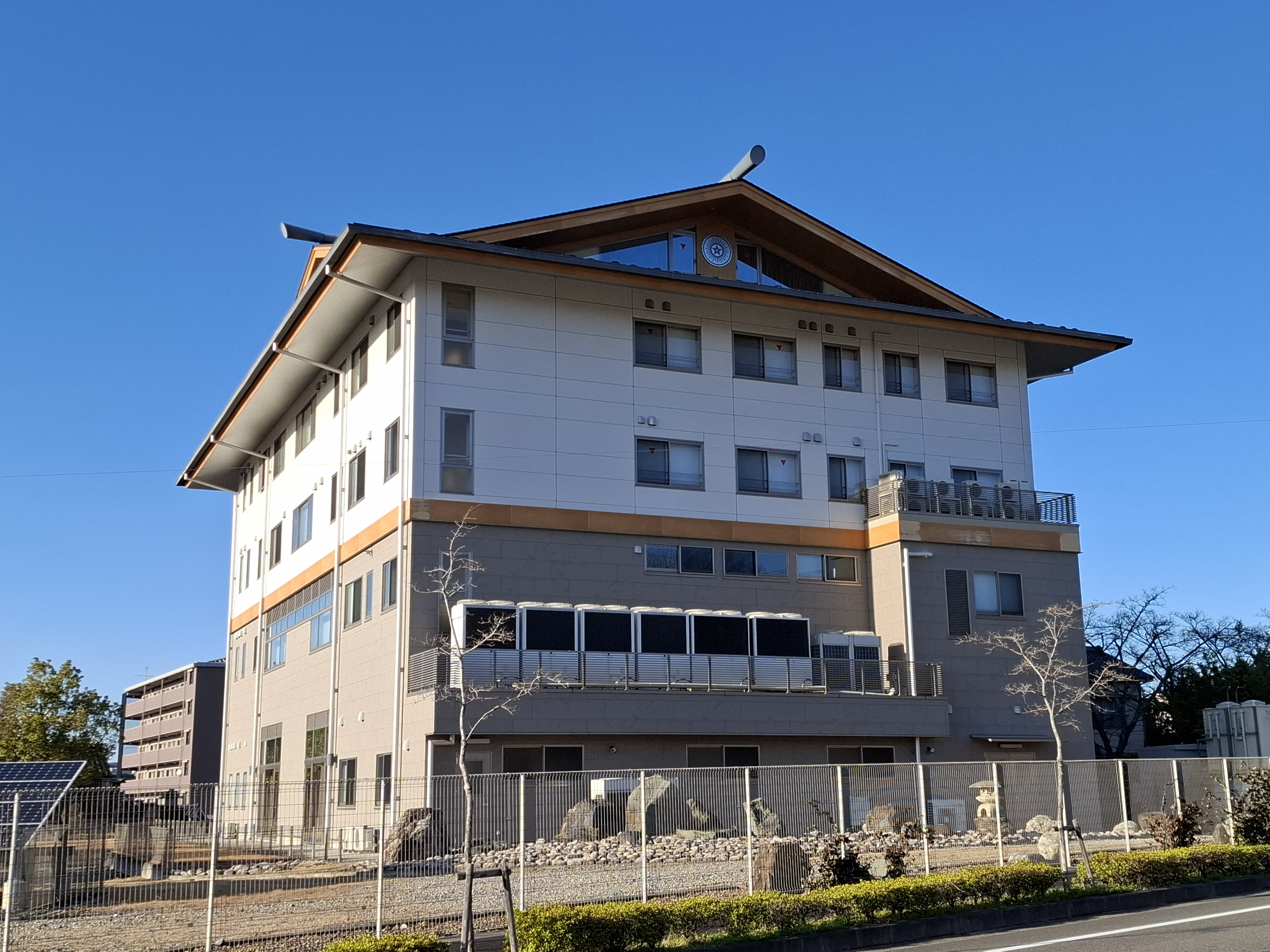
- Tensokōkyō Headquarters in Nagoya
- Headquarters: Moriyama-ku, Nagoya
- Founder: Shimizu Shin'ichi (清水信一)
- Origin: 1942
- Members: 9,602 in 2025
- Official website: www.tensokokyo.or.jp
- Slogan: Nichi-Nichi Ten Tō (日日点灯)

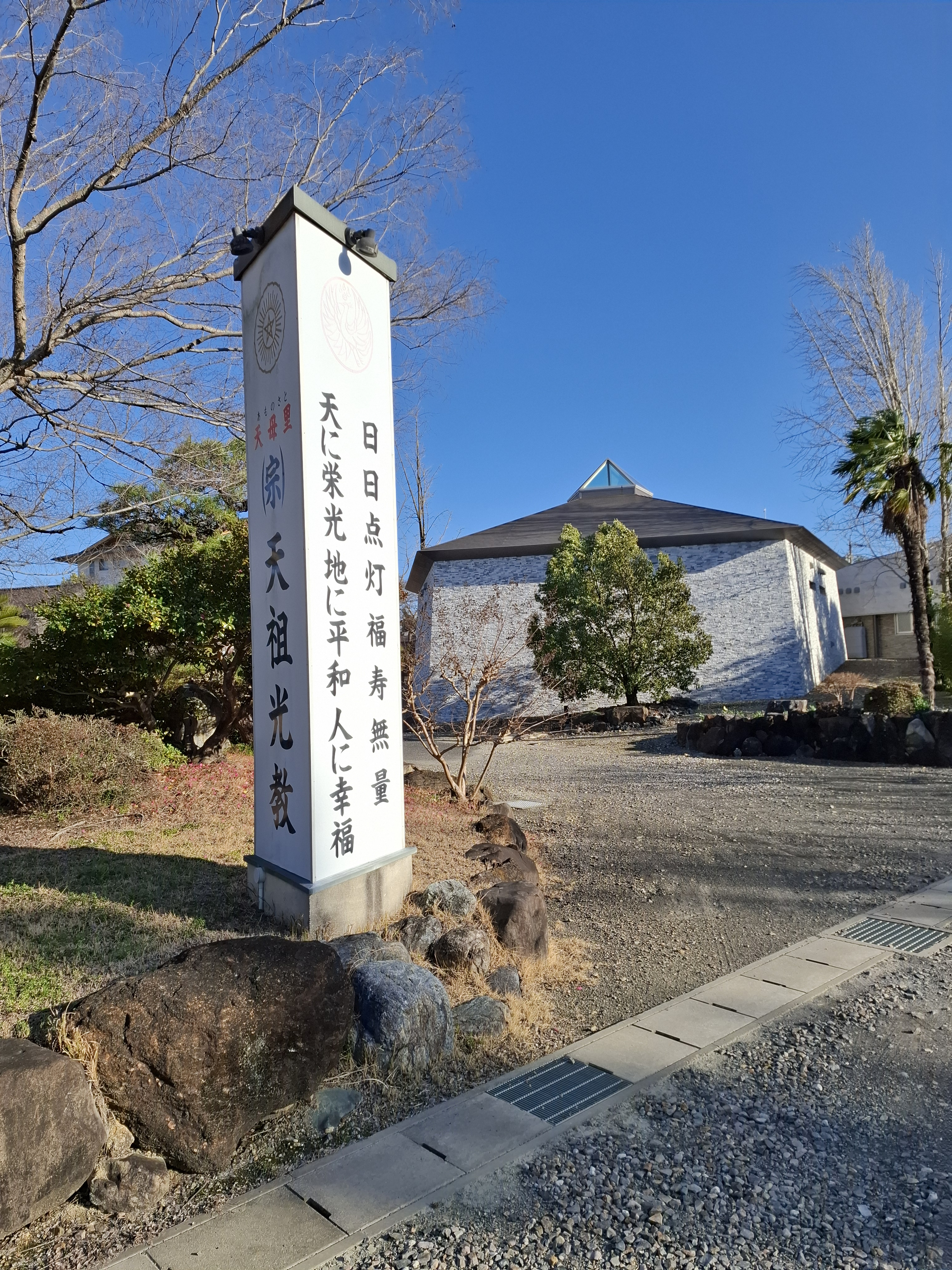
The mantra Nichi-Nichi Ten Tō (日日点灯) inscribed on a pillar at Tensokōkyō's headquarters

Tensokōkyō (Japanese: 天祖光教) is a Japanese new religion that is classified neither as Sect Shinto nor Japanese Buddhism. The headquarters of Tensokōkyō is located in Moriyama-ku, Nagoya.

It was founded in 1942 by Shimizu Shin'ichi (清水信一, 1910–1969), who is also known by his followers as Beigan no Kuju (蔽顔の救主) (lit. '"Hidden Face Savior"'). The religion considers him to be an incarnation of the Heavenly Savior (天降の救世寿), who had also manifested himself in the past as the Buddha, Jesus, Laozi, Confucius, and Muhammad.

Outside of Japan, there were attempts of proselytization to attract followers in South Korea.

== Teachings ==
It is a Shinto-based teachings that are heavily inspired by Buddhist and Christian teachings, particularly warning against immoral actions. (Note: This is similar to the now-defunct Tenri Sanrinkō's attempt to merge Buddhist and Christian teachings under a Shinto-inspired doctrinal context.) The immoral actions are "greed, anger, gluttony, dishonesty and other evils" as designated by Shinto, Buddhism, and Christianity in unison.

== Scriptures ==
The religion's main scriptures, written by its founder, include Voice of the Sphinx (スフィンクスの声), as well as a collection of hymns known as the "Heavenly Sacred Hymns" (天降の聖歌). Its mantra is Nichi-Nichi Ten Tō (日日点灯) ("everyday, lighting candles/lights") in full: 日日点灯福寿無量天降救世主).

== Schisms ==
Rurikyō-kai (瑠璃教会), founded by Matsui Ruritoshi (松井瑠璃寿), split off from Tensokōkyō in 1953.

== See also ==
- Dōkai, a similar Japanese new religion that adopted teachings of Christianity
