= Fukada Chiyoko =

Japanese founder of Ennōkyō (1887–1925)

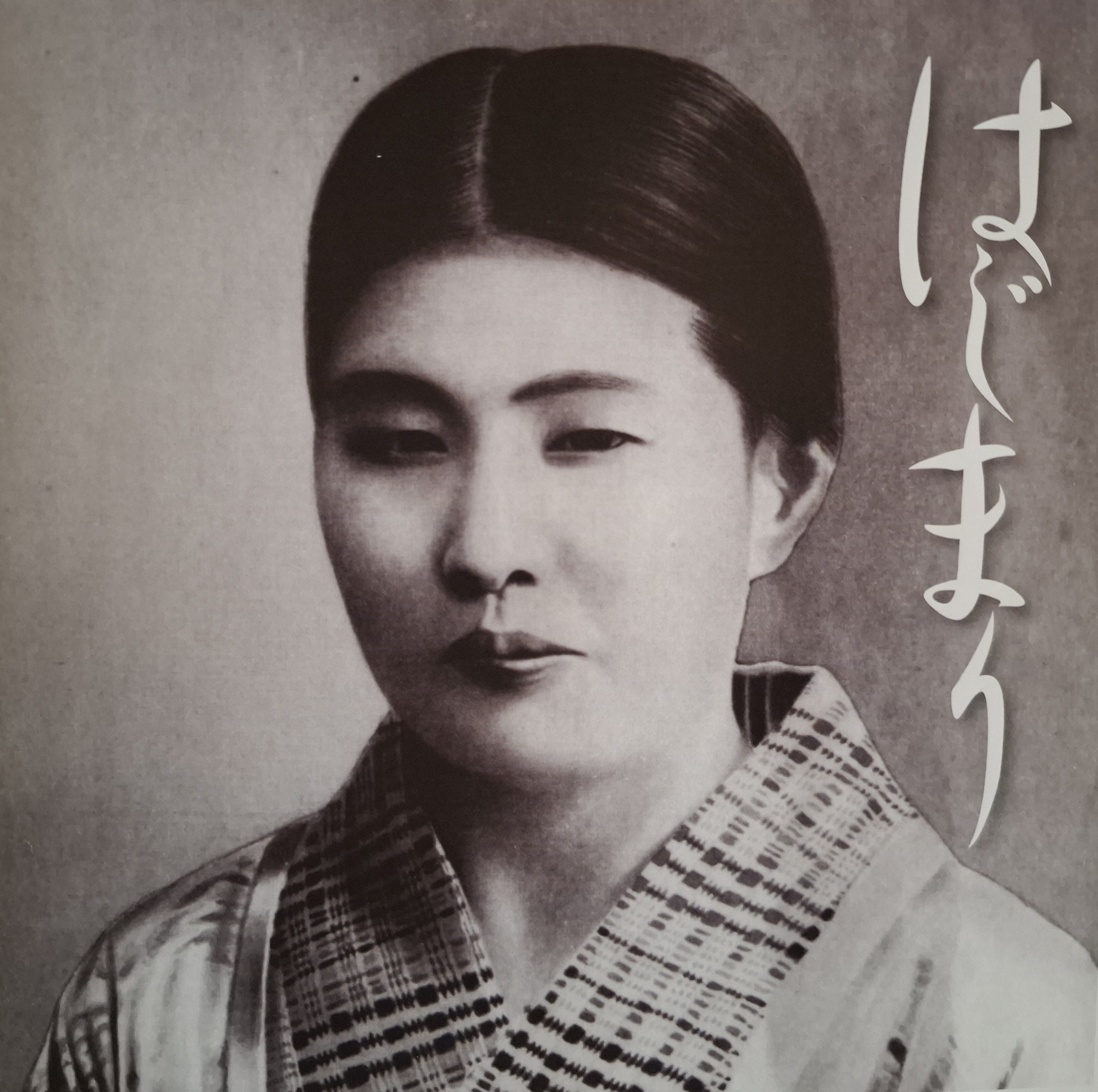
- Official Ennokyo portrait of Fukada Chiyoko
- Title: Jishō-in Ennō Chikaku Daishi (慈照院圓應智覺大姉) (posthumous)

Personal life
- Born: Fukada Chiyoko (深田 千代子); 3 October 1887 Ibara, Ogawa Village, Hikami District, Hyōgo (兵庫県氷上郡小川村字井原) (now Tanba, Hyōgo (兵庫県丹波市))
- Died: 6 January 1925 (aged 37) Tanba, Hyōgo, Japan
- Known for: Founder of Ennōkyō (円応教)
- Occupation: Religious teacher

Religious life
- Religion: Shintō-derived Japanese new religion (神道系新宗教)

Fukada Chiyoko (深田 千代子) (October 3, 1887 – January 6, 1925) was the Japanese founder of Ennōkyō (円応教), a Japanese new religion based in Tamba, Hyōgo Prefecture. She began her religious career after receiving a divine revelation on July 16, 1919. For the next five and a half years until her death at the age of 37, she carried out faith healing and teaching that attracted numerous followers.

== Biography ==
Fukada was born in Ogawa Village (小川村), Hikami District (氷上郡), Hyōgo (now Tanba City). On July 16, 1919 (Taishō 8), at the age of 33, she received a divine revelation (天啓, tenkei). This date is commemorated by Ennōkyō as the religion's founding day (立教の日, rikkyō no hi).

From 1919 until her death in 1925, Fukada employed a distinctive set of esoteric devotional and healing practices known as shūhō (修法). She gained many followers from the surrounding region due to her charisma and reports of healings.

She died on January 6, 1925 from valvular heart disease.

== Legacy ==
In the Ennōkyō religion, Fukada is commemorated with the posthumous title Jishō-in Ennō Chikaku Daishi (慈照院圓應智覺大姉).

After Fukada Chiyoko's death, her children and disciples organized the Ennō Hōshūkai (円応報修会) (renamed Ennō Shūhōkai (円応修法会) in 1931) and a separate Ennō Hōonkai (円応報恩会) (founded in 1933). Both groups were dissolved under the 1940 Religious Organizations Law during World War II. After War World II, Ennō Shūhōkai was revived in 1947, and Ennōkyō (円応教) was organized in 1948 under the Religious Corporations Ordinance; it later merged with Ennō Hōonkai and, in 1952, gained recognition as an independent religious corporation under the Religious Corporations Law.

During the postwar years, leadership centered on the founder's eldest son Fukada Nagaharu (深田 長治) (1908–1976) as first head priest and Fukada Hiromitsu (深田 充啓) (b. 1937) as second head priest. Fukada Nagaharu organized his mother's teachings and writings into a coherent doctrine, emphasizing teachings such as:

- "common root of Heaven and Earth" (tenchi dōkon (天地同根))
- "unity of mind and matter" (busshin ichinyo (物心一如))
- "unity of all religions" (bankyō ichigen (万教一元))
- "life itself is religion" (seikatsu soku shūkyō (生活即宗教))
