= Mount Misen (Ayabe) =

Sacred mountain in Ayabe, Kyoto, Japan

- Misen-zan (弥仙山)
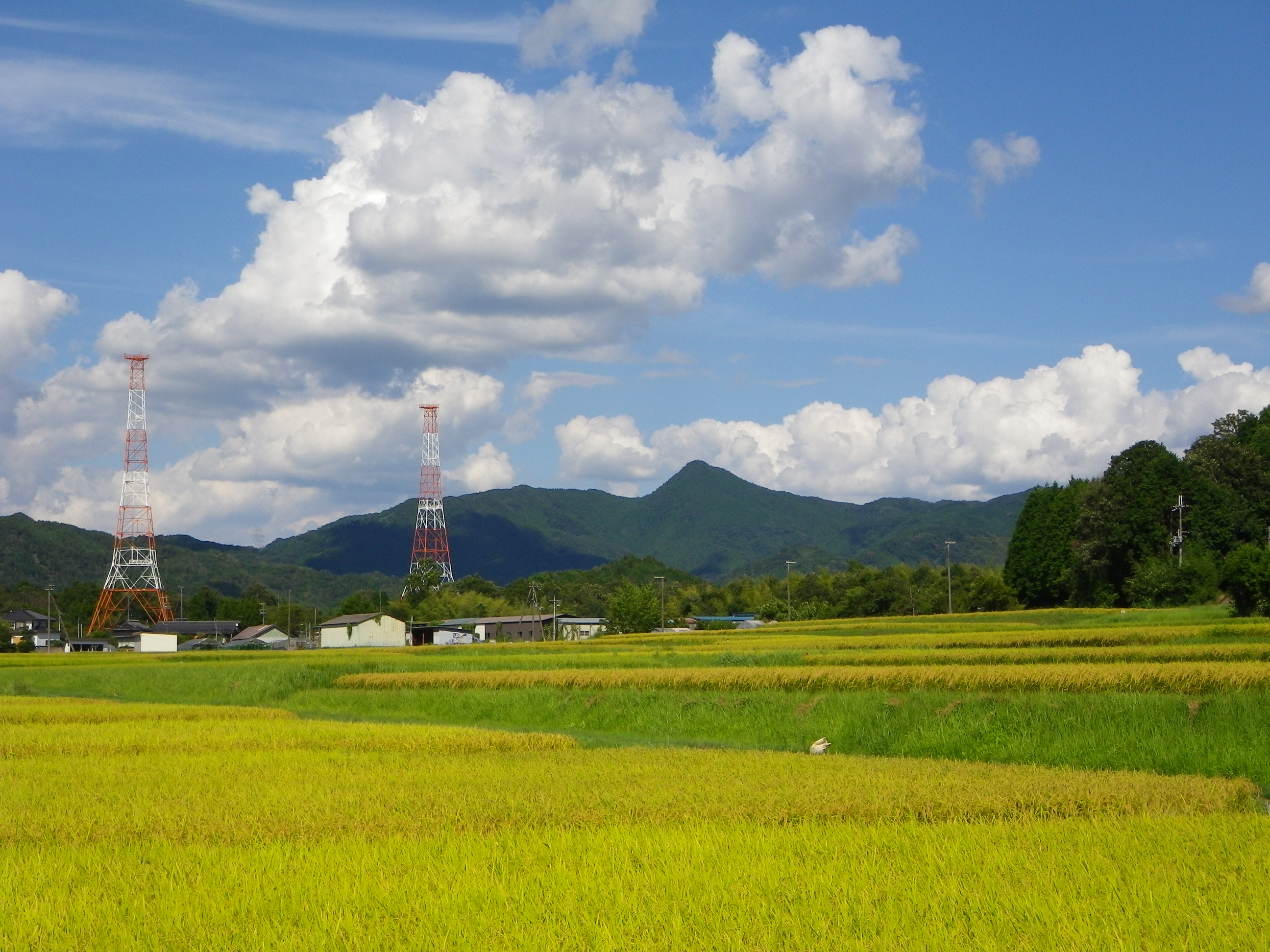
- Mount Misen (conical peak in the center) as viewed from the southwest

Highest point
- Elevation: 664 m (2,178 ft)
- Coordinates: 35°23′28″N 135°22′41″E

Geography
- Location: Ayabe, Kyoto Prefecture, Japan

Mount Misen (弥仙山, Misen-zan) is a mountain in Oyogi-cho (於与岐町), Ayabe, Kyoto Prefecture, Japan that is considered to be sacred by the Oomoto religion.

== History and sacred sites ==
Osei Jinja (於成神社) on Mount Misen is where the religion's founder, Nao Deguchi, secluded herself in October 19, 1901 (lunar calendar date: September 8, 1901) and received divine revelations (as described in Chapter 10 of Volume 38 in the Reikai Monogatari). Nao Deguchi would perform daily ablutions at a nearby waterfall called Fudo Waterfall, which is also known today as Ōmoto kaiso shūgyō no taki (大本開祖修業の滝). Osei Jinja and the waterfall are situated near each other, and both of them are located about midway up the mountain.

On May 24, 1903 (lunar calendar date: April 28, 1903), Nao Deguchi ascended the mountain again with Onisaburo Deguchi and her daughter Sumiko Deguchi to honor the mountain's deities at Kinpū Jinja (金峰神社) on the summit of Mount Misen.

According to Michi no Shiori,

The mountain Misen in Oyogi 於与岐 (in the district of Tango 丹後) is the holy mountain where are honoured the god Konohanasakuya-hime and the god Hikohohodemi. These two gods govern the holy function of mediation between the gods.

Mikumari Jinja (水分神社) is located at the foot of the mountain.

== Access ==
The nearest JR train stations are Magura Station and Umezako Station.

== See also ==
- Mount Hongū (Ayabe)
- Mount Takakuma
