= Maizuru Line =

Railway line in Kyoto prefecture, Japan

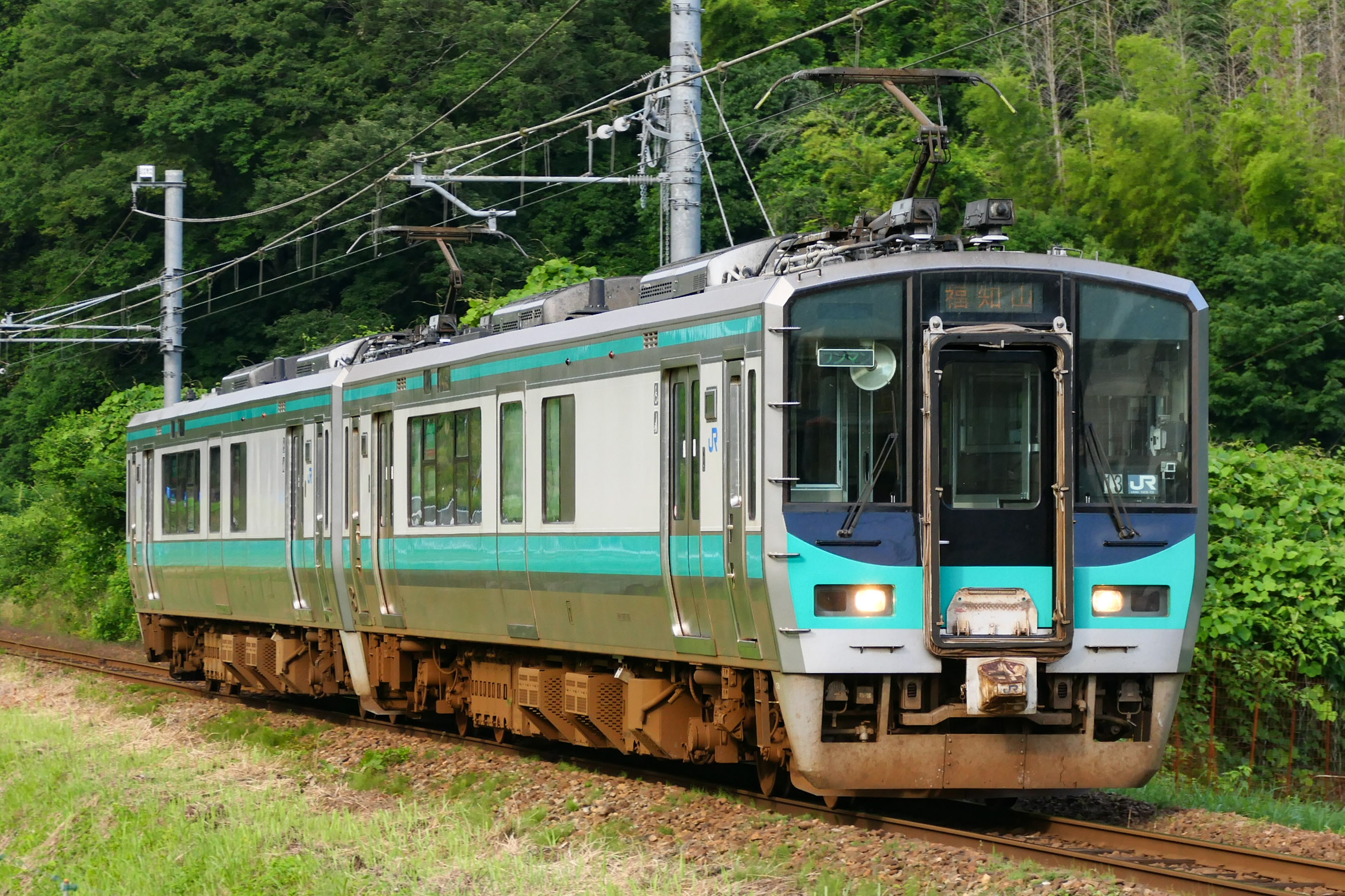
- A 125 series train on the Maizuru Line in 2025

Overview
- Owner: JR West
- Locale: Kyoto Prefecture
- Termini: Ayabe; Higashi-Maizuru
- Stations: 6

Service
- Type: Heavy rail

History
- Opened: 1904; 122 years ago

Technical
- Line length: 26.4 km (16.4 mi)
- Track gauge: 1,067 mm (3 ft 6 in)
- Electrification: 1,500 V DC overhead wire

The Maizuru Line (舞鶴線, Maizuru-sen) is a 26.4 km (16.4 mi) railway line in Kyoto Prefecture, Japan, operated by the West Japan Railway Company (JR West). It connects Ayabe and Higashi-Maizuru, the line beyond there being called the Obama Line connecting to Tsuruga.

== Stations ==
Name	Japanese	Distance (km)	Transfers	Location	
Ayabe	綾部	0.0	E Sanin Main Line	Ayabe	Kyoto Prefecture
Fuchigaki	淵垣	5.3		Ayabe	Kyoto Prefecture
Umezako	梅迫	8.2		Ayabe	Kyoto Prefecture
Magura	真倉	15.5		Maizuru	Kyoto Prefecture
Nishi-Maizuru	西舞鶴	19.5	■M Kyoto Tango Railway (Willer Trains) Miyamai Line (M8)	Maizuru	Kyoto Prefecture
Higashi-Maizuru	東舞鶴	26.4	Obama Line	Maizuru	Kyoto Prefecture

== History ==
The line opened in the autumn of 1904 to transport troops and materiel to the naval base and Maizuru-Higashi Port during the Russo-Japanese War, which commenced in February of that year. Although built by the Japanese Government, it was initially leased to Hankaku Railway Company (sometimes erroneously transliterated as Bantsuru Railway), which opened the Ayabe–Fukuchiyama section of what is now the San'in Main Line.

The company was nationalised in 1907, the year the 2 km Maizurukō Line (舞鶴港線) from Nishi-Maizuru to Maizuru Port opened. Passenger services operated on that branch between 1913 and 1924, and it closed in 1985.

Nishi-Maizuru was also the junction for the 4 km Naka-Maizuru Line (中舞鶴線) to Naka-Maizuru which operated between 1919 and 1972.

The line was electrified in 1999.

From the start of the revised timetable on 13 March 2021, Rapid trains that passed through Magura Station were discontinued and were changed to Local trains.

From the start of the revised timetable on 18 March 2023, 125 series trainsets began operation on the Maizuru Line.
