= Gunze =

Japanese clothing brand

Gunze Limited
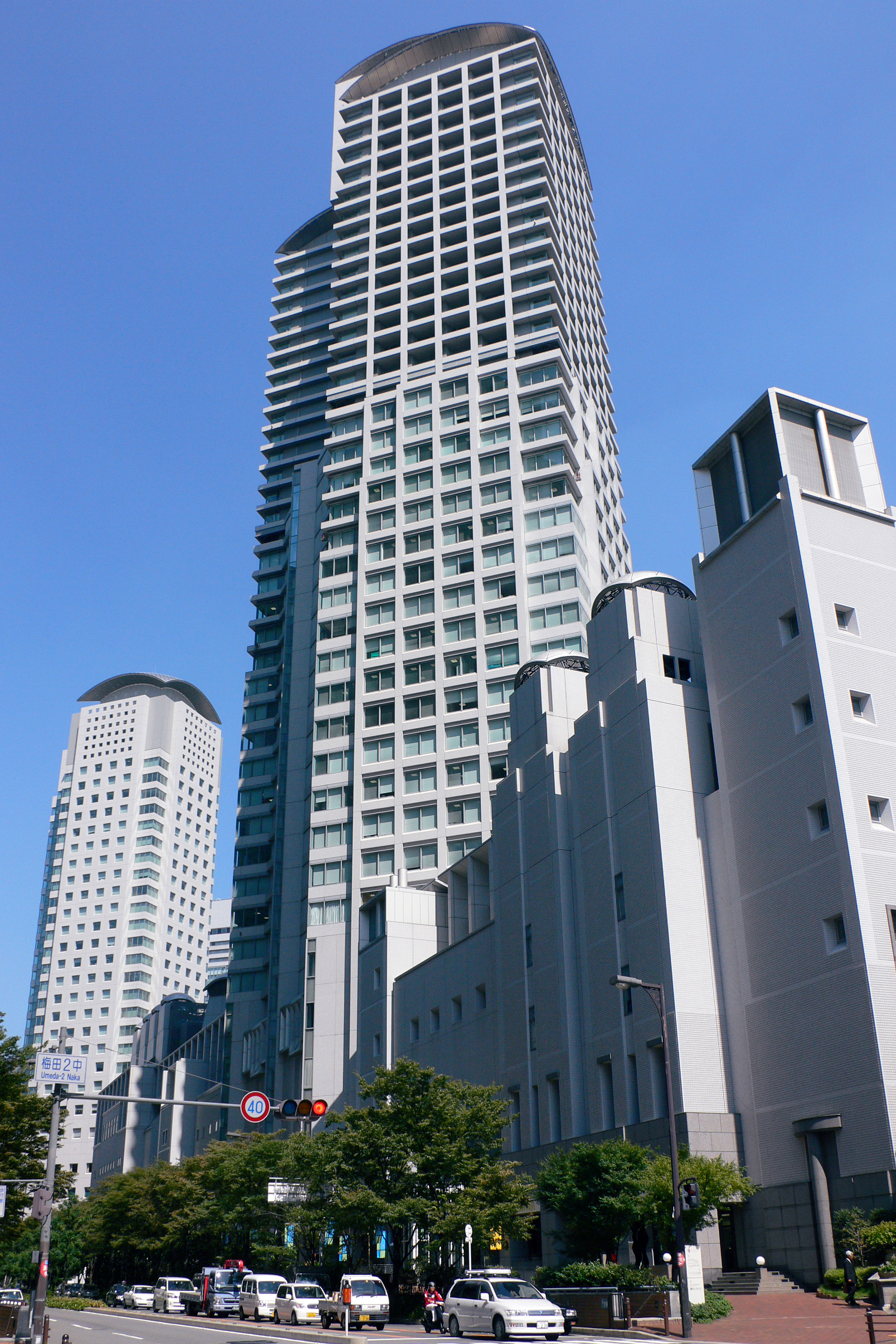
- Headquarters in Kita-ku, Osaka
- Native name: グンゼ株式会社
- Romanized name: Gunze Kabushiki-gaisha
- Formerly: Gunze Silk Manufacturing Co., Ltd. (1896-1943, 1946-1967); Gunze Industries Co., Ltd. (1943-1946)
- Company type: Public KK
- Traded as: TYO: 3002
- Founded: August 10, 1896; 129 years ago
- Headquarters: Umeda, Kita-ku, Osaka, Japan
- Area served: Worldwide
- Products: Clothing
- Website: Official website

Gunze Limited (グンゼ株式会社, Gunze Kabushiki-gaisha) is a Japanese clothing brand with its registered head office in Ayabe, Kyoto Prefecture, its Osaka head office, and a Tokyo office. It was established on August 10, 1896, by Tsurukichi Hatano, and was originally known as Gunze Silk Manufacturing Co., Ltd. .

The company started the Gunze Blue-Mountain Underwear brand in association with Daiei in 1962, and this brand was used for all sexes before the introduction of the Christie brand for women in 1968. In a three-year period from 1962 the brand made up 6 percent of Daiei's turnover of underwear. It began selling its clothing in Thailand in 2000.

The company's flagship outlet is in Harajuku.
