= Mount Hongū (Ayabe) =

Sacred mountain in Ayabe, Kyoto, Japan

- Hongūyama (本宮山)
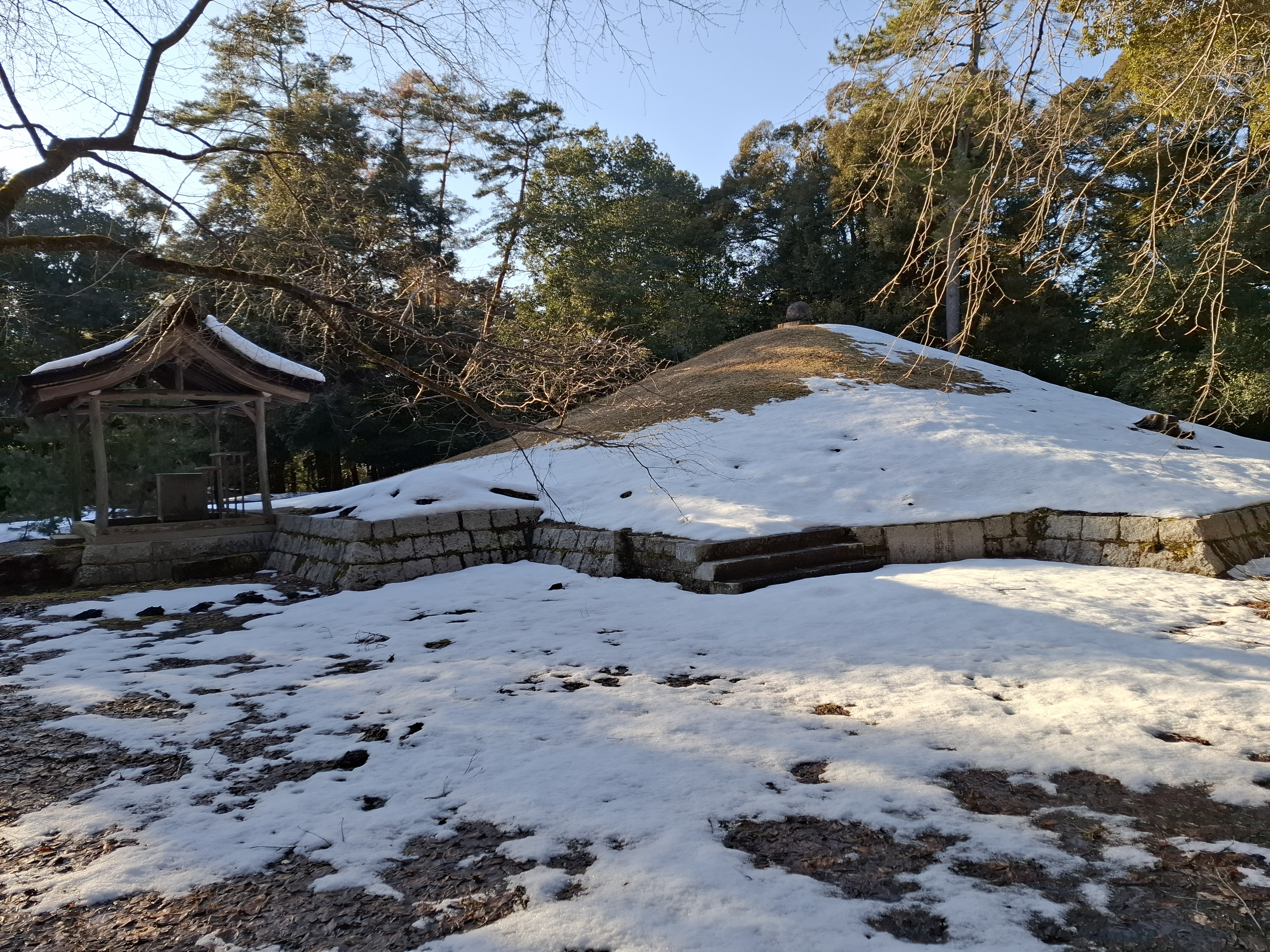
- The summit of Mount Hongū during winter

Highest point
- Elevation: 92 m (302 ft)
- Coordinates: 35°17′39″N 135°15′43″E

Geography
- Location: Ayabe, Kyoto Prefecture, Japan

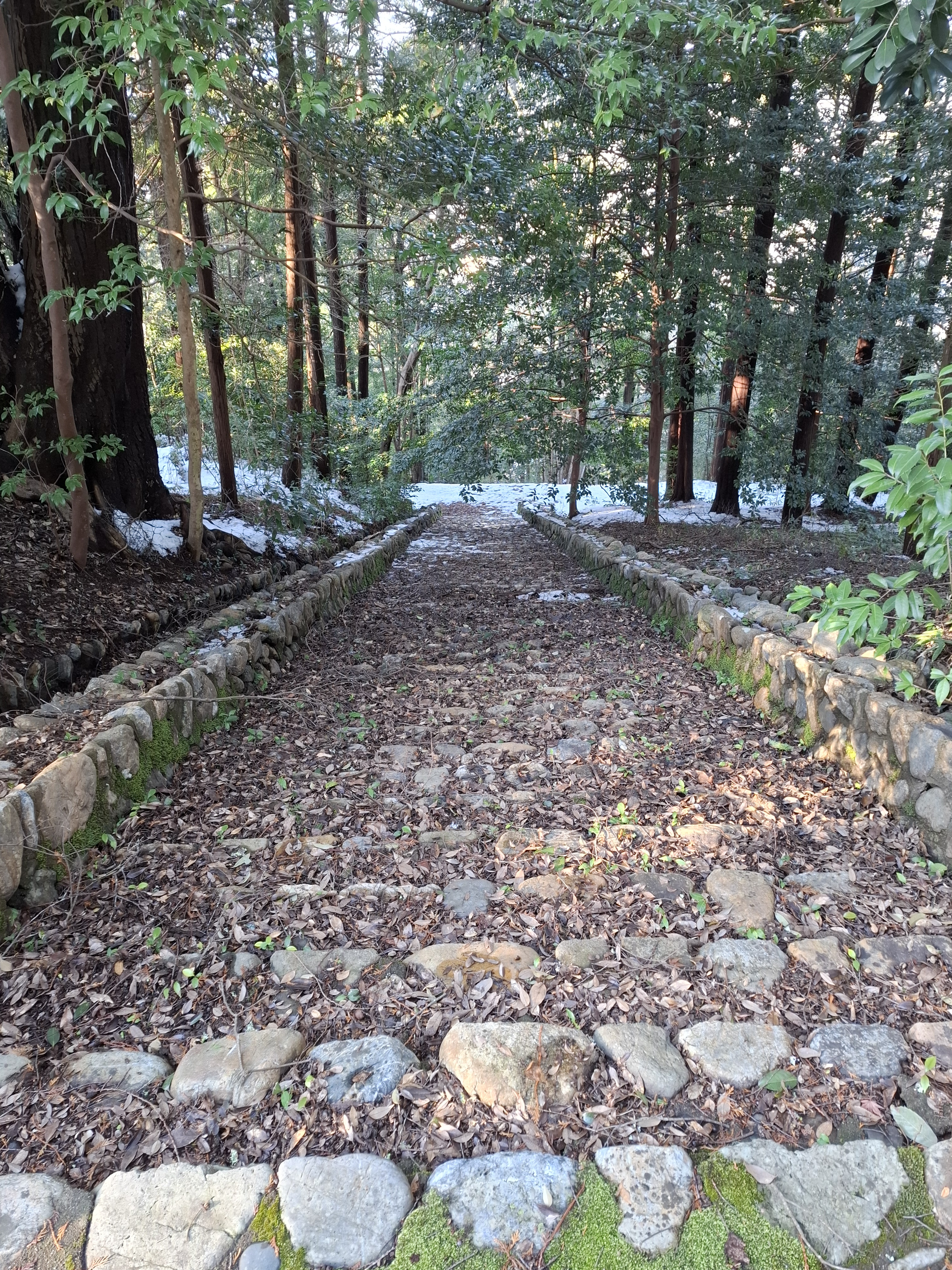
Steps leading down from the summit of Mount Hongu

Mount Hongū (Japanese: 本宮山, Hepburn: Hongū-yama), occasionally also known as Tsuruyama (鶴山) or Maruyama (丸山), is a sacred hill in Ayabe, Kyoto Prefecture, Japan. It is a shintaizan (神体山), or physical embodiment of a kami, that is considered by the Oomoto religion to be its primary spiritual center. Mount Hongū is located on the grounds of Baishō-en (梅松苑), a shrine and garden complex which was declared by its founders Nao Deguchi and Onisaburo Deguchi to be the spiritual center of Japan around the turn of the 20th century.

== History and religious significance ==
According to Michi no Shiori,

Oomoto, which reveals the Divine teachings, is the holy place called Ryūgū-yakata (竜宮館; lit."the Ryūgū house") on the grounds of Shingū (神宮) and Hongū (本宮) in Ayabe; it is a Divine garden, where gods gather.

In 1935, a shrine building complex was destroyed by government authorities during the Second Oomoto Incident. The shrine building complex was never rebuilt.

== Geography ==
The main building complexes in Baishō-en (梅松苑) are located at the western and northern base of Mount Hongū. The San'in Main Line and Yura River run along the eastern base of the mountain.

The summit of Mount Hongū is marked by a spherical stone marker.

== See also ==
- Mount Misen (Ayabe)
- Mount Takakuma
