= Sacred mountains =

Mountains central to certain religions

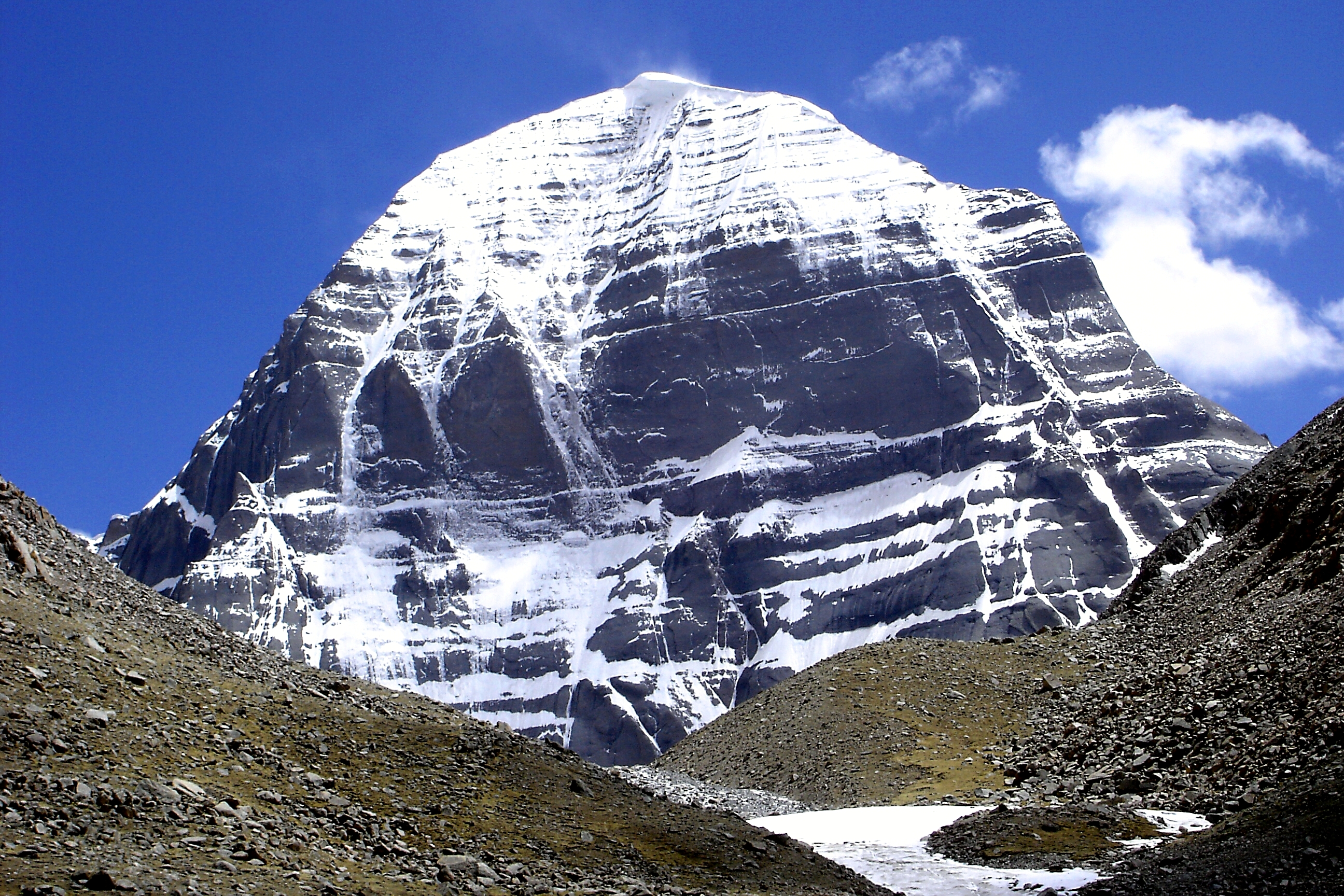
The north face of Mount Kailash, a mountain in the Tibet Autonomous Region of China which is considered sacred by four religions

Sacred mountains are central to certain religions, and are usually the subjects of many legends. For many, the most symbolic aspect of a mountain is the peak because it is believed that it is closest to heaven or other religious realms. Many religions have traditions centered on sacred mountains, which either are or were considered holy (such as Mount Olympus in Greek mythology) or are related to famous events (like Mount Sinai in Judaism and descendant religions or Mount Kailash, Mount Meru in Hinduism). In some cases, the sacred mountain is purely mythical, like the Hara Berezaiti in Zoroastrianism. Mount Kailash is believed to be the abode of the deities Shiva and Parvati, and is considered sacred in four religions: Hinduism, Bon, Buddhism, and Jainism. Volcanoes, such as Mount Etna in Italy, were also considered sacred, Mount Etna being believed to have been the home of Vulcan, the Roman god of fire and the forge.

== Themes of sacrality ==
Edwin Bernbaum, a preeminent scholar of sacred mountains around the world, suggests that although no single, universal theme underlies all sacred mountains across the globe, it is possible to identify certain patterns that help to clarify the principal roles that sacred peaks play in different cultures. Bernbaum identifies the following ten themes expressed through sacred mountains that are particularly widespread in cultures around the world, summarized below. A particular sacred mountain may have one or more of these themes represented in it; some may have nearly all of them.

1. Height: When we look at a mountain the first thing to impress us is usually not its central location, but its height, which evokes an immediate response of wonder and awe. Poised above the surrounding landscape, set in a fluid realm of drifting clouds and flowing sky, its summit appears to float in another world, higher and more perfect than the one in which we dwell.
2. Center: The view of the mountain as the center appears in its most comprehensive form as a central axis linking together the three levels of the cosmos – heaven, earth, and hell or underworld. As the link between heaven earth, and hell, it acts as a conduit of power, the place where sacred energies, both divine and demonic, spew into the world of human existence.
3. Power: Many sacred mountains are revered as places of awesome power manifested in various ways – natural, supernatural, and even political.
4. Deity or abode of deity: As places of power and heavens on high, mountains serve as abodes of gods and goddesses, often situated at the center of the cosmos, world, or region.
5. Temple or place of worship: Mountains often appear in the form of temples housing the deities who reside on or within them. As centers and high places open to the sky, mountains provide altars for making offerings to gods and spirits. Also, mountains may take the form of places of worship, viewed or imagined as shrines, churches, and cathedrals.
6. Paradise or garden: Modern societies share with traditional cultures the widespread view of mountains as sacred gardens and earthly paradises.
7. Ancestors and the dead: Whether revered as heavens or feared as hells, mountains have a widespread and important role as hallowed places of the dead. In many cases, the resemblance of mountains to tombs, which often mimic the shape of hills, make them natural places of burial. In seeing mountains as abodes of the dead, people often regard them as the places from which their ancestors came – or as those ancestors themselves.
8. Identity: As divine ancestors, mountains provide many societies with their identity and cohesiveness.
9. Source: People throughout the world look up to mountains as sources of innumerable blessings, sometimes attributed to the ancestral spirits dwelling within them. For many cultures the most important of these blessings is water. Other blessings that flow from sacred mountains include fertility, health, and well-being, as well as treasures of various kinds.
10. Revelation, transformation, inspiration, and renewal: As places of power, close to heaven, mountains serve as dramatic sites of revelation, transformation, inspiration and renewal. The revelation or vision on a mountain often transforms the person who receives it. Hermits of traditions around the world seek out mountains as places to transform themselves through practices of physical austerity and spiritual contemplation. Poets and mystics have visualized the ascent of the sacred mountain as a symbol of the ultimate pilgrimage, leading to the heights of heaven and the final goal of spiritual realization. For lay people who do not aspire to the supreme heights of spiritual transcendence or enlightenment, mountains serve as places where they can find inspiration and renewal.

== Purpose and use ==
=== Community identity ===
History shows that mountains were commonly part of a complex system of mountain and ancestor worship. Having immortalized fallen brethren in the edifice, the people share a common allegiance with all the other people of a community. The meanings that were etched into the mountain and mound terrain connected the villagers. They were all subject to the same landscape and village history, which were bound together by their cultural significance. The history of ancestors could be told by simply pointing at specific mountains and remembering the stories that were passed down throughout the generations. The worship of ancestors and the mountains were largely inseparable. An interconnected web between history, landscape, and culture was thus formed.

Sacred mountains can also provide an important piece of a culture's identity. Bruno Messerli and Jack Ives write, "The Armenian people regard Mount Ararat, a volcano in eastern Turkey believed to be the site of Noah's Ark in the Bible, to be a symbol of their natural and cultural identity".

=== Pilgrimages ===
As of 2022 Kailash had never been climbed, largely because the idea of climbing the mountain is seen as a major sacrilege. Instead, the worshipful embark on a pilgrimage known as the kora. The kora consists of a 32-mile path that circles the mountain, which typically takes five days with little food and water. Various icons, prayer flags, and other symbols of the four religions that believe Kailash is sacred mark the way. To Buddhists and Hindus, the pilgrimage is considered a major moment in a person's spiritual life. One circuit is believed to erase a lifetime of sin, while 108 circuits is believed to ensure enlightenment.

The Islamic prophet Muhammed is said to have received his first revelation on Mount Noor. The mountains' roles as places of revelation and transformation often serve to attract tourists as much as they do religious pilgrims. However, in some cases, the financial revenue is overlooked and sacred mountains are conserved first due to their role in the community.

Members of the Aetherius Society conduct pilgrimages to 19 mountains around the world that they describe as being "holy mountains".

Mount Tomorr, a holy mountain for Albanians, is one of the most frequented sacred places in Albania. Remarkable annual pilgrimages to this mountain take place during the second half of August.

== By country and region ==
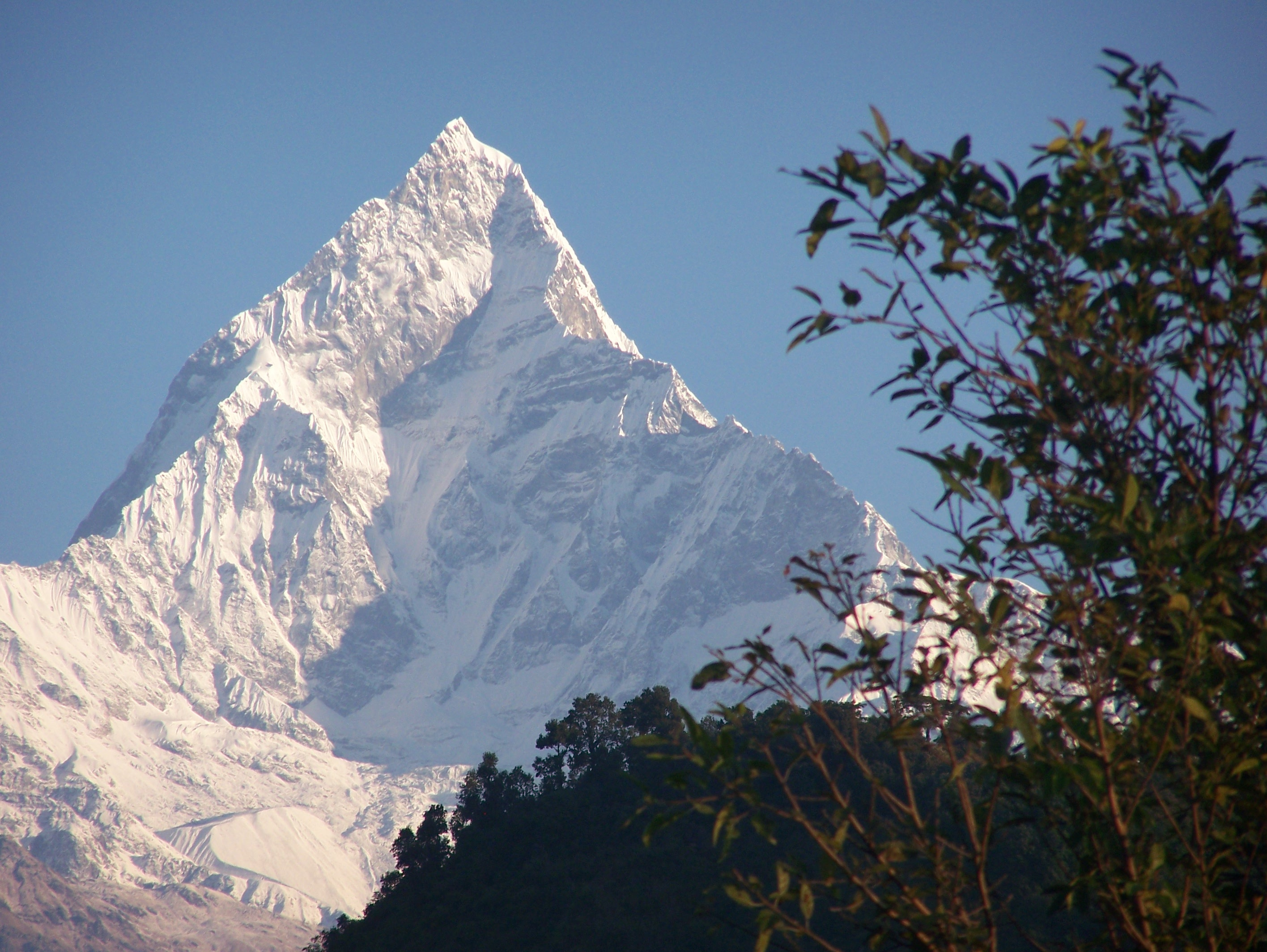
Machapuchare, a sacred Nepalese mountain, viewed from foothills

Various cultures around the world maintain the importance of mountain worship and sacredness. One example is the Taranaki peoples of New Zealand. The Taranaki tribe view Mount Taranaki as sacred. The tribe was historically sustained by this mountain's waterways. As in other instances in Māori mythology, the mountain is anthropomorphized in various stories. For the tribespeople, Mount Taranaki has a deep spiritual significance and is seen as a life force. It is viewed as the place where life is given and to where people are returned after death.

=== Americas ===
Native American people hold numerous mountains as sacred, including the Black Hills in South Dakota, Devils Tower, and Mount Shasta. Pueblo Peak in Taos, New Mexico is also regarded as sacred and is an example of Native Americans regaining their land by utilizing the First Amendment to the US Constitution.

==== Navajo ====
The Navajo possess a strong belief system in regards to the natural-supernatural world and have a belief that objects can have supernatural qualities. For example, the Navajo consider mountains to be sacred. There are four peaks, which are believed to have supernatural aspects. The mountains each represent a borderline of the original Navajo tribal land. The mountain ranges include Mount Taylor, the San Francisco Peaks, Blanca Peak, and Hesperus Peak located in the La Plata Mountains.

Each mountain/peak is representative of a color, direction, and correlates with a cultural light phenomenon dealing with the cosmic scheme of the rising and of the setting sun. Directionally, the mountains are described in a clockwise motion following the movement of the Sun beginning with the eastern mountain of Blanca Peak. Blanca Peak is associated with the color white and the "Dawn Man" referring to the rising of the sun. Next in the south is Mount Taylor, which is associated with the color blue and the "Horizontal Blue Man" referring to the daytime. In the west is the San Francisco Peaks, which is representative of the color yellow and the "Horizontal Yellow Woman" and is associated with the setting of the sun. And finally in the north is the Hesperus Peak of the La Plata Mountains which is given the color black and belongs to the light phenomenon of the "Darkness Woman" representing night-time.

==== Andes ====
The Incas conducted ritual child sacrifices, called Capacochas, on mountain summits for various reasons including for important events in the emperor's life, in response to natural disasters such as droughts and epidemics, and as a preventitive measure to appease local mountain deities. Spanish chroniclers stated that sacrificial victims needed to have an unblemished appearance and be virgins, and that they functioned as messengers from the community to the gods. These sacrifices often would be dedicated to the solar deity Inti, the thunder deity Illapa, the creator god Viracocha, as well as local sacred places called huacas. Patrick Ryan Williams and Donna Nash argue that since these sacrifices presented the Incan Empire as an intermediary for important deities, these sacrifices function to claim natural resources and as a source of legitimization.

The Incans believed that following someone's death, their soul could move from the underworld (which all souls had to endure) to the inside of a mountain. The soul could then progress through the mountain and would be reborn once it reached the peak.

Mountain ancestor deities called apu are venerated by Indigenous people in the Andes. If they are sufficiently ritually "fed" and respected, apu can bestow gifts such as resources, health, and fertility. However, if they are not properly venerated or are injured through actions such as irresponsible underground mining, they can express their pain and anger by causing natural disasters, illnesses, or death. Apu who are not fed through rituals and/or are injured through mining, are belived to in turn "eat" humans who die from illness or accidents near them.

=== Asia ===
==== China ====
In China, many different sets of sacred mountains exist, each associated with a different religious tradition: Taoism and Chinese Buddhism. The sacred mountains have all been important destinations for pilgrimage by laymen, monks and emperors for centuries, with the Chinese expression for pilgrimage (朝圣; 朝聖; cháoshèng) being a shortened version of an expression which means "paying respect to a holy mountain" (朝拜圣山; 朝拜聖山; cháobài shèng shān).

===== Buddhism =====
Chinese Buddhism recognizes four sacred mountains, which are each associated with a specific bodhisattva. They consist of Mount Putuo, Mount Wutai, Mount Jiuhua and Mount Emei. Mount Putuo is associated with the bodhisattva Guanyin and is identified by Chinese Buddhists as the Mount Potalaka mentioned in Buddhist scriptures as being the bodhisattva's bodhimaṇḍa (with the word "Putuo" being a contraction of "Pǔtuóluòjiā", the Mandarin pronunciation of "Potalaka"). Since the Tang dynasty (618–907), the mountain has been the center of Guanyin veneration in China. It is home to more than 30 temples, the most prominent of which are Fayu Temple, Puji Temple and Huiji Temple. Mount Wutai is associated with the bodhisattva Manjusri, who is believed to frequently appear on the mountain, taking the form of ordinary pilgrims, monks, or most often unusual five-colored clouds. It is home to over 360 temples which date back to the Tang dynasty, such as Puhua Temple and Longhua Temple. It is also home to some of the oldest wooden buildings in China that have survived since the era of the Tang dynasty, including the main hall of Nanchan Temple and the East Hall of Foguang Temple, built in 782 and 857, respectively. Mount Jiuhua is associated with the bodhisattva Ksitigarbha. It was identified as the bodhisattva's bodhimaṇḍa after Kim Qiaoque, a prince from the Silla Kingdom on the Korean Peninsula, came there in 719 and cultivated himself for 75 years. After dying, his corporeal body stayed intact. Because he was very similar in appearance to iconography of Ksitigarbha, the monks there believed he was the reincarnation of the bodhisattva. As a result, the mountain came to be associated with Ksitigarbha. During the Ming and Qing dynasties, there were over 360 temples located at the mountain. In contemporary times, the temple is home to over 93 temples, with more than 10,000 Buddha statues. Mount Emei is associated with the bodhisattva Samantabhadra and is the location of the first Buddhist temple built in China in the 1st century CE. It is home to over 76 Buddhist monasteries, most of which were constructed during the Ming dynasty (1368–1644).

===== Taoism =====
Taoism recognizes numerous sacred mountains. Of these, a grouping of five mountains, which are arranged according to the five cardinal directions of Chinese geomancy (which includes the center as a direction), have been regarded as the most important. The grouping of the five mountains appeared during the Warring States period (475 BC – 221 BC), and the term Wuyue ("Five Summits") was made popular during the reign of Emperor Wudi of the Western Han dynasty (140 – 87 BC). In Chinese traditional religion they have cosmological and theological significance as the representation, on the physical plane of earth, of the ordered world emanating from the God of Heaven (Tian–Shangdi), inscribing the Chinese territory as a tán (壇; 'altar'), the Chinese concept equivalent of the Indian mandala. Since the early periods in Chinese history, they have been the ritual sites of imperial worship and sacrifice by various emperors. Mount Tai, which is regarded as the foremost of the five mountains, is believed to be the abode of the Great Deity of Mount Tai (Chinese: 东岳大帝; pinyin: Dōngyuè Dàdì) and is associated with the east, sunrise, birth, and renewal. Religious worship of Mount Tai has a tradition dating back 3,000 years, dating back to the Shang dynasty (c. 1600–1046 BC). By the time of the Zhou dynasty (c. 1046 – 256 BC) sacrifices at Mount Tai had become highly ritualized ceremonies in which a local feudal lord would travel there to make sacrifices of food and jade ritual items. Later, numerous Emperors from various ruling dynasties would continue to hold Taoist ceremonies at the mountain, such as Emperor Gaozong of Tang, whose ceremony was attended by representative from Japan, India, the Persian court in exile, Goguryeo, Baekje, Silla, the Turks, Khotan, the Khmer, and the Umayyad Caliphate. This site is now home to over 22 temples, 97 ruins, 819 stone tablets, and 1,018 cliff-side and stone inscriptions. The other four sacred mountains are: Mount Hua in Shaanxi (associated with the west), Mount Heng in Hunan (associated with the South), Mount Heng in Shanxi (associated with the north), and Mount Song in Henan (associated with the centre). Another famous grouping of sacred Taoist mountains consist of: Mount Longhu, Mount Qiyun, Mount Qingcheng and the Wudang Mountains. In addition, numerous other mountains which are not part of any particular groupings have also been recognized as sacred in Taoism, such as the Kunlun Mountains, which is nicknamed the "Forefather of Mountains" in China and is believed to be the abode of Xiwangmu (Chinese: 西王母; pinyin: Xīwángmǔ), a goddess who is associated with death, warfare, pestilence, shamanism as well as life and immortality.

==== Korea ====
In Korea, people have maintained ancient ways of worshiping mountain spirits. While they are not in fact worshiping the land itself, the gods associated with this worship are united to the land. These spirits are female entities to whom people pay tribute while passing by the mountains, asking for good luck and protection. People also travel to these mountains to ask for fertility. While people generally hold to these female deities for protection or to perpetuate life, one of their most important functions is to protect the dead. The ponhyangsansin is a guardian spirit that is protecting an important clan grave site in the village. Each mountain goddess has an equally interesting story that is tied to their accounts of war against Japan, and the historical legacy of their emperors. Each spirit learned difficult lessons and experienced some sort of hardship. These legacies in the mountains serve as a kind of monument to the history of Korea. While many of the accounts may be true, their details and accuracy are shrouded by time and ritual. While the inaugurations of new ponhyang san sin are not being conducted, fallen important clansmen and leaders are strategically placed in the mountains in order for these strong, heroine-like spirits may fiercely guard their graves. The history of Korea is in turn protecting its own future.

==== Japan ====
In Japan, Mount Kōya is the home to one of the holiest Buddhist monastery complexes in the country. It was founded by a saint, Kukai, who is also known as Kōbō Daishi and is regarded as a famous wandering mystic; his teachings are famous throughout Japan and he is credited with being an important figure in shaping early Japanese culture. Buddhists believe that Kobo Dashi is not dead, but will instead awake and assist in bringing enlightenment to all people, alongside the Buddha and other bodhisattvas. It is believed that he was shown the sacred place to build the monastery by a forest god; this site is now the location of a large cemetery that is flanked by 120 esoteric Buddhist temples. Approximately a million pilgrims visit Mount Kōya a year; these pilgrims have included both royals and commoners who wish to pay their respects to Kobo Dashi. Mount Fuji is another sacred mountain in Japan. Several Shinto temples flank its base, which all pay homage to the mountain. A common belief is that Mount Fuji is the incarnation of the earth spirit itself. The Fuji-kō sect maintains that the mountain is a holy being, and the home to the goddess Sengen-sama. Annual fire festivals are held there in her honor. It is also the site of pilgrimages; reportedly, 40,000 people climb up to its summit every year.

Mountains sacred to Japanese new religions include the following.

- In Honbushin: Mount Kami or Kami-yama (神山) in Okayama
- In Kurozumikyō: Mount Shintō or Shintō-zan (神道山) in Okayama
- In Oomoto: Mount Takakuma or Takakuma-yama (高熊山) in Kameoka and Mount Hongū (本宮山) in Ayabe. Mount Hongu is considered to be a shintaizan (神体山; shintai mountain).
- In Shintō Tenkōkyo: Mount Iwaki or Iwaki-yama (石城山) in Yamaguchi Prefecture
- In Sukyo Mahikari: Mount Kurai. The Inner Shrine (Okumiya) of the World Shrine (世界総本山奥宮) is located on its summit. A memorial complex dedicated to the religion's founders is located near the mountain's base.

==== India ====
In India, especially in Indian-origin religions of Hinduism, Buddhism and Jainism, nature worship is a part of core beliefs, and many mountains and forests are considered sacred. Most sacred among those are Mount Kailash (in Tibet), Nanda Devi, Pamir Mountains as Mount Meru, Mount Mandara, Kanchenjunga, Gangotri Mountain, Yamunotri Mountain, Sarasvotri mountain (origin of Sarasvati River), Dhosi Hill, Tirumala Hills and Simhachalam Hill in Andhra Pradesh, Sabarimala, Arunachala, Garbhagiri mountain, Sapthagiri, Palani, Swamimalai , Tiruttani, Mount Abu, Govardhan Hill, Girnar, Shatrunjaya in Palitana, Osam Jain Hill Patanvav, Taranga Jain temple Hills, Ambaji (Gabbar Hill), Chamundi Hills, Trikuta, Trikut Hill (Trikut Parvat), Mansa Devi Hill Haridwar, Pavagadh Hill, Tosham Hills, Adi Badri in Haryana, etc.

==== Middle East ====
According to the Torah, and consequently the Old Testament of the Bible, Mount Sinai is the location where Moses received the Ten Commandments directly from God. The tablets form the covenant, which is a central cornerstone of Jewish faith. Saint Catherine's Monastery is located at the foot of Sinai. It was founded by empress Helena, who was the mother of the first Christian Roman emperor, Constantine. It was completed under the rule of Justinian two centuries later. The monastery was visited by Muhammed, who blessed it and promised "that it would be cherished by Muslims for all time".

==== Tibet ====
Tibet's Mount Kailash is a sacred place to five religions: Buddhism, Jainism, Hinduism, Bon Po (a native Tibetan religion prior to Buddhism), and Sikhism. According to Hinduism, Mount Kailash is the home of the deity Shiva. In the Hindu religion, Mount Kailash also plays an important role in Rama's journey in the ancient Sanskrit epic, Ramayana. Buddhists hold that Mount Kailash is the home of Samvara, a guardian deity. Buddhists believe that Mount Kailash has supernatural powers that are able to clean the sins of a lifetime of any person. Followers of Jainism believe that Kailash is the site where the founder of Jainism reached enlightenment. Bon Po teaches that Mount Kailash is the home of a wind goddess. Followers of Sikhism believe the 1st Sikh Guru, Guru Nanak arrived at Mount Kailash during the 3rd Uddasi (divine journey) and debated with the siddhas.

Mount Meru is a cosmic mountain which is described to be one of the highest points on Earth and is the centre of all creation in Indian religions. In the Hindu religion, it is believed that Meru is home to the deities Shiva and Parvati. In Indian classical mythology, it is believed that the Sun, Moon, and stars all revolve around Mount Meru. Folklore suggests the mountain rose up from the ground piercing the heavens, giving it the moniker "the navel of the universe".

==== Vietnam ====
In Vietnam, the Ba Vì mountain range is called "the lord of mountains" (núi chúa) in the Vietnamese spirit though it is not the highest mountain range in Vietnam. In addition, there is the Bảy Núi mountain range - a sacred mountain range in Southern Vietnam, considered the place where Maitreya Buddha opened the Hội Long Hoa, the final judgment, ending the hạ ngươn period (the end of the Dharma) and opened a thượng ngươn new life of happiness and peace. An indicator sign is that by that time, from the treasure mountain (Bửu Sơn) will emit a wonderful fragrance (Kỳ Hương).

=== Europe ===
==== Greece ====
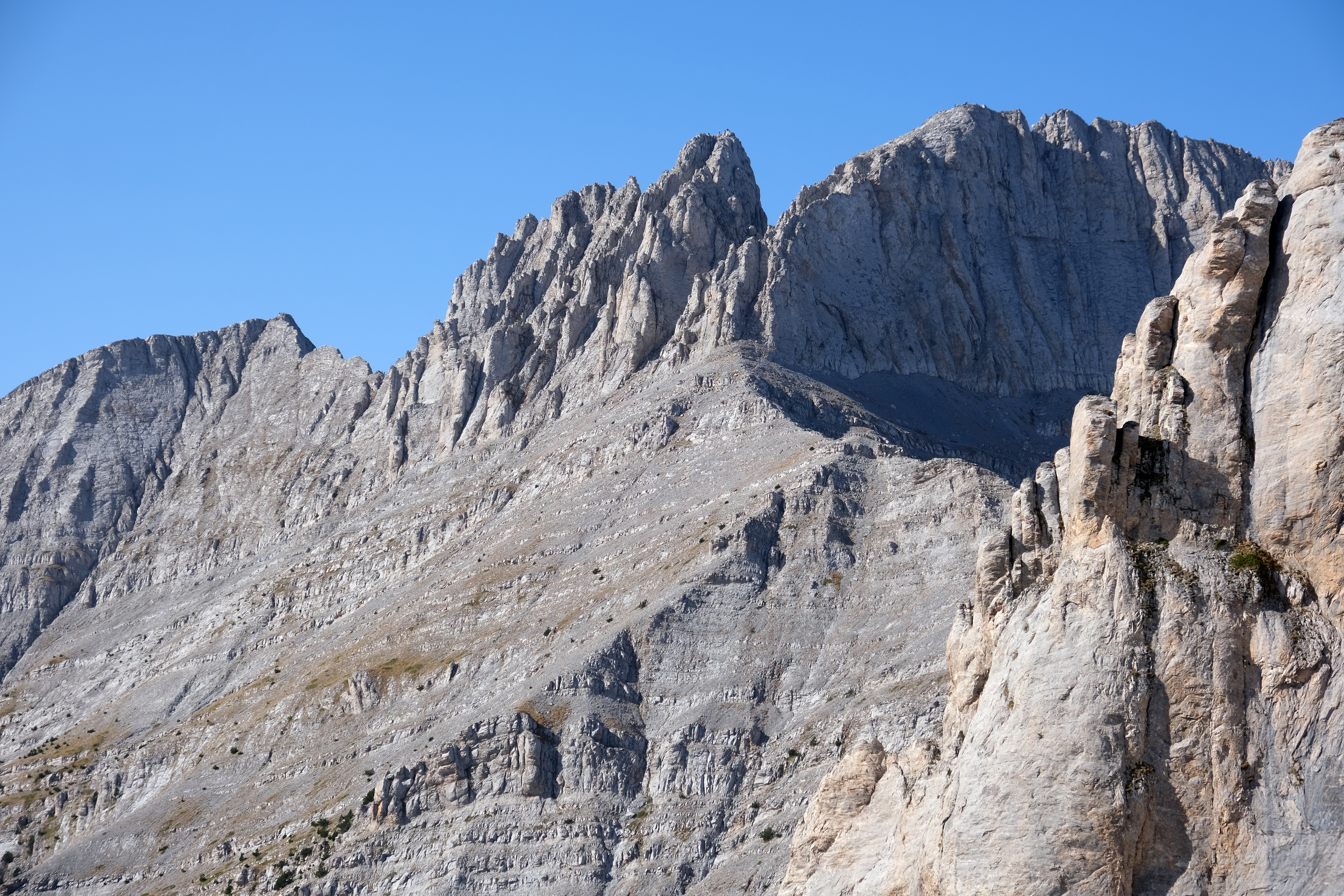
Mount Olympus

Mount Olympus is the highest mountain peak in Greece. It was once regarded as the "home of the Greek Gods/The Twelve Olympians of the Hellenistic World". It was also considered the site of the War of the Titans (Titanomachy) where Zeus and his siblings defeated the Titans. Mount Othrys is a mountain in Central Greece, which is believed to be the home of the Titans during that war.

Mount Ida, also known as Mountain of the Goddess, refers to two specific mountains: one in the Greek island of Crete and the other in Turkey (formerly known as Asia Minor).

Mount Ida is the highest mountain on the island of Crete is the sacred mountain of the Titaness Rhea, also known as the mother of the Greek Gods. It is also believed to be the cave where Greek God Zeus was born and raised.

The other Mount Ida is located in Northwestern Anatolia alongside the ruins of Troy (in reference to the Hellenistic Period). The mountain was dedicated to Cybele, the Phrygian (modern-day Turkey) version of Earth Mother. Cybele was the goddess of caverns and mountains. Some refer to her as the "Great Mother" or "Mother of the Mountain". The mythic Trojan War is said to have taken place at Mount Ida and that the Gods gathered upon the mountaintop to observe the epic fight. Mount Ida in Turkey is also represented in many of the stories of Greek author Homer such as Iliad and Odyssey.

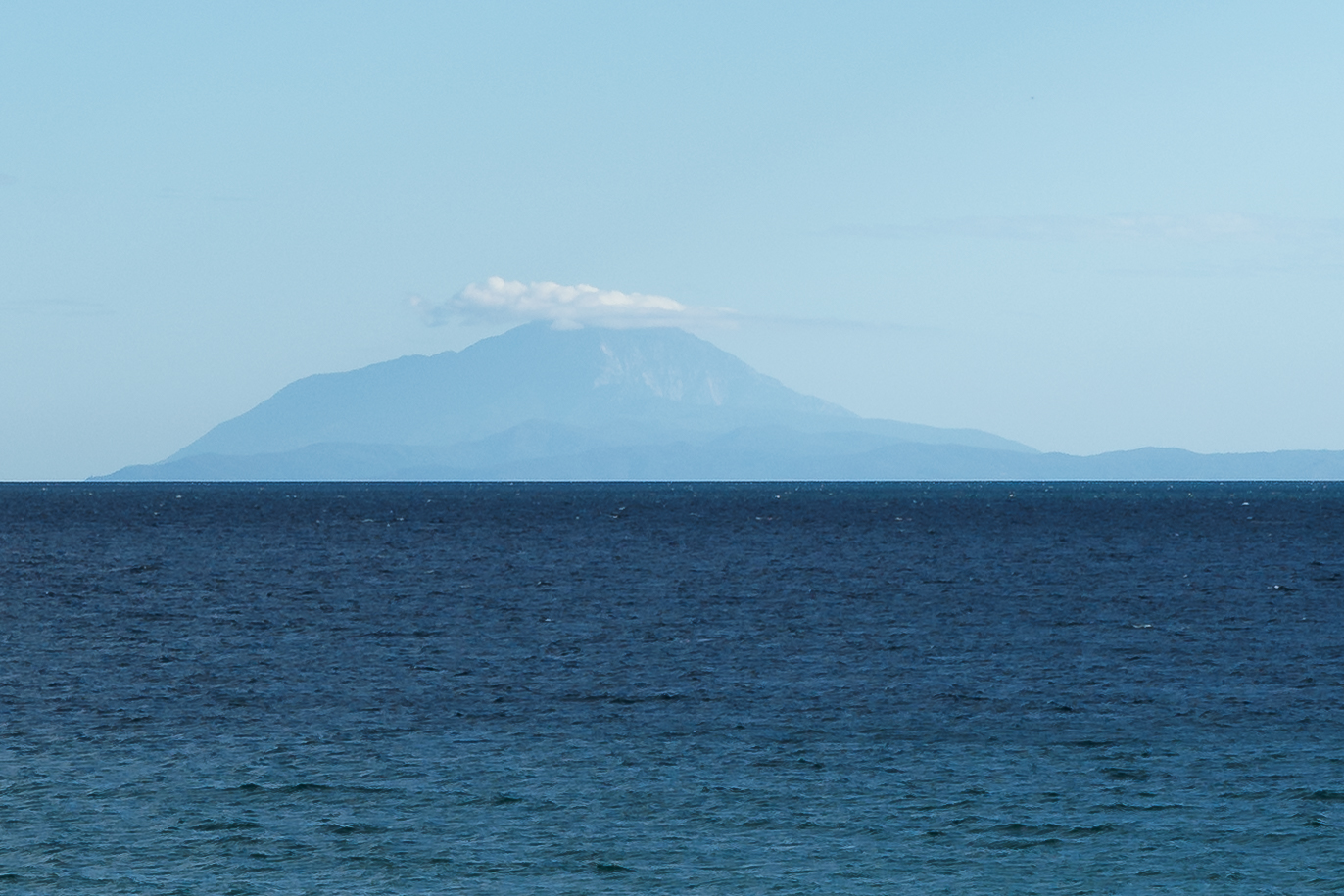
Mount Athos

Mount Athos, located in Greece, is also referred to as the Holy Mountain. It has great historical connections with religion and classical mythology. In Roman Catholic and Eastern Orthodox forms of Christianity, it is believed that after the Ascension of the Lord, the Virgin Mary landed on the island and came upon a pagan temple. It was there that the pagan practitioners converted from paganism to Christianity. The Virgin Mary then blessed the land and claimed it her own.

In classical mythology, Mount Athos is named after the Thracian giant who battled Poseidon, God of the Sea, during the clash of the titans and Gods. It is also said that Greek historian was given the task of creating a canal through the mountain after the failed journey of Persian leader, Xerxes. Over time, Alexander the Great has become associated with the mountain for his worldly powers. The myth states that Greek architect Dinocrates had wanted to carve Alexander the Great's figure onto the top of the mountain in tribute to him.

==== Albania ====
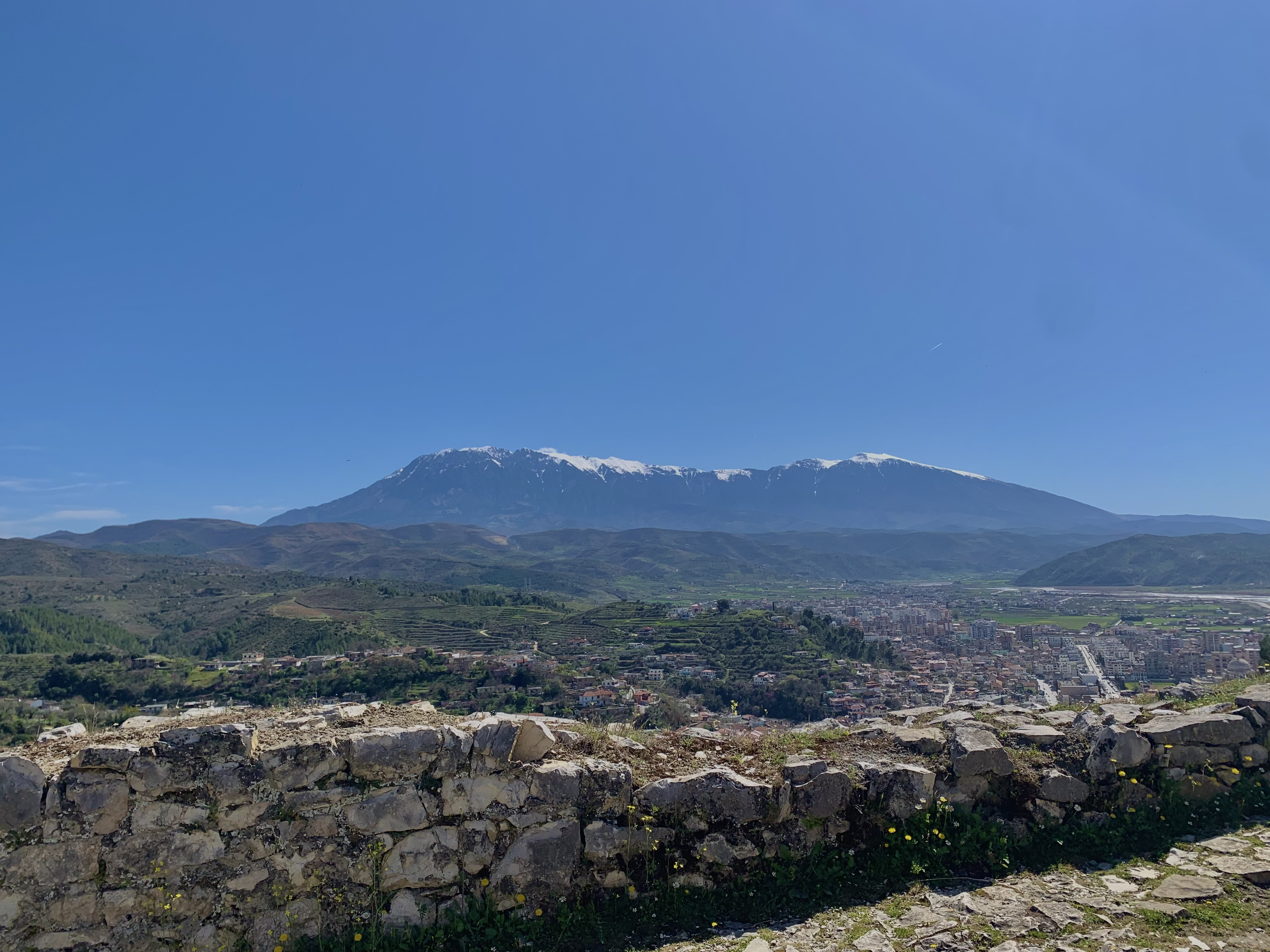
Mount Tomorr, a holy mountain for Albanians, is one of the most frequented sacred places in Albania.

The cult of the mountain and mountain tops is widespread among Albanians. Pilgrimages to sacred mountains take place regularly during the year. This ancient practice is still preserved today, notably in Tomorr, Pashtrik, Lybeten, Gjallicë, Rumia, Koritnik, Shkëlzen, Mount Krujë, Shelbuem, Këndrevicë, Maja e Hekurave, Shëndelli and many others. In Albanian folk beliefs the mountain worship is strictly related to the cult of Nature in general, and the cult of the Sun, the Earth and water in particular. Every mountain is said to have its own nymph (Zana e malit), who get their specific name according to the top of the mountain where the nymphs stay. For instance Mount Pashtrik is the dwelling of Zana e Pashtrikut.

== List of sacred mountains ==
A non-exhaustive alphabetical list of sacred mountains is as follows:

- Aconcagua – Argentina
- Adam's Peak (Sri Pada) – Sri Lanka. The second highest mountain in the country and is regarded as sacred by four religions of Buddhists, Hindus, Christians and native Chinese faith
- Adi Kailash – Uttarakhand, India. Sacred to Hindus
- Mount Agung – Indonesia
- Áhkká – Sweden. Regarded by the Sámi people as a holy mountain
- Mount Akhun – Sochi, Russia. The sacred mountain of Ubykhia
- Mount Aqraa (Zaphon) – Turkey-Syria border
- Mount Ararat – Eastern Anatolia region, Turkey. Highly sacred to Armenians and is alleged to be the site of Noah's Ark. Holy to the Armenian Apostolic Church
- Mount Arayat – Philippines
- Arunachala – Tamil Nadu, India
- Mount Athos – also known as the Holy Mountain, Greece
- Mount Banahaw – Philippines
- Ba Vì mountain range – Vietnam
- Bảy Núi – Vietnam
- Bear Butte – South Dakota, United States
- Black Hills – South Dakota, United States
- Mount Bromo – Indonesia
- Burkhan Khaldun – Mongolia
- Mount Carmel – Israel
- Monte Cavo (Monte Albano) – Italy. Considered sacred by the Ancient Romans
- Ceahlău Massif – Romania. The most important peak is Toaca (1904 m altitude)
- Chandranath Hill – Bangladesh. Sacred for Hindus because of the Chandranath Temple
- Croagh Patrick – Ireland
- Cyclops Mountains – Indonesia
- Dakpa Sheri – Tibet, China
- Mount Damavand – Iran
- Devils Tower – Wyoming, United States
- Mount Diamer – Diamer, Pakistan
- Mount Diwata – Philippines
- Mount Ecclesia – Oceanside, California, United States. A high mesa with a holy solar temple, spiritual healing ceremonies, and a record of spiritual visions
- Emei Shan – Yunnan, China. One of the Four Sacred Buddhist Mountains of China
- Mount Etna – Italy
- Mount Everest – China-Nepal border
- Mount Fuji – Japan
- Gangkhar Puensum - Bhutan
- Girnar Parvat – Gujarat, India. A holy mountain for Hindus and Jains
- Gyeryongsan – South Korea
- Kinnaur Kailash – Himachal Pradesh, India. Sacred to Hindus and local Buddhists
- Khan Tengri – sacred in Turko-Mongolic cultures.
- Musala – sacred to early Tengrist Bulgars and later to Muslim Turks.
- Harmukh – Jammu and Kashmir, India. Sacred to Hindus
- Huang Shan (Yellow Mountain(s)) – China
- Mount Mahadev – Jammu and Kashmir, India. Sacred to Kashmiri Hindus
- Hua Shan – China. The "Western Mountain" of the Five Great Mountains of China
- Mount Iwaki – Yamaguchi Prefecture, Japan. Sacred to the Shintō Tenkōkyo religion
- Jirisan – South Korea
- Mount Kailash – Tibet, China. Sacred to Hinduism, Buddhism, Jainism and Bön
- Mount Kami – Okayama, Japan. Sacred to the Honbushin religion
- Mount Kenya – Kenya, traditionally sacred to the Kikuyu people in Kenya
- Mount Kilimanjaro – Tanzania. Sacred to the Chaga people who believe god Ruwa resides on the top
- Mount Kinabalu (Aki Nabalu) – Malaysia. Sacred to the Kadazan-Dusun people of Sabah
- Mount Kurai – Takayama, Gifu, Japan. Sacred to the Sukyo Mahikari religion
- Mount Lantoy – Philippines
- Mount Lao – China. Culturally significant due to its long affiliation with Taoism and is often regarded as one of the "cradles of Taoism"
- Machu Picchu, Huayna Picchu, and other mountains were sacred to the Inca locals
- Mount Makiling – Philippines
- Mauna Loa/Mauna Kea – Hawaii, United States. Volcanic eruptions were thought to be a result from the Hawaiian Goddess of fire Pele (deity) when in argument with her siblings
- Medicine Mountain – Wyoming, United States
- Mount Merapi – Indonesia
- Montserrat – Spain
- Mount Murud – Malaysia. Highest mountain in Sarawak. Sacred to Lun Bawang people in their Christian faith
- Mount Mutis - Indonesia
- Nanda Devi – India
- Nevado Ojos del Salado – Chile-Argentina border. Highest volcano on Earth and the highest peak in Chile
- Jabal al-Nour – Saudi Arabia
- Odaesan – South Korea
- Mount of Olives – Jerusalem, Israel/Palestine
- Mount Olympus – Greece
- Paektu Mountain – North Korea-China border. Sacred to all Koreans, also a subject of the North Korean cult of personality
- Parasnath Shikharji – one of the holiest Jain pilgrim sites in India
- Phnom Kulen – Cambodia
- Mount Rainier – Washington state, United States. Decade volcano sacred to indigenous tribes to it being a "mother's breast" that nourishes the land with fresh water
- Mount Rinjani – Indonesia
- Mount Roraima – Brazil-Guyana-Venezuela border
- Mount San Cristobal – The Philippines
- Mount Sahand – Iran
- Semeru – Indonesia
- Seshachalam Hills – India, sacred in Hinduism as the Venkateswara Temple is located here
- Shrikhand Mahadev – Himachal Pradesh, India. Sacred to Hindus
- Mount Shasta – California, United States
- Mount Sinai – Egypt
- Mount Sinjar – Iraq, sacred to the Yazidis
- Srisailam
- Sulayman Mountain – Kyrgyzstan
- Mount Tabor – Israel
- Taebaeksan – South Korea
- Takht-e-Sulaiman – Pakistan. Significant in Pashtun mythology
- Tai Shan – China. The eastern mountain of the Sacred Mountains of China
- Mount Terich Mir – Chitral, Pakistan. Significant in Chitrali folklore
- Jabal Thawr – Saudi Arabia. The mountain cave where Muhammad and his companion Abu Bakr hid from Quraish during migration to Medina
- Mount Takakuma – Kameoka, Kyoto, Japan. Sacred to the Oomoto religion
- Mount Taranaki – New Zealand
- Teide – Tenerife, Canary Islands, Spain. Sacred to the aboriginal Guanches
- Temple Mount – Jerusalem, Israel/Palestine
- Mount Tomorr – Albania
- Uluru (Ayers Rock) – Northern Territory, Australia
- Velliangiri – India
- Mount Vesuvius – Italy
- Villarrica – Chile
- Wudang Shan – China. One of the "Four Sacred Mountains of Taoism" in China
- Mount Zion – Jerusalem, Israel/Palestine

== Conservation ==
Sacred mountains often have restricted access. Climbing has been banned from Mount Kailash, the source of four major rivers in India, which are also protected from pollution.

A large forest has been preserved due to its proximity to Mount Kōya-san.

In the Sacramento Valley in the United States, Shasta Mountain was first revered by the Native American tribe, the Wintu. The Wintu tribe has voiced concerns and asked for support from the government to regulate the activities practiced on the mountain, saying that "they are disturbed by the lack of respect" shown for the piece of land. There is an ongoing debate on whether the more vulnerable and "spiritually desirable" places of the mountain should be closed and maintained only by the Wintu tribe, who see this land as a sacred graveyard of their ancestors, or open to all who seek spiritual fulfillment such as the modern-day group of the I AM.

== See also ==
- Sacred related
  - Sacred groves
    - Bodhi Tree
    - Largest Banyan trees
    - Sacred groves of India
    - Sacred trees
    - Trees in mythology
    - Tree worship
  - Sacred natural site
  - Sacred rivers
  - Sacred site
- Hills and mountains in Meitei culture
- General
  - List of types of formally designated forests
  - Superlative trees
  - Tree hugger (disambiguation)
  - World mountain
- Ivory tower
