= Mount Takakuma =

Sacred mountain in Kameoka, Kyoto, Japan

Mount Takakuma (高熊山)
- Mount Chōzuka (丁塚山)
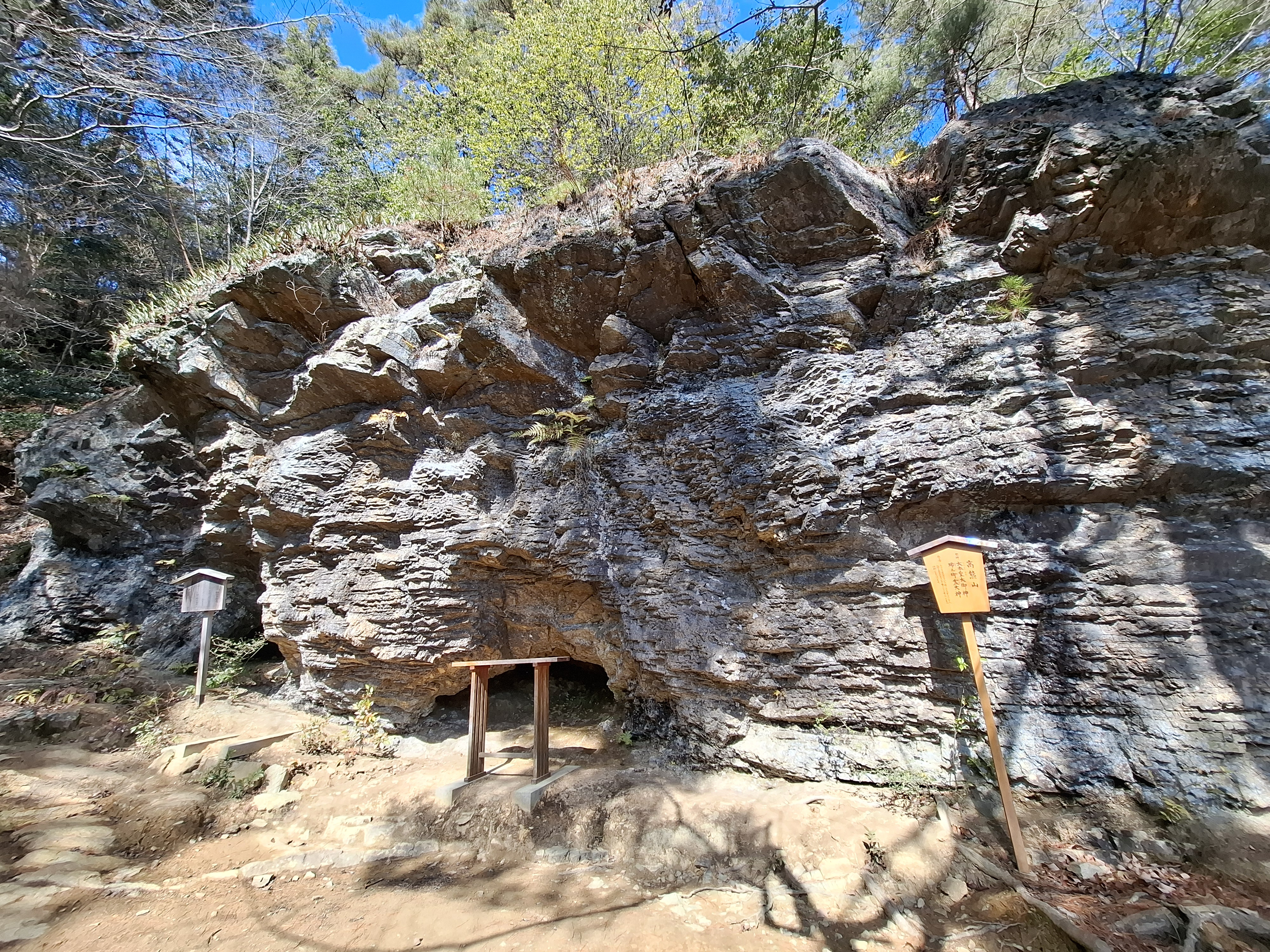
- The Cave of Onisaburo Deguchi on Mount Takakuma

Highest point
- Elevation: 357 m (1,171 ft)
- Coordinates: 35°0′22″N 135°31′47″E

Geography
- Location: Kameoka, Kyoto Prefecture, Japan

Climbing
- Easiest route: Hiking

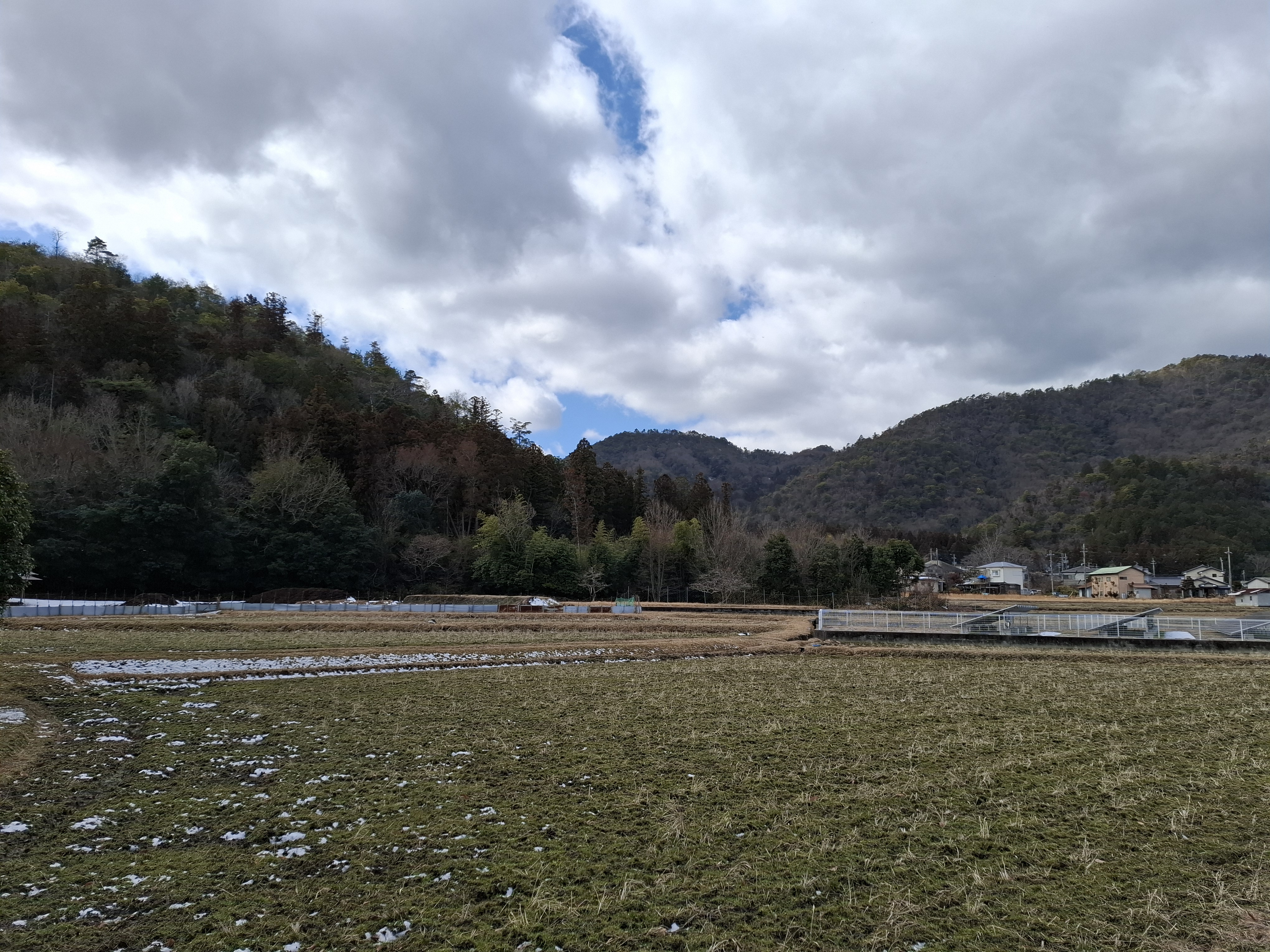
View towards Mount Takakuma from Anao village, Kameoka

Mount Takakuma (高熊山, Takakuma-yama) (lit. 'tall bear mountain') is a sacred mountain in Anao (穴太), Kameoka, Kyoto Prefecture, Japan. According to signs on the mountain, it is located between the peaks of Mount Chōzuka (丁塚山, Chōzuka-yama) and Mount Oku (奥山, Oku-yama), although some maps and sources identify Mount Takakuma with Mount Chōzuka.

== History ==
According to Chapter 1 in Volume 1 of the Reikai Monogatari by Onisaburo Deguchi:

Mt. Takakuma (高熊山 "High Bear") was originally named Mt. Takamikura (高御座山 "Imperial Throne") in ancient times and later called Mt. Takakura (高座 "High Throne") or Mt. Takakura (高倉 "High Storehouse") and finally corrupted to Mt. Takakuma (高熊山 "High Bear"). It is a hill in the mountain recesses of Anao 穴太, a village in the Tamba region of Kyoto, and in olden days was the former site of Obata Shrine 小幡神社 dedicated to Emperor Kaika with its status officially recognized in the Engi-shiki. It is also a sacred mount with village seniors' legend that when Emperor Buretsu tried to pick his successor, the Prince of Anao hid himself in Mt. Takakura and spent the rest of his life there, and that not knowing the prince's whereabouts by any means, Emperor Buretsu had no choice but to scout around for a descendant of the imperial family and abdicate the throne in favor of his pick named Emperor Keitai.

== Religious site ==
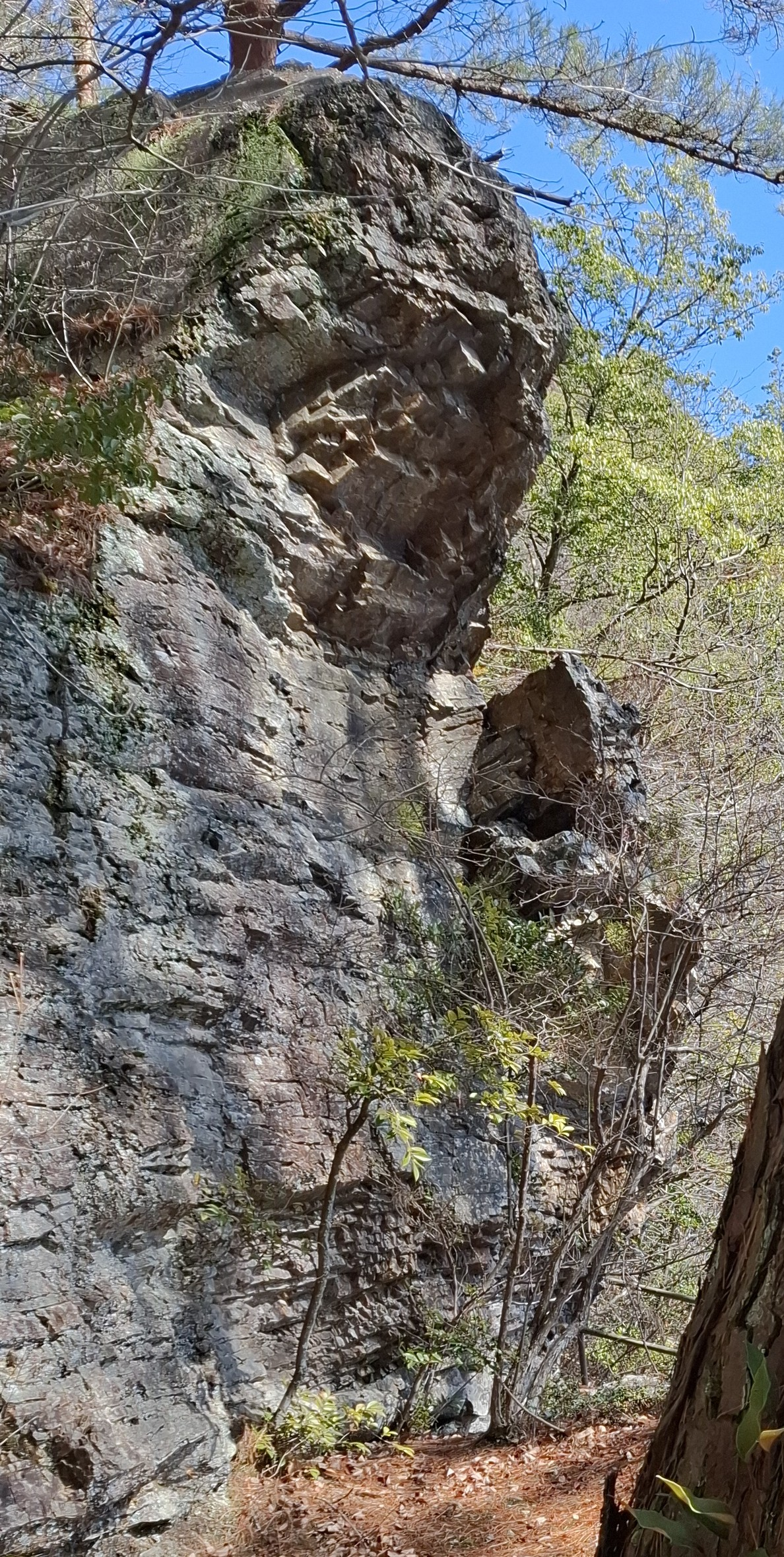
Gama-iwa ガマ岩 ("Toad Rock 蟇岩"), a sacred rock formation located to the right of the Cave of Onisaburo Deguchi. The rock is mentioned in the Reikai Monogatari.

Mount Takakuma is one of the most sacred sites of the Oomoto religion. Oomoto's co-founder Onisaburo Deguchi received divine revelations on Mount Takakuma while performing ascetic training for one week during March 1–7, 1898 (lunar calendar dates: February 9–15, 1898); Deguchi's experience on the mountain were recorded in the first chapter of the Reikai Monogatari. Oomoto followers regularly organize pilgrimages to the cave on Mount Takakuma where Deguchi received his divine revelations. After three months, Deguchi returned again to perform ascetic training for two weeks, as mentioned at the beginning of Chapter 37 of the Reikai Monogatari. In early summer of 1902, he returned again for the third time to train.

Pilgrimages are organized on the 12th day of each month, except during the four months when seasonal grand festivals (大祭, taisai) are held.

Gama-iwa ガマ岩 ("Toad Rock 蟇岩") is a sacred rock formation located just to the right of the Cave of Onisaburo Deguchi. The rock is mentioned in the Reikai Monogatari (Book 1, Chapter 14 and Book 7, Chapter 50).

== Access ==
The mountain can be accessed via a path that begins near Obata Shrine (小幡神社). Onisaburo's cave is located on the southern side of the mountain, below the summit.

== See also ==
- Katabasis
- Mount Hongū (Ayabe)
- Mount Misen (Ayabe)

Mountains in other religions where divine revelations were received:

- Mount Sinai in Abrahamic religions
- Jabal al-Nour in Islam
  - Cave of Hira
