= Fuchigaki Station =

Railway station in Ayabe, Kyoto Prefecture, Japan

Fuchigaki Station 淵垣駅
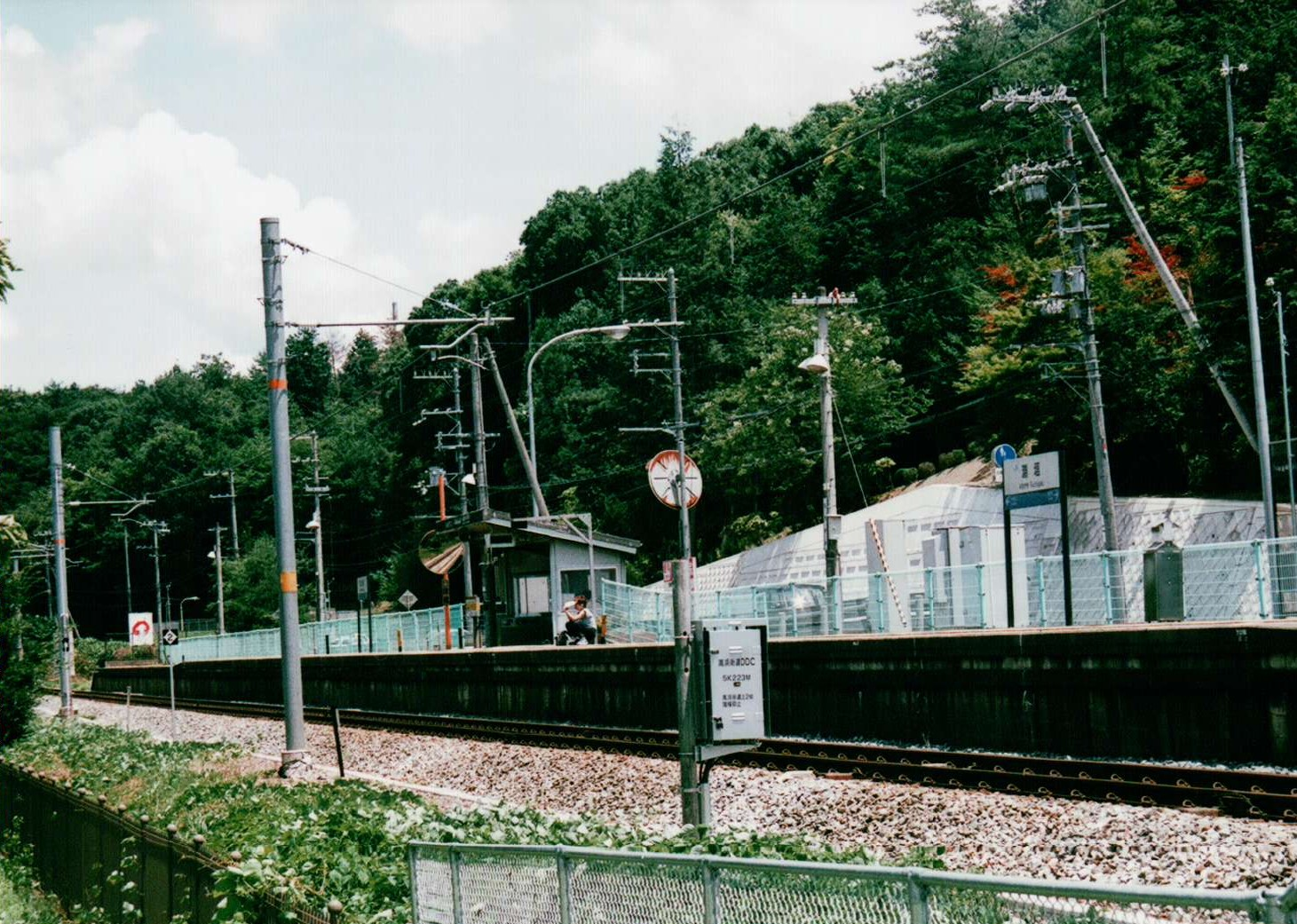
- Fuchigaki Station, July 2007

General information
- Location: Hayashinoshita Fuchigakicho, Ayabe-shi, Kyoto-fu 623-0115; Japan
- Coordinates: 35.3284°N 135.2945°E
- Owner: West Japan Railway Company
- Operator: West Japan Railway Company
- Line: L Maizuru Line
- Distance: 5.3 km (3.3 miles) from Ayabe
- Platforms: 1 side platform
- Connections: Bus stop

Other information
- Status: Unstaffed
- Website: Official website

History
- Opened: 29 March 1960

Passengers
- FY 2023: 376 daily
Location
- Location within Kyoto Prefecture Location within Japan

Fuchigaki Station (淵垣駅, Fuchigaki-eki) is a passenger railway station in located in the city of Ayabe, Kyoto Prefecture, Japan, operated by West Japan Railway Company (JR West).

== Lines ==
Fuchigaki Station is served by the Maizuru Line, and is located 5.3 kilometers from the terminus of the line at Ayabe.

== Station layout ==
The station consists of one ground-level side platform serving single bi-directional track. There is no station building, but only a shelter on the platform. The station is unattended.

== Adjacent stations ==
«	Service	»
Miyazu Line
Ayabe	Local	Umezako

== History ==
Fuchigaki Station opened on March 29, 1960. With the privatization of the Japan National Railways (JNR) on April 1, 1987, the station came under the aegis of the West Japan Railway Company.

== Passenger statistics ==
In fiscal 2016, the station was used by an average of 167 boarding passengers daily.

== Surrounding area ==
- OMRON Ayabe Office
- Ayabe Country Club
- Ayabe Industrial Park
- Ayabe City Industrial Park

== See also ==
- List of railway stations in Japan
