= Magura Station =

Railway station in Maizuru, Kyoto Prefecture, Japan

Magura Station 真倉駅
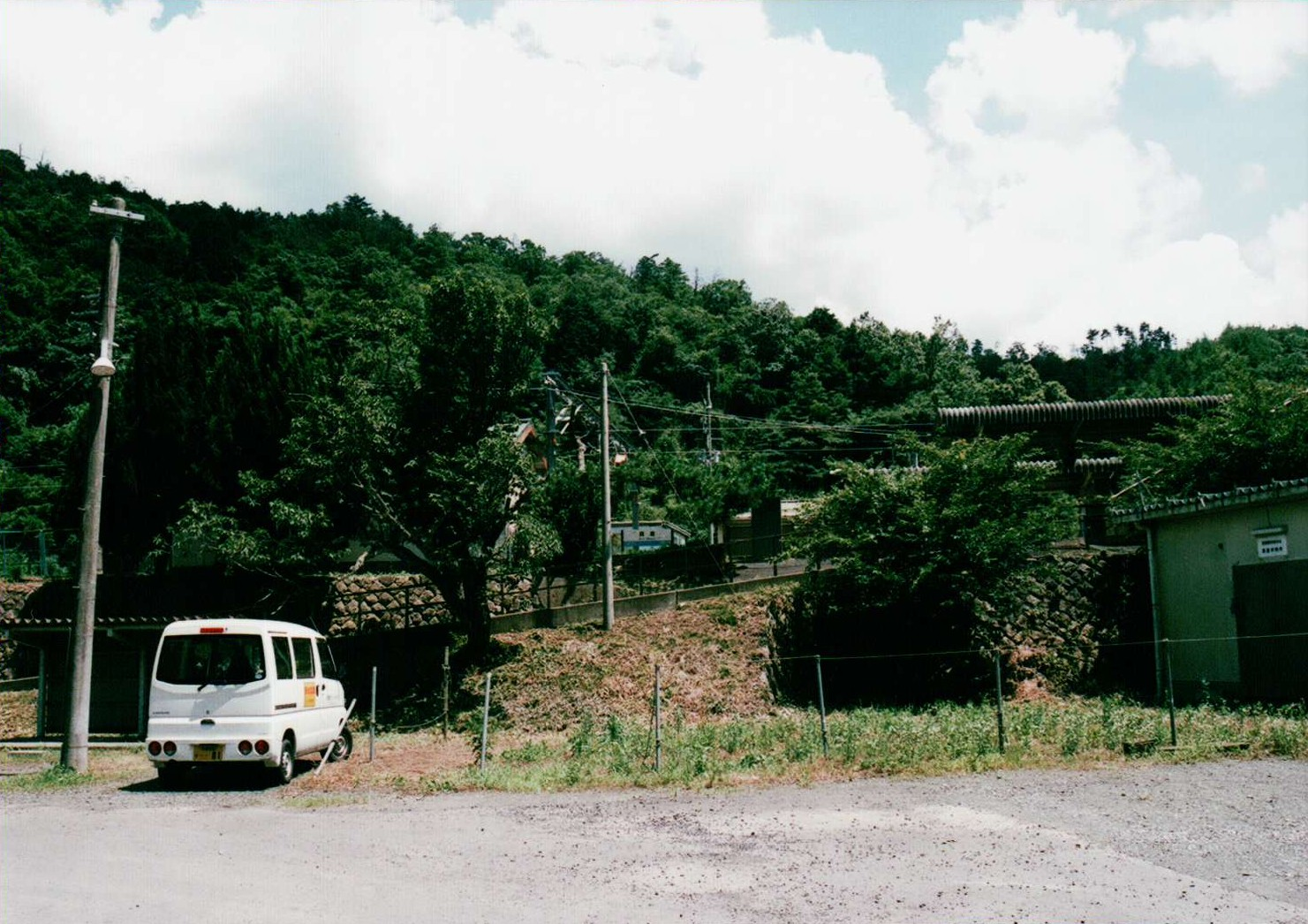
- Magura Station, July 2010

General information
- Location: Magura, Maizuru-shi, Kyoto-fu 624-0824; Japan
- Coordinates: 35.4070°N 135.3263°E
- Owner: West Japan Railway Company
- Operator: West Japan Railway Company
- Line: L Maizuru Line
- Distance: 15.1 km (9.4 miles) from Ayabe
- Platforms: 2 side platforms
- Connections: Bus stop

Other information
- Status: Unstaffed
- Website: Official website

History
- Opened: 1 September 1951

Passengers
- FY 2023: 28 daily
Location
- Location within Kyoto Prefecture Location within Japan

Magura Station (真倉駅, Magura-eki) is a passenger railway station in located in the city of Maizuru, Kyoto Prefecture, Japan, operated by West Japan Railway Company (JR West).

== Lines ==
Magura Station is served by the Maizuru Line, and is located 15.5 kilometers from the terminus of the line at Ayabe.

== Station layout ==
The station consists of two opposed side platform; each platform has a separate exit and passengers wishing to change platforms must exit the station. The station is unattended.

=== Platforms ===
1	■ L Maizuru Line	for Nishi-Maizuru and Higashi-Maizuru
2	■ L Maizuru Line	for Ayabe and Fukuchiyama

== Adjacent stations ==
«	Service	»
Maizuru Line
Umezako	Local	Nishi-Maizuru

== History ==
Magura Station opened on September 1, 1951. With the privatization of the Japan National Railways (JNR) on April 1, 1987, the station came under the aegis of the West Japan Railway Company.

== Passenger statistics ==
In fiscal 2016, the station was used by an average of 25 passengers daily (boarding passengers only)

== Surrounding area ==
- Shitakeyama Kyokogataki Fudo Myoo
- Kyoto Prefectural Maizuru Support School

== See also ==
- List of railway stations in Japan
