= Umezako Station =

Railway station in Ayabe, Kyoto Prefecture, Japan

Umezako Station 梅迫駅
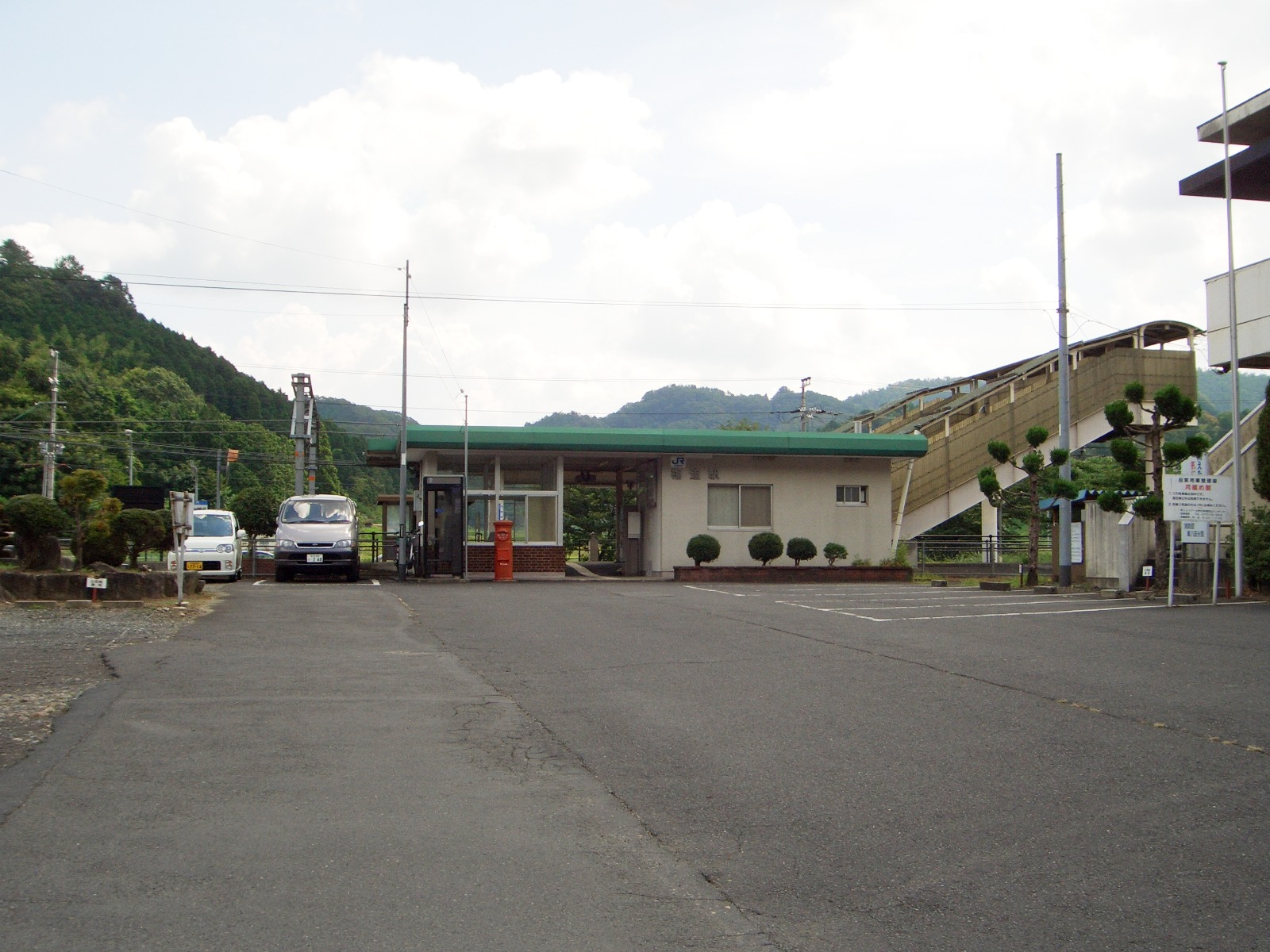
- Umezako Station, August 2008

General information
- Location: 1-1 Misoshiri Umezakocho, Ayabe; Kyoto Prefecture; Japan
- Coordinates: 35.3486°N 135.3112°E
- Owner: JR West
- Operator: JR West
- Line: L Maizuru Line
- Distance: 8.2 km (5.1 miles) from Ayabe
- Platforms: 2 (2 side platforms)
- Connections: Bus stop

Other information
- Status: Unstaffed
- Website: Official website

History
- Opened: 3 November 1904; 121 years ago

Passengers
- FY 2023: 98 daily
Location
- Location within Kyoto Prefecture Location within Japan

Umezako Station (梅迫駅, Umezako-eki) is a passenger railway station in located in the city of Ayabe, Kyoto Prefecture, Japan, operated by JR West.

== Lines ==
Umezako Station is served by the Maizuru Line, and is located 8.2 kilometers from the terminus of the line at Ayabe.

== Station layout ==
The station consists of two ground-level opposed side platforms connected by a footbridge. The station is unattended.

=== Platforms ===
1	■ L Maizuru Line	for Nishi-Maizuru and Higashi-Maizuru
2	■ L Maizuru Line	for Ayabe and Fukuchiyama

== Adjacent stations ==
«	Service	»
Maizuru Line
Fuchigaki	Local	Magura

== History ==
Umezako Station opened on November 3, 1904. With the privatization of the Japan National Railways (JNR) on April 1, 1987, the station came under the aegis of the West Japan Railway Company.

== Passenger statistics ==
In fiscal 2016, the station was used by an average of 90 passengers daily (boarding passengers only)

== Surrounding area ==
- Japan National Route 27
- Ankoku-ji

== See also ==
- List of railway stations in Japan
