= Ayabe, Kyoto =

Ayabe 綾部市
- City
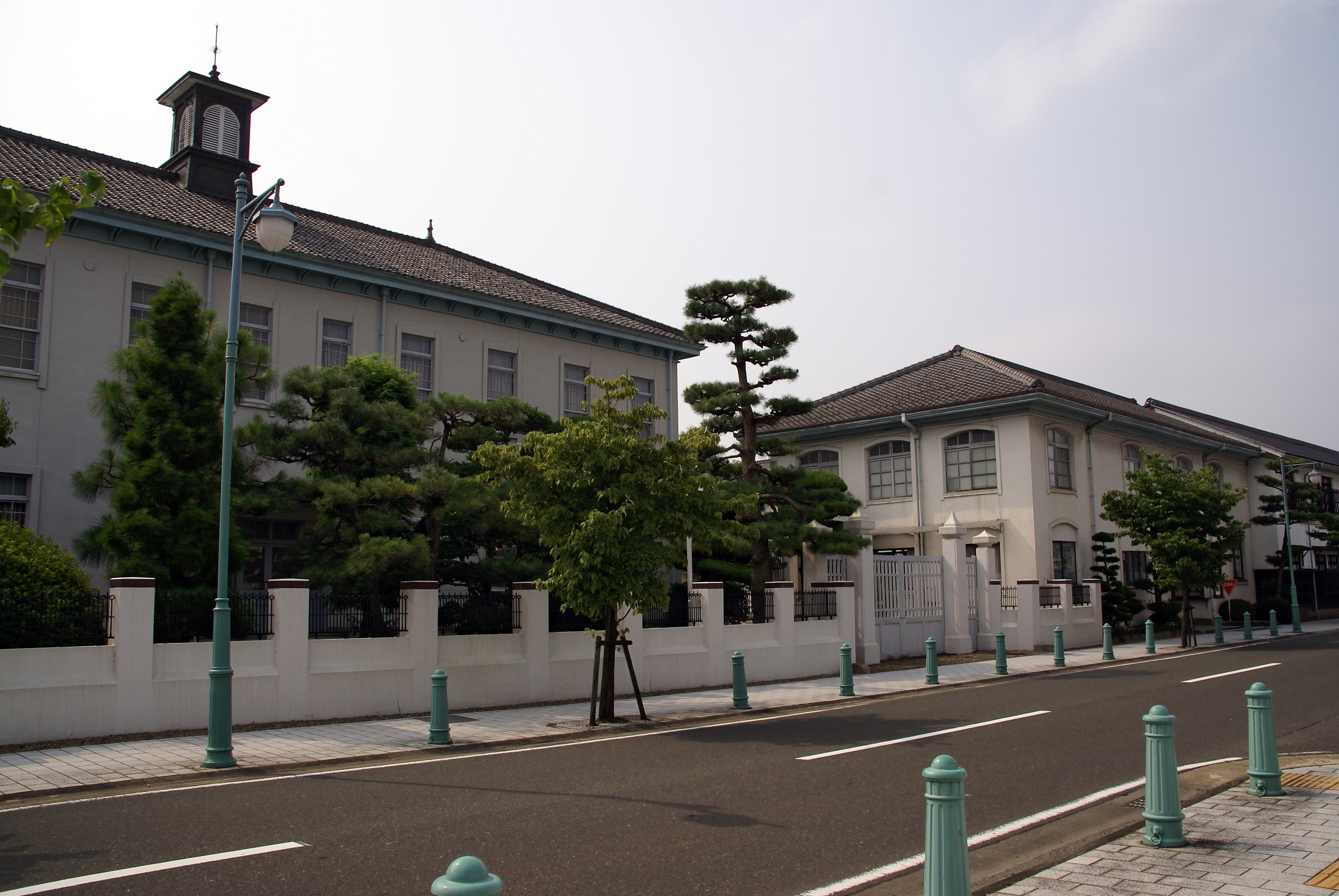
- Gunze memorial hall

- Flag Emblem

- Location of Ayabe in Kyoto Prefecture

- Location in Japan
- Coordinates: 35°18′N 135°16′E
- Country: Japan
- Region: Kansai
- Prefecture: Kyoto
- First official recorded: 471 AD
- Town settled: April 1, 1889
- City settled: August 1, 1950

Government
  - Mayor: Gentarō Shikata (四方源太郎) - from February 2026

Area
  - Total: 347.10 km^{2} (134.02 sq mi)

Population (March 31, 2022)
  - Total: 31,082
  - Density: 89.548/km^{2} (231.93/sq mi)
- Time zone: UTC+09:00 (JST)
- City hall address: 1-8 Wakatakecho, Ayabe-shi, Kyoto-fu 623-8501
- Climate: Cfa
- Website: Official website
- Symbols
- Bird: Japanese grosbeak
- Flower: ume
- Tree: Pine

Ayabe (綾部市, Ayabe-shi; Japanese pronunciation: [ä́.jä̀.bè̞, ä̀.jä́.bé̞.ɕì]) is a city located in Kyoto Prefecture, Japan. As of 31 March 2022, the city had an estimated population of 31,082 in 13,660 households and a population density of 90 persons per km^{2}. The total area of the city is 347.10 square kilometres (134.02 sq mi).

== Geography ==
Ayabe is situated in the mountains of Northern Kyoto Prefecture, with the Yura River flowing through the center of the city.

=== Climate ===
Ayabe has a humid subtropical climate (Köppen Cfa) characterized by warm summers and cool winters with light to no snowfall. The average annual temperature in Ayabe is 13.5 °C. The average annual rainfall is 1639 mm with September as the wettest month. The temperatures are highest on average in August, at around 25.4 °C, and lowest in January, at around 2.3 °C.

=== Neighbouring municipalities ===
- Fukui Prefecture
  - Ōi
  - Takahama
- Kyoto Prefecture
  - Fukuchiyama
  - Kyōtanba
  - Maizuru
  - Nantan

=== Mountains ===
Sacred mountains in Ayabe include:

- Mount Hongū
- Mount Misen

== History ==
Ayabe is part of ancient Tanba Province. Per the Nihon Shoki and other historical sources, the area was settled during the Kofun period by the Hata clan, immigrants from mainland Asia who brought with the technology of sericulture and weaving. In the Heian period, the area was developed into a number of shōen landed estates by the Five regent houses in Kyoto. In the Sengoku period, the area came under the control of Akechi Mitsuhide, and in the Edo Period, it was the center of Ayabe Domain and the small Yamaga Domain. After the Meiji restoration, the town of Ayabe was established within Ikaruga District, Kyoto on April 1, 1889 with the creation of the modern municipalities system. It was raised to city status on August 1, 1950, and the city borders expanded in 1955 and 1956 to encompass all of former Ikaruga District.

== Demographics ==
Per Japanese census data, the population of Ayabe has declined steadily over the past 60 years.

Historical population
Year	Pop.	±%
1960	51,258	—
1970	44,983	−12.2%
1980	42,552	−5.4%
1990	40,595	−4.6%
2000	38,881	−4.2%
2010	35,836	−7.8%
2020	31,846	−11.1%

== Government ==
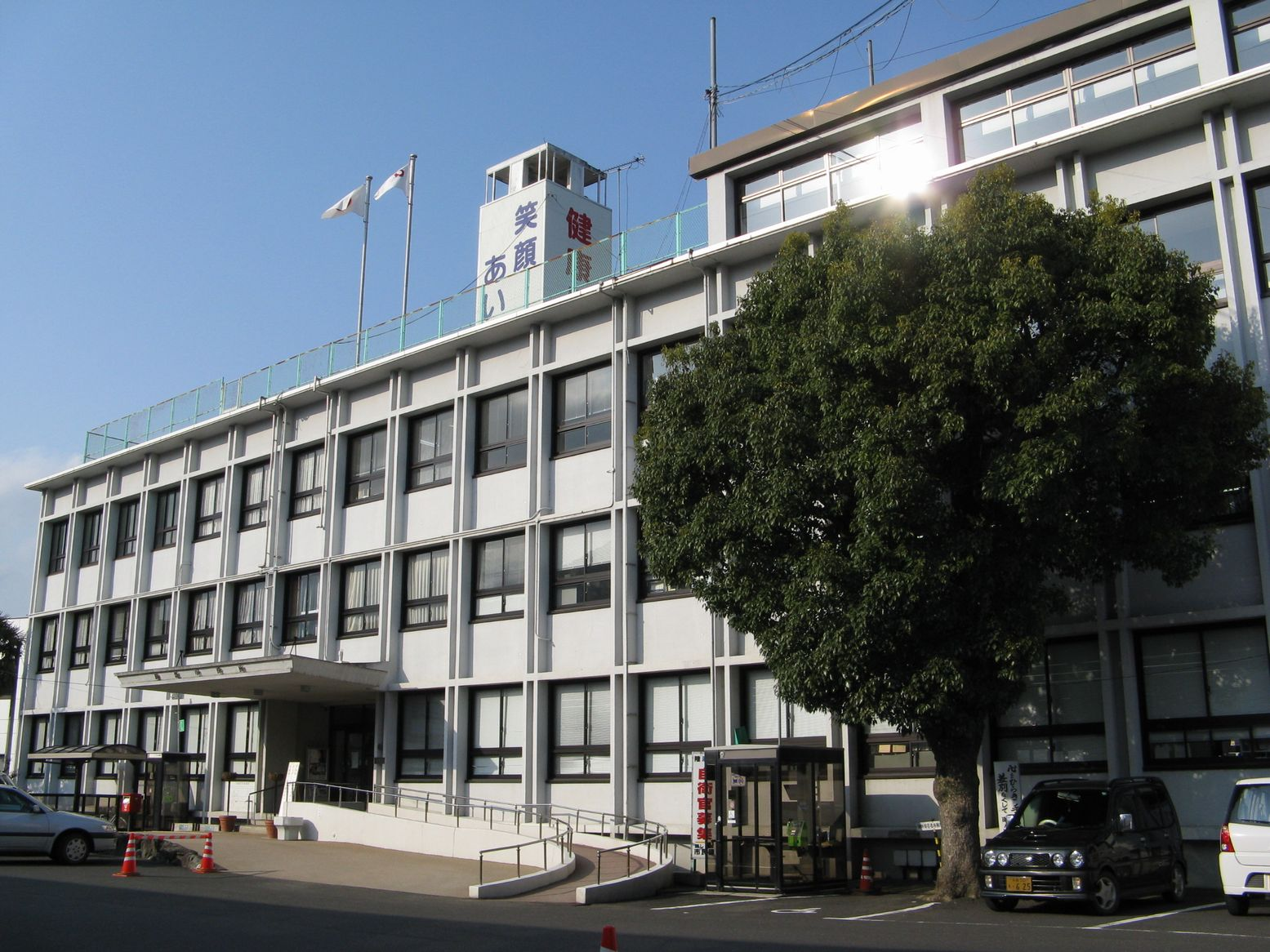
Ayabe City Hall

Ayabe has a mayor-council form of government with a directly elected mayor and a unicameral city council of 18 members. Ayabe contributes one member to the Kyoto Prefectural Assembly. In terms of national politics, the city is part of the Kyoto 5th district of the lower house of the Diet of Japan.

== Economy ==
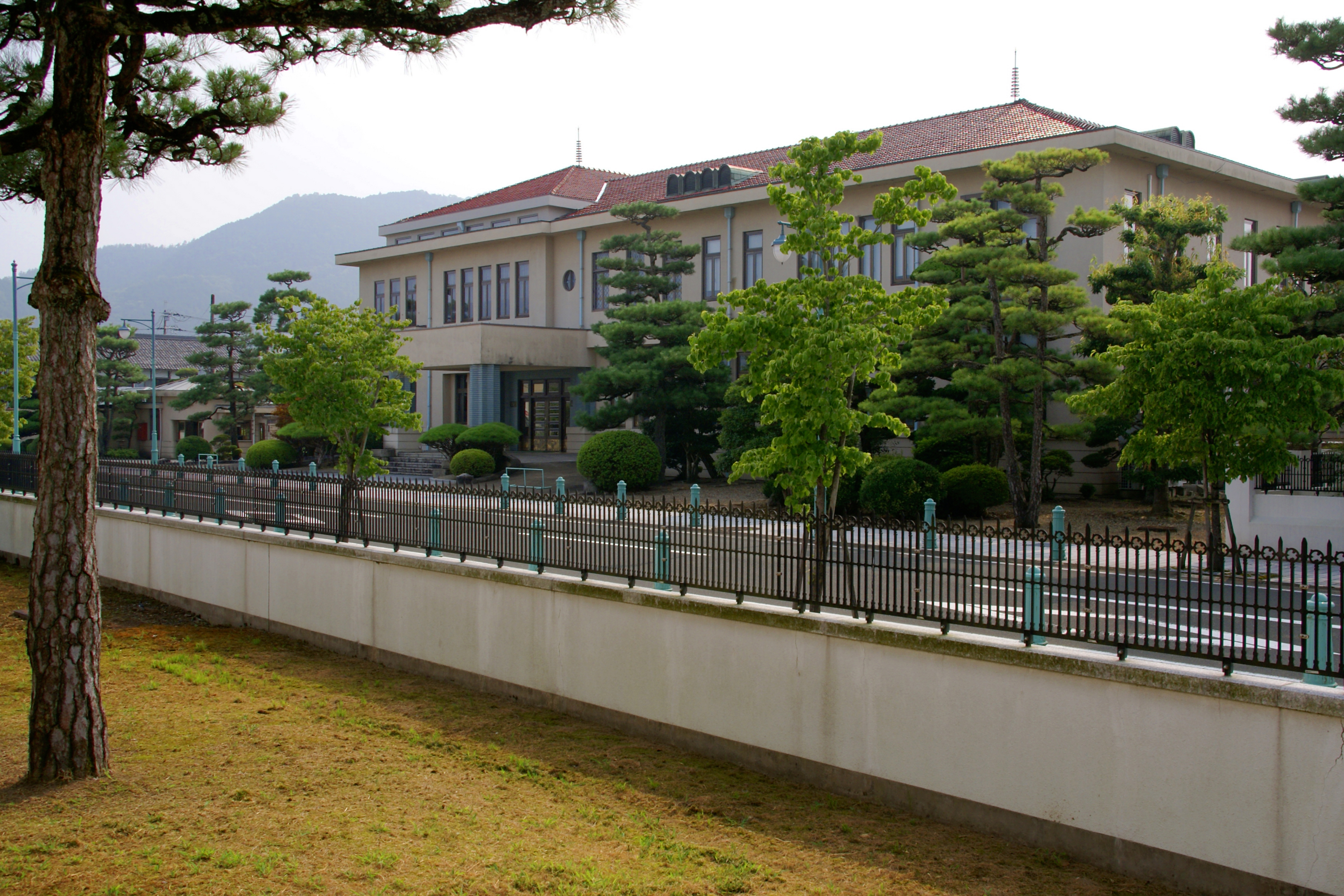
Gunze Head Office

Ayabe has a mixed economy of agriculture and light manufacturing, with several industrial parks in the city. The area was known from ancient times for weaving cloth, and the leading apparel manufacturer Gunze's registered headquarters are in Ayabe. It is known for the founding of Ōmoto.

== Education ==
Ayabe has ten public elementary schools and six public middle schools operated by the city government and one public high school operated by the Kyoto Prefectural Department of Education. Kyoto Prefectural Agricultural College has a campus in the city.

== Religion ==
Ayabe is the hometown of Nao Deguchi, a woman who founded the Oomoto religion in Ayabe in 1892. She proclaimed that Ayabe would be the new spiritual center of Japan from which the world would be renewed.

Baishō-en (梅松苑), the spiritual headquarters of the Oomoto religion, is located in Ayabe. Mount Misen is where the religion's founder, Nao Deguchi, secluded herself and received divine revelations in 1901.

== Transportation ==
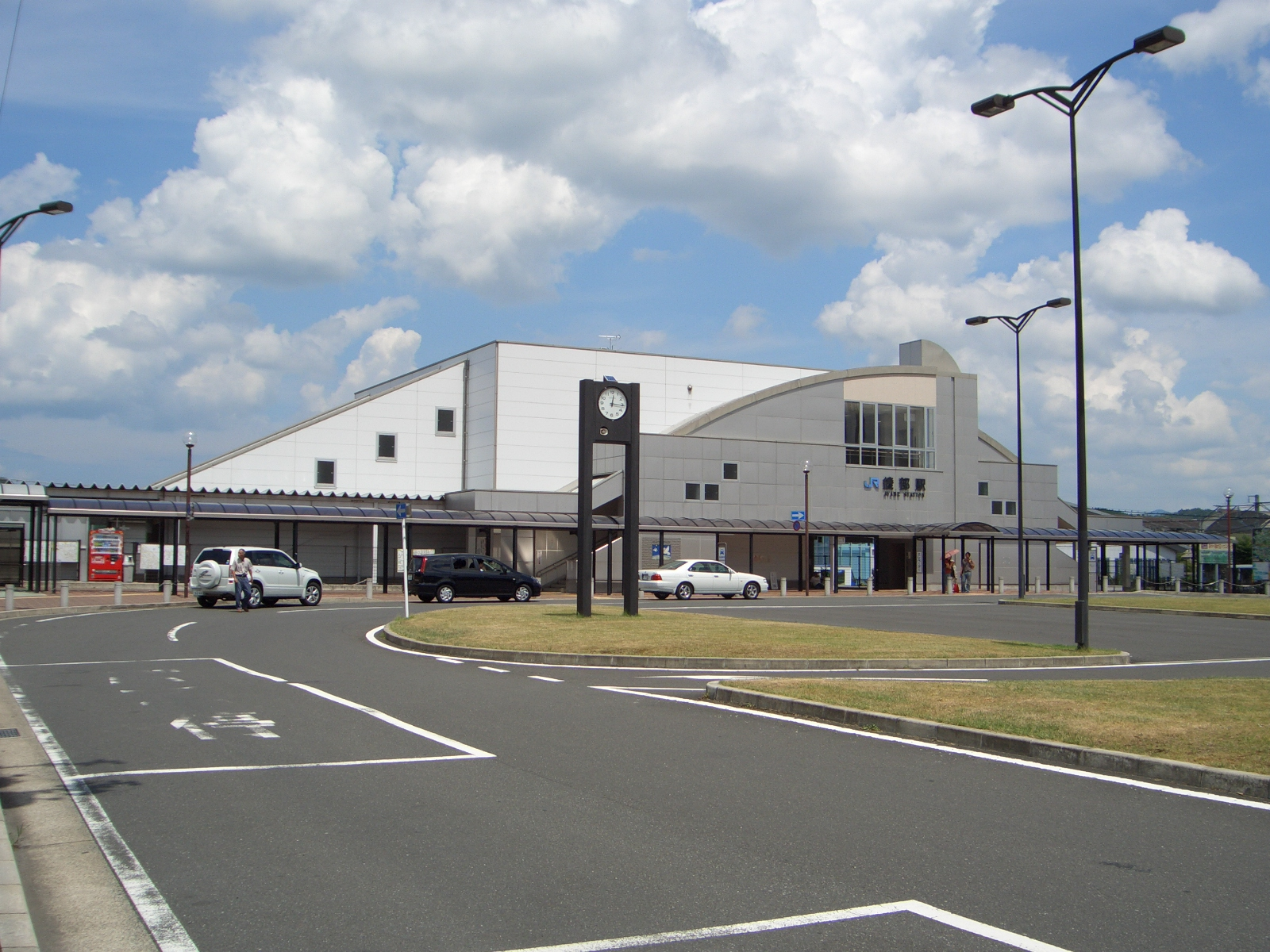
Ayabe Station

=== Railways ===
==== Conventional lines ====
JR West – San'in Main Line

- Yamaga - Ayabe - Kamikawaguchi - Takatsu

JR West – San'in Main Line

- Ayabe - Fuchigaki - Umezako

=== Roads ===
==== Expressways ====
- Maizuru-Wakasa Expressway
- Kyoto Jūkan Expressway

==== Japan National Route ====
- National Route 27
- National Route 173
- National Route 478

== Sister cities ==
- Changshu, China, friendship city
- Jerusalem, Israel, friendship city
