= Yoshinobu =

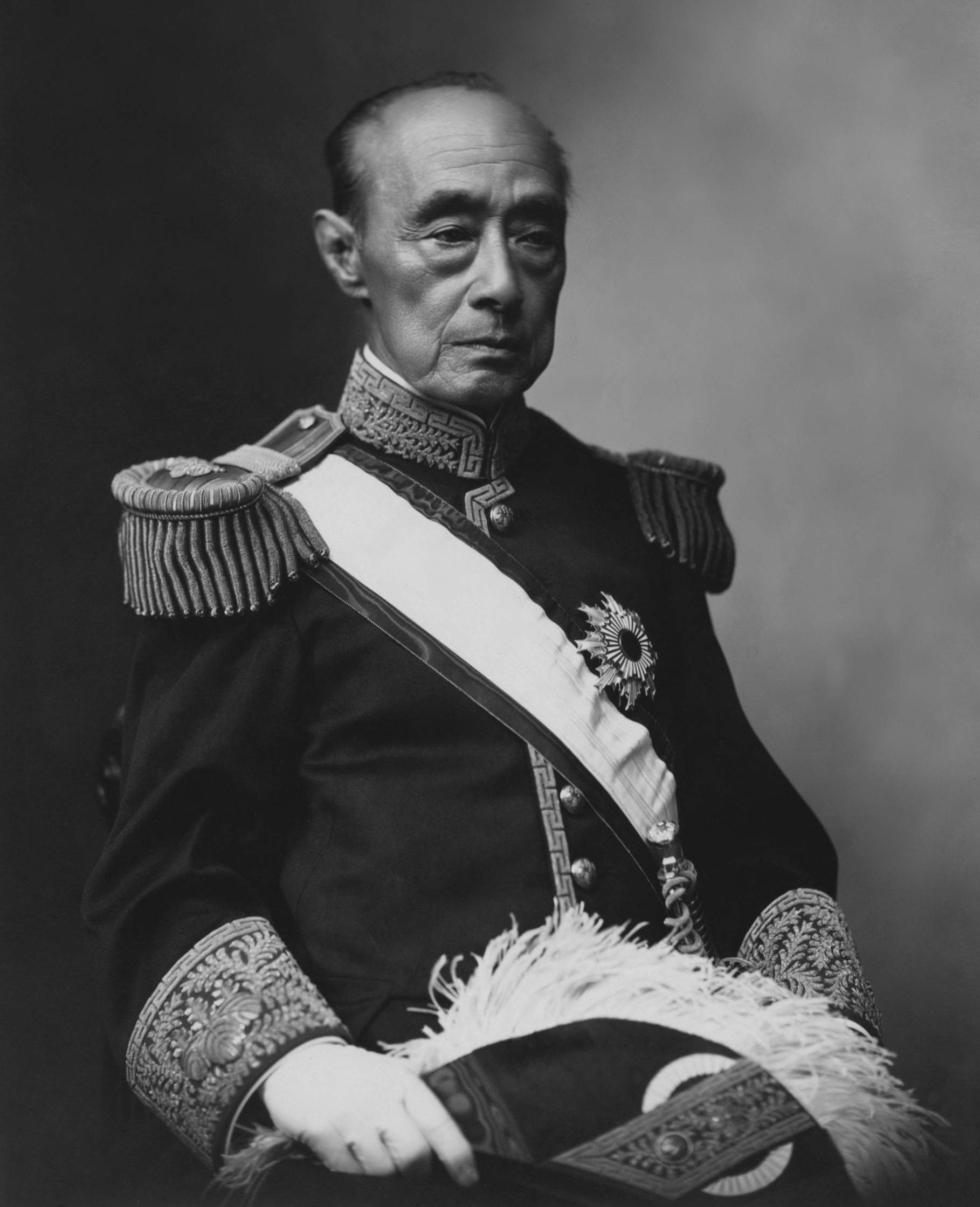
- Yoshinobu Tokugawa (1837–1913), the 15th and last shōgun of the Tokugawa shogunate of Japan
- Pronunciation: joɕinobɯ (IPA)
- Gender: Male

Origin
- Origin: Japanese
- Meaning: Different meanings depending on the kanji used

Other names
- Alternative spelling: Yosinobu (Kunrei-shiki) Yosinobu (Nihon-shiki) Yoshinobu (Hepburn)

Yoshinobu is a masculine Japanese given name.

== Written forms ==
Yoshinori can be written using many different combinations of kanji characters. Here are some examples:

- 義信, "justice, believe"
- 義伸, "justice, extend"
- 義延, "justice, extend"
- 佳信, "skilled, believe"
- 佳伸, "skilled, extend"
- 佳延, "skilled, extend"
- 善信, "virtuous, believe"
- 吉信, "good luck, believe"
- 吉伸, "good luck, extend"
- 良信, "good, believe"
- 恭信, "respectful, believe"
- 嘉信, "excellent, believe"
- 嘉伸, "excellent, extend"
- 嘉延, "excellent, extend"

The name can also be written in hiragana よしのぶ or katakana ヨシノブ.

== Notable people with the name ==
- James Yoshinobu Iha (井葉 吉伸; born 1968), better known as James Iha, Japanese-American rock musician
- Yoshinobu Ashihara (芦原 義信; 1918–2003), Japanese architect
- Yoshinobu Fujiwara (藤原 良信; born 1951), Japanese politician
- Yoshinobu Harada (原田 欽庸; born 1986), Japanese footballer
- Yoshinobu Ikeda (池田 義信; 1892–1973), Japanese film director and executive
- Yoshinobu Ishii (石井 義信; born 1939), Japanese footballer and manager
- Yoshinobu Ishikawa (石川 嘉延; born 1940), Japanese politician
- Yoshinobu Kanemaru (金丸 義信; born 1976), Japanese professional wrestler
- Ikuya Sawaki (real name Yoshinobu Mikami (三上 芳信) (born 1951), Japanese voice actor
- Yoshinobu Minowa (箕輪 義信; born 1976), Japanese footballer
- Yoshinobu Miyake (三宅 義信; born 1939), Japanese weightlifter
- Yoshinobu Miyake (religionist) (三宅 善信; born 1958), Japanese Shinto priest and scholar
- Yoshinobu Miyazaki (宮崎 義伸; born 1978), Japanese swimmer
- Yoshinobu Natsume (夏目 吉信; 1517–1573), Japanese samurai
- Yoshinobu Nisaka (仁坂 吉伸; born 1950), Japanese politician
- Yoshinobu Nishizaki (西崎 義展; 1934–2010), Japanese film producer
- Yoshinobu Ohga (大賀 好修), Japanese music arranger and guitarist
- Yoshinobu Ohira (平 喜信; born 1978), Japanese politician
- Yoshinobu Onakatomi (大中臣 能宣; 921–991), Japanese poet
- Yoshinobu Ota (太田 義信, born 1972), Japanese mixed martial artist
- Yoshinobu Oyakawa (親川 義信, born 1933), Japanese-American swimmer
- Yoshinobu Satake (佐竹 義宣; 1570–1633), Japanese daimyō
- Yoshinobu Shimamura (島村 宜伸; born 1934), Japanese politician
- Yoshinobu Takahashi (高橋 由伸; born 1975), Japanese baseball player and manager
- Yoshinobu Takeda (武田 義信; 1538–1567), Japanese daimyō
- Yoshinobu Tokugawa (徳川 慶喜; 1837–1913), Japanese shōgun
- Yoshinobu Tsukada (塚田 好宣; born 1969), Japanese golfer
- Yoshinobu Yamamoto (山本 由伸; born 1998), Japanese baseball player

== See also ==
- Yoshinobu Station, a railway station in Matsuno, Kitauwa District, Ehime Prefecture, Japan
- Yoshinobu Launch Complex, a launch site at the Tanegashima Space Center
- Tokugawa Yoshinobu-ke
