= Guardians of the directions =

Deities of the eight directions in Hinduism and Buddhism

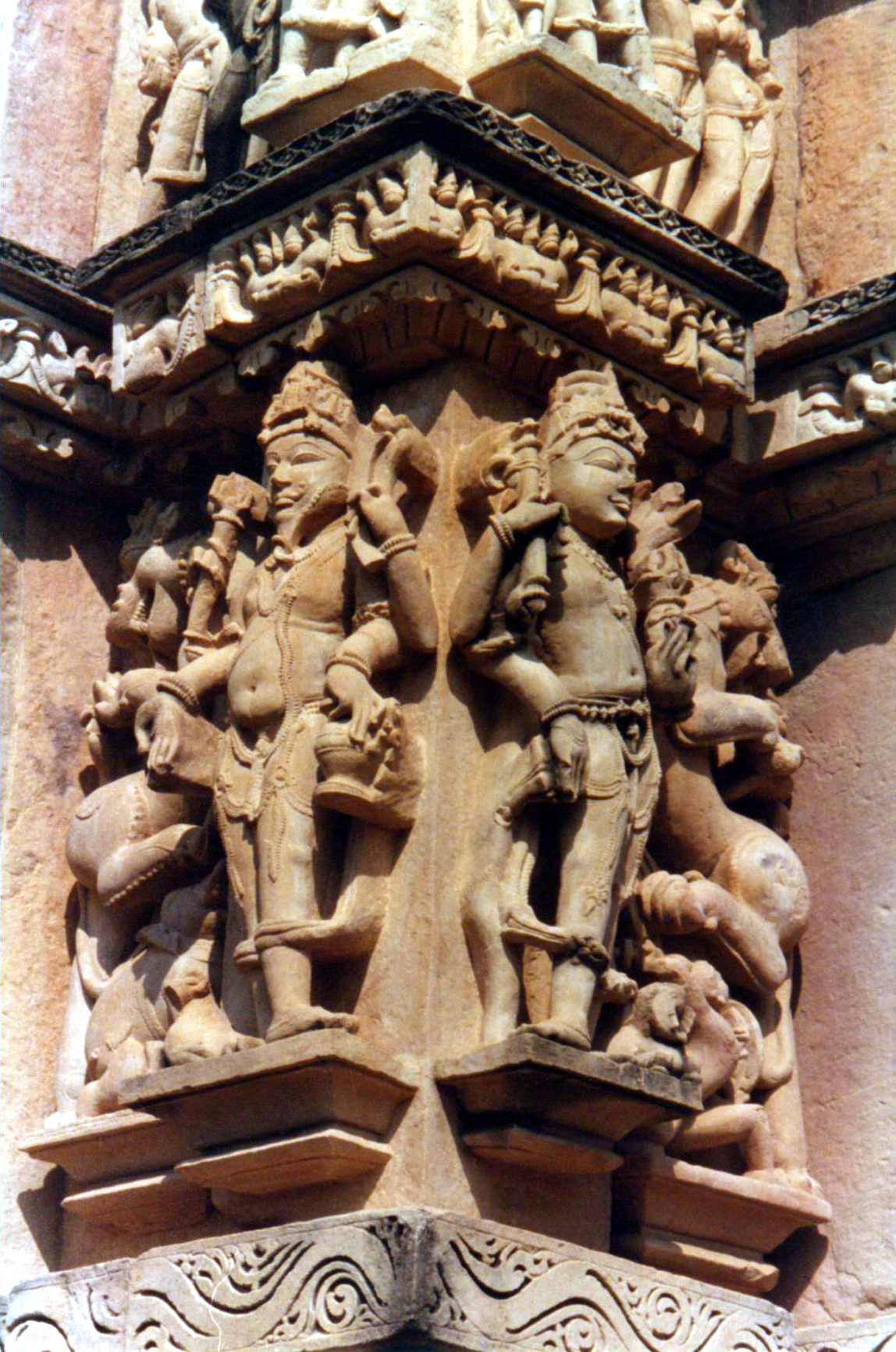
Parshvanatha Temple, Khajuraho, the southeast corner, with guardians Indra (E) and Agni (SE).

The Guardians of the Directions (Sanskrit: दिक्पाल, IAST: Dikpāla) are the deities who rule the specific directions of space according to Hinduism, Jainism and Vajrayāna Buddhism—especially Kālacakra. As a group of eight deities, they are called Aṣṭa-Dikpāla (अष्ट-दिक्पाल), literally meaning guardians of eight directions. They are often augmented with two extra deities for the ten directions (the two extra directions being zenith and nadir), when they are known as the Daśa-Dikpāla. In Hinduism it is traditional to represent their images on the walls and ceilings of Hindu temples. They are also often portrayed in Jain temples, with the exception that Nāga usually takes the place of Vishnu in the nadir. Ancient Java and Bali Hinduism recognize Nava-Dikpāla, literally meaning guardians of nine directions, that consist of eight directions with one addition in the center. The nine guardian gods of directions is called Dewata Nawa Sanga (Nine guardian devata). The diagram of these guardian gods of directions is featured in Surya Majapahit, the emblem of Majapahit empire.

There are strong similarities between the concept of the guardians of the directions and the lore surrounding the Chinese four symbols, four ancestral spirits who are responsible for four of the cardinal directions (North, South, East, and West).

== Directions in Hindu tradition ==
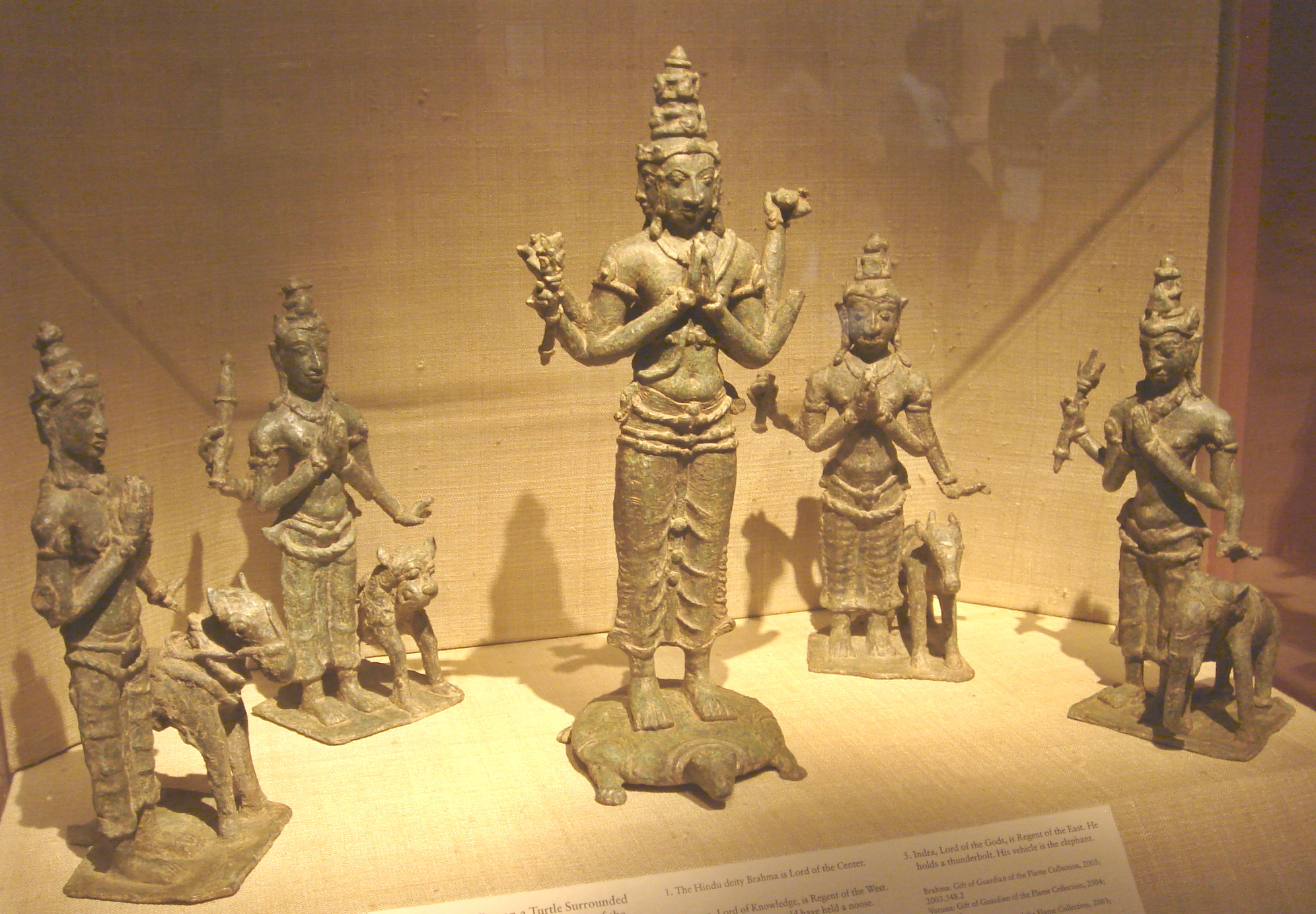
Brahma, Lord of the Zenith (center) with (from left) Varuna, Kubera, Yama and Indra.

Directions in Hindu tradition are called as Diśā, or Dik. There are four cardinal directions, six orthogonal directions and a total of ten directions, however infinite combinations are possible.

English	Sanskrit
North	Uttara, Udīcī
South	Dakṣiṇa, Avācī
East	Pūrva, Prācī, Prāk, Aruna
West	Paścima, Pratīcī, Aparā
Northeast	Īśāna
Southeast	Agni
Northwest	Vāyu
Southwest	Nirṛta
Zenith	Ūrdhva
Nadir	AdhaH

== Lokapālas ==
In Hinduism, the guardians of the cardinal directions are called the Lokapālas (लोकपाल), or Dikpalaka. Three main distinctions of Dikpalaka are recognized, being:

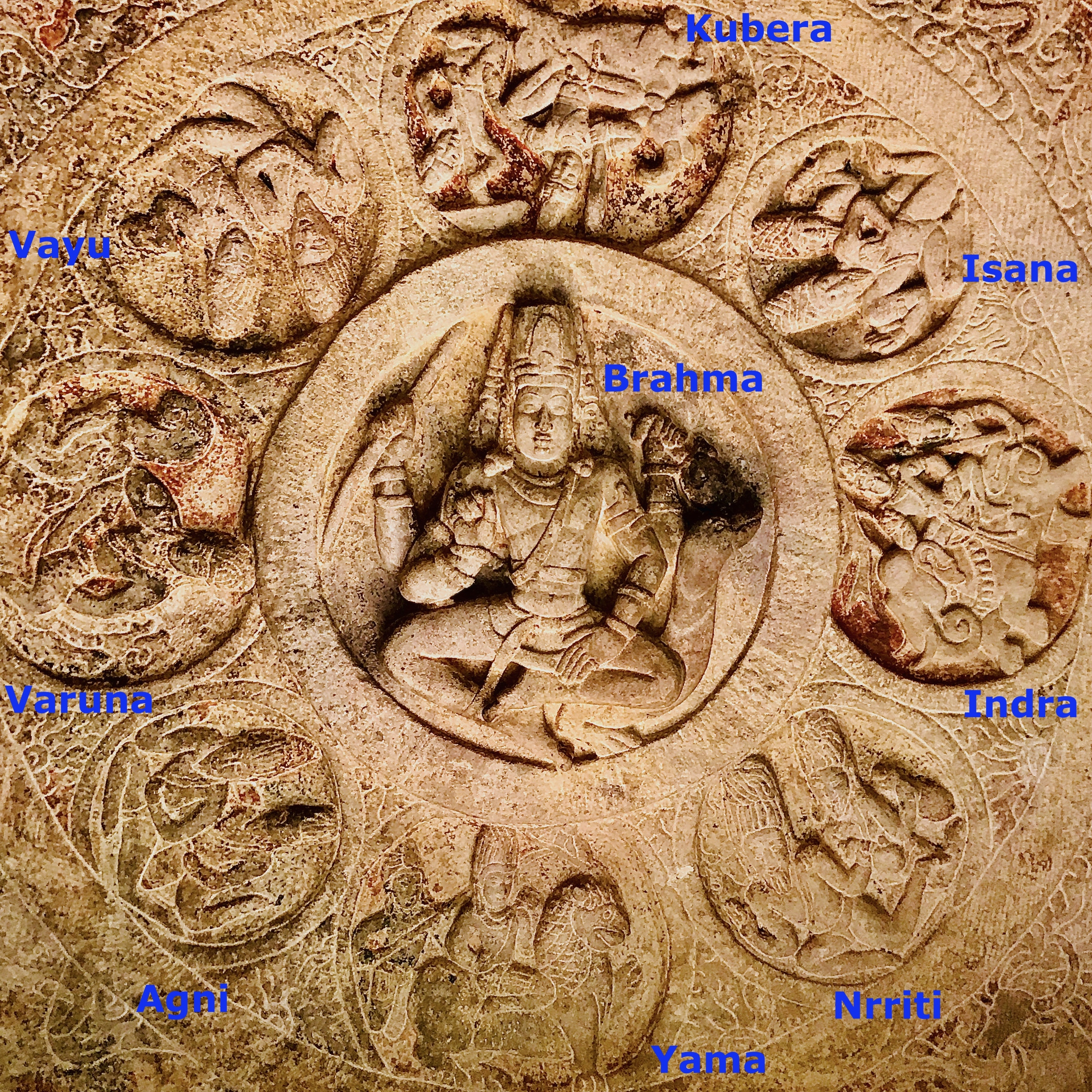
The Ashta-Dikpala with Brahma in the centre denoting Zenith

=== Aṣṭa-Dikpāla ("Guardians of Eight Directions") ===
Name	Direction
Kubera, God of Fortune	North
Yama, God of Justice and Death	South
Indra, Lord of Heaven and God of the Weather, Sky, Rain, and Storms	East
Varuna, God of the Seas, Oceans, and Rain	West
Ishana, God of Birth, Death, Resurrection, and Time	Northeast
Agni, God of Fire	Southeast (in the image incorrectly shown on southwest)
Vayu, God of the Winds and Air	Northwest
Nirṛta, God of Death, Sorrow, and Decay	Southwest (in the image incorrectly shown on southeast)

=== Daśa-Dikpāla ("Guardians of Ten Directions") ===
Besides the eight guardians, the following are added:

- Brahma (Zenith, meaning "the farthest up from the gravitational force")
- Vishnu (Nadir, meaning "the direction in which gravity pulls")

=== Nava-Dikpāla ("Guardians of Nine Directions") ===
The diagram of Surya Majapahit shows the arrangements of Hindu deities each resided in main cardinal points.

(Called Devata Nawa Sanga in ancient Java and Bali Hinduism)

- Shiva (Center)
- Vishnu (North)
- Brahma (South)
- Isvara (East)
- Mahadeva (West)
- Sambhu (Northeast)
- Mahesora (Southeast)
- Sangkara (Northwest)
- Rudra (Southwest)

== Directions in Japanese Onmyōdō ==
In Japanese Onmyōdō, directional guardianship is associated chiefly with the Konjin (金神), itinerant deities of metal believed to change position according to the year, lunar month, and season. The direction currently occupied by a Konjin was considered inauspicious, and travelers observed the practice of katatagae ("changing direction"), deliberately journeying toward a different direction for a day before resuming their route, to avoid setting out toward a taboo direction where a Konjin, Ten'ichijin, or Taihakujin was believed to reside. Widely observed among Heian-period nobility, the practice was reinforced by belief in the "seven deaths of Konjin", according to which violating a Konjin's taboo direction could cause the deaths of up to seven close relatives.

From the mid-Heian period, the Jingikan (Department of Worship) also conducted the Shikaku-sai ("Festival of the Four Directions") as part of a broader effort to formalize directional ritual observance within the Onmyōdō-influenced court religious system.

== See also ==
- Bacab
- Bhairava
- Diggaja
- Dikpali
- Four Heavenly Kings
- Four sons of Horus
- Mahavidya
- Maitei Ngaakpa Lai
- Matrikas
- Norðri, Suðri, Austri and Vestri
- Titan
