= Konkokyo =

Shinto-based religion

- 金光教
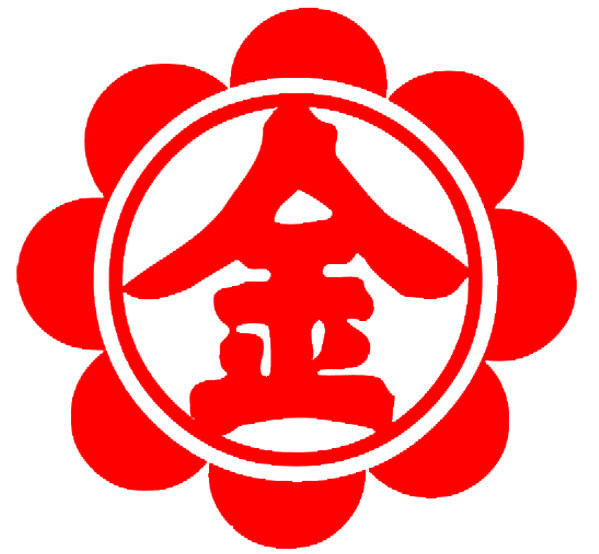
- Mon of Konkōkyō
- Classification: Shinto sect
- Scripture: Konkōkyō Kyōten (金光教教典, "Teachings of Konkōkyō")
- Headquarters: Asakuchi, Okayama Prefecture, Japan
- Founder: Konkō Daijin (金光大神)
- Origin: 1859; Okayama Prefecture, Japan
- Official website: konkokyo.jp

Konkōkyō (金光教, Konkō-kyō), or Konkō, is a Shinto sect with origins in Shinbutsu-shūgō beliefs. It is part of the Kyoha Shintō Rengōkai (教派神道連合会, Association of Sectarian Shinto). It was founded by Bunjirō Kawate (川手文治郎, Kawate Bunjirō; 1814–1883) (also known as Konkō Daijin (金光大神)) in 1859.

Konkōkyō primarily worships a kami named Tenchi Kane No Kami (天地金乃神), as well as other kami, namely the Mitama no Kami (divine spirits of those who died). To which every Konko worship hall has two altars for this purpose. To define Konkōkyō with any particular theism is difficult. As it is a Shinto sect, its general belief system and worldview aligns with Shinto as a whole. It can be defined with various ideas depending on how one personally interprets the nature of Tenchi Kane no Kami, whether it is monotheist, polytheist, henotheist, pantheist, and so forth. Regardless of one's personal interpretation, Konkōkyō does not deny or exclude other deities or other religions.

== Theology ==
Konkōkyō believers worship the spirit and energy that flows through all things (musubi, one of the core beliefs of Shinto) as Tenchi Kane No Kami (天地金乃神), or the Golden Kami of the Heavens and Earth (in Japanese, "Heavens and Earth" (天地) also means the Universe).

While Konkōkyō is hard to define with any one particular theology, Tenchi Kane no Kami is understood to be omnipresent and is essentially the energy that exists within and is the universe and imbues all things with consciousness, a director of the workings of nature, who interacts with humanity in a spiritual-natural and cooperative/interdependent fashion. The physical universe is referred to as "Kami’s body" or go-shintai in Konko texts.

In Konkōkyō theology, the relationship between Kami and humanity is a benevolent and interdependent one. Kami is often seen as a divine ideal parent - offering love, affection, support, protection, and nurturing us through his blessings. Konkōkyō teaches that Kami loves all people of the world no matter their race, religion, gender, etc. Although mentioned as 'He' in materials for linguistic convenience, Tenchi Kane no Kami is neither male or female.

The sole interest of Tenchi Kane no Kami is the happiness of individual humans. Konkōkyō's ideal is the alleviation of human suffering through two means; firstly, realizing all occurrences and parts of human life are gifts of Kami and part of the natural order and maintenance of the universe, and secondly, realizing the identity of the self and the universe as undying and part of Tenchi Kane No Kami. Humans are to serve their role in the universe with inner peace, and bring joy to themselves through healthy and natural indulgence.

Tenchi Kane No Kami is also referred to as "Tenchi No Kami-Sama" (天地乃神様), "Oyagami-Sama" (親神様), "Kami-Sama" (神様), and "Kami" (神). In English, Kami can also be called the "Divine Parent of the Universe," "Principle Parent," "Parent Kami," "Kami-Sama," or "Kami."

== Founder ==
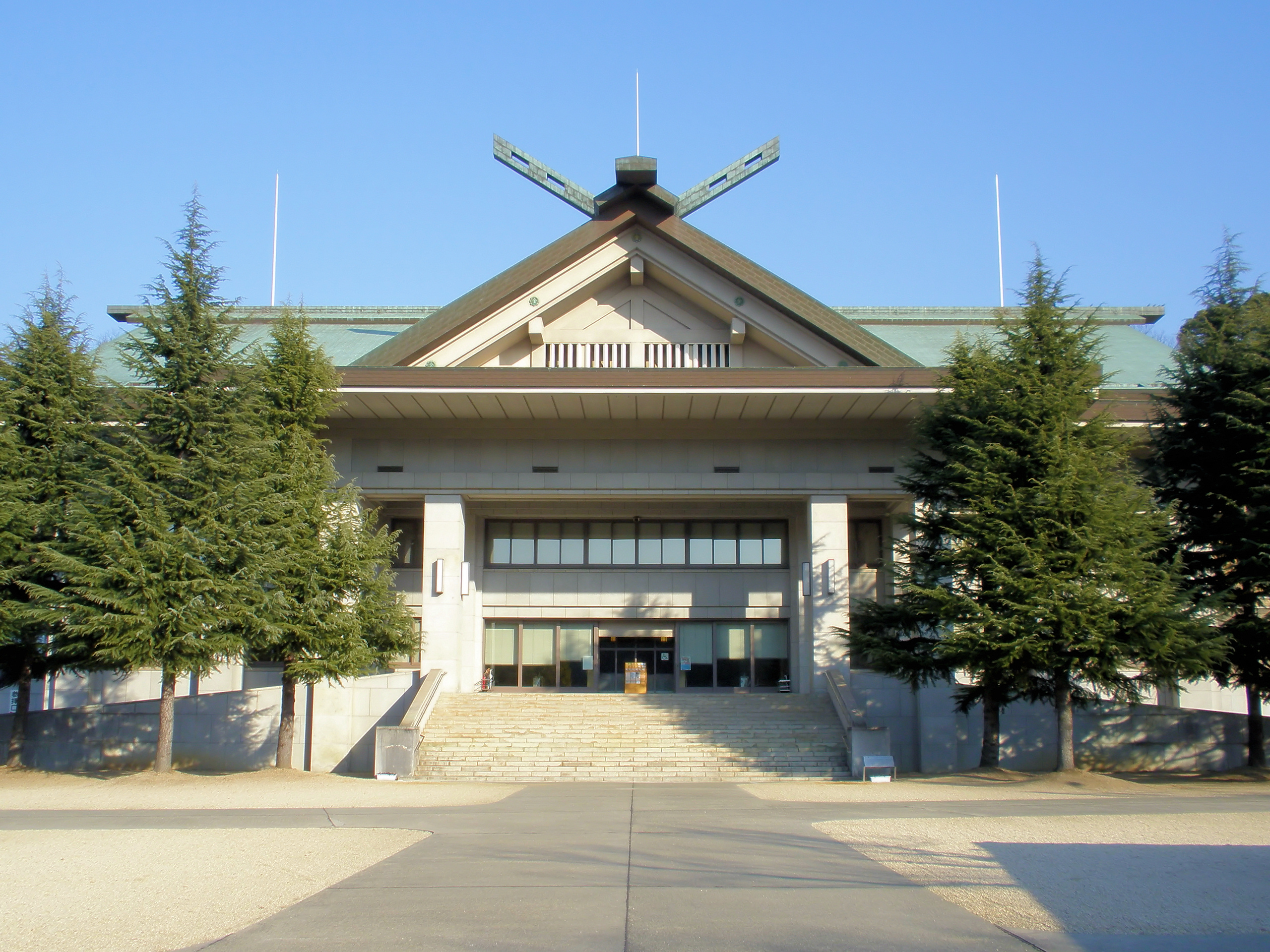
Central Worship Hall (Konkōkyō Headquarters) in Asakuchi, Okayama Prefecture

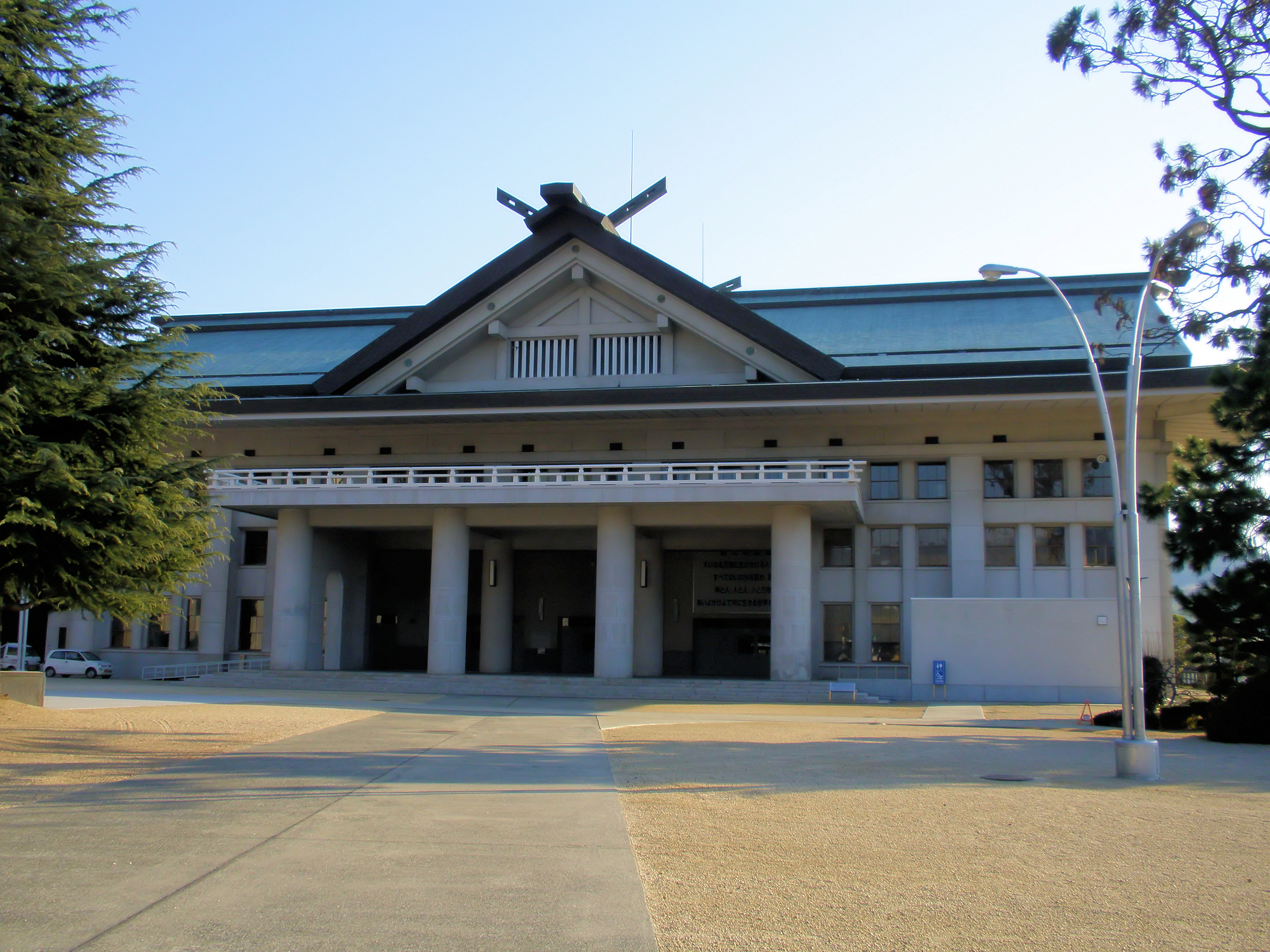
Grand Service Hall (Konkōkyō Headquarters) in Asakuchi, Okayama Prefecture

Bunjirō Kawate (川手文治郎, Kawate Bunjirō; 1814–1883), known by Konkōkyō followers as Konkō Daijin (金光大神), is recognized as the founder of Konkōkyō, beginning in 1859. He was born on September 29, 1814, in the village of Urami in Bitchū Province (in present-day Asakuchi, Okayama Prefecture) to a farming family. Urami was a small quiet village located about two kilometers northwest of present-day Konkōkyō Headquarters. Genshichi was often carried on his father's back and visited various shrines and temples. Given the name Genshichi, he was the second son of Kandori Juhei (Father) and Kandori Shimo (Mother). When Bunji was 13, he received education from Ono Mitsuemon, the village headman for two years.

As Genshichi was the second son and thus not expected to take over the family lineage or farm, he was arranged to be adopted in the fall of 1825. At age twelve, Genshichi was adopted into the Kawate household by Kawate Kumejiro (Father) and Kawate Iwa (Mother), and he was renamed Kawate Bunjiro, or Bunji. He worked assiduously for the prosperity and welfare of his family, and he gained the respect of those around him.

In 1855, at the age of forty-two, Bunjirō went to the important shrine of Okayama Prefecture Kibitsu Jinja to do a divination and prayer ceremony as it was his yakudoshi (unlucky age year). He believed he had received a good omen, yet that year suffered from a serious throat ailment, rendering him in a chronic condition and unable to speak or move. He could not receive help from doctors, so he turned to ancient Shinto ritual with the help of his brother in law, Furukawa Jiro, to find the reason of his illness. The deity of Ishizuchi revealed through an oracle that Bunjirō was supposed to die from his illness for offending the deity Konjin. Realizing his mistakes, Bunjirō wanted to apologize to the deity. By this sincere desire to do so, he was able to gain his voice back, and was able to apologize to the deity with his own voice. From that time, he then gradually recovered from his illness completely, the experience impacting his faith and beliefs.

As he continued his faith practice from that day, more spiritual experiences occurred, and his faith grew in the Kami and Bodhisattvas. In particular, he prayed most often to Konjin due to the spiritual experience during his yakudoshi year and apologizing for his irreverence to this deity. Over time, his faith led him to pray to multiple kami at once as a composite deity. He understood this composite deity as Nittenshi (The Buddhist understanding of the Sun) Gattenshi (The Buddhist understanding of the Moon), and Kane no Kami (Nigimitama of Ushitora no Konjin). Ultimately, however, this deity revealed themselves through an oracle that they were not a composite deity, but the deity that was the spirit/soul that was the Universal workings and energy (not unlike the Hindu concept of Brahman), to which Bunjirō understood the name to be Tenchi Kane no Kami.

Thus, Bunjirō practiced his faith in this deity, Tenchi Kane no Kami, who revealed to him many teachings through spiritual experiences. On November 15, 1859 (The date understood as the founding date of the Konkōkyō way) Tenchi Kane no Kami asked Bunjirō to give up his farming career, and help people by listening to them and praying for their troubles or requests, and become a priest. In a response, Bunjirō gave up farming and devoted himself to helping others.

He taught others who came to his worship space that Tenchi Kane no Kami "Wishes to help and save people. But can do so only through other people. By helping people, one performs the work of this deity. This deity depends on people, and at the same time, people depend on this deity, in mutual fulfillment."

Before long, the number of visitors seeking advice and spiritual guidance grew, and as well a group of disciples called the deyashiro was formed to help Bunjirō spread the teachings of this deity.

After the Meiji Restoration of 1868, religious policies of the new government temporarily placed limits on Konkōkyō teachings, due to Tenchi Kane no Kami not being a formal deity of the Kojiki (the only deities allowed worship and shrines in the Meiji era), however, this provided an opportunity to develop important aspects that ended up preserving Konkōkyo's history and teachings, such as the memoir Konkō Daijin Oboegaki, written by Bunjirō documenting his spiritual experiences and daily living with his faith in Tenchi Kane no Kami. In his later years, he compiled the Oshirase-goto oboechō (Record of Revelations) which documented the spiritual experiences clearly. On October 10, 1883, Bunjirō died at the age of seventy.

He was succeeded by his son, Konko Ieyoshi, who became regarded as the successor and spiritual leader to pass on the Konkōkyō way of helping others, who was supported by the disciples of Bunjirō.

Subsequently, the Konko family line has retained their leadership roles and have been responsible for spiritually guiding the followers of Konkōkyō - the teachings of Tenchi Kane no Kami - since Bunjirō's passing.

The 6th generation son, Hiromichi Konko, became the spiritual leader of Konkōkyō in 2021.

== Beliefs ==
In Konkōkyō, everything is seen as being in profound interrelation with each other. Kami is not seen as distant or residing in heaven, but present within this world. The universe is perceived to be the body of Tenchi Kane no Kami. Suffering is seen as being caused by an individual's high expectations, unwillingness to compromise, impatience, arrogance, and disregard between the relationship between all things. Konkōkyō's beliefs center around the betterment of human life in this world by showing appreciation for all things, living upright, and providing mutual help, and prayer for others. By embodying these virtues, it is taught anyone can become an ikigami, or living kami - one who helps others unconditionally and has inner peace. An ikigami is not an exalted being or someone with mysterious, spiritual powers. It is the ideal human being who strives to save people from suffering and problems and to make the world a happier place to live in. It is believed that after death, the spirits of those who have passed on remain of the universe, as mitama-no-kami (divine ancestral spirits) in connection with Tenchi Kane No Kami.

Bunjirō taught that one could receive the help of Tenchi Kane no Kami by "having faith in the Kami out of a sincere mind" (known in Japanese as the phrase Jitsui Teinei Shinjin).

Konkōkyō believes there is a mutually dependent relationship between Tenchi Kane No Kami and people. People cannot exist without Tenchi Kane No Kami, and Tenchi Kane No Kami cannot exist without people. With air, water, food, and other blessings of the universe, all living things can thrive. In return, Tenchi Kane No Kami asks that people help others, live in harmony with the ways of the Universe, and make the world a peaceful place to live for everyone. By fulfilling Tenchi Kane No Kami's wishes to help others, people bring Tenchi Kane No Kami's virtue to life. Through this mutually reliant and interdependent relationship, both Tenchi Kane No Kami and people can continue to exist and work together to make the world a more peaceful place.

An aspect that separates Konkōkyō as a unique way is "Toritsugi 取次" (full name: Ikigami Konkō Daijin toritsugi (生神金光大神取次)) which means mediation. In Konkōkyō, Toritsugi (Mediation) is a spiritual practice for people to establish a communication link between themselves and Tenchi Kane no Kami. One can receive Toritsugi by a Konkōkyō minister, generally at a Konkōkyō church. A visitor enters the church, sits in front of the minister, and says whatever is on their mind. It can be a request to resolve a problem, or a word of thanks.

In Toritsugi, after the visitor says everything they have wanted to say, the minister relays the visitor's words to the spirit of Ikigami Konko Daijin (the spiritual formal name of Bunjirō, who was first taught Toritsugi by Tenchi Kane no Kami) in prayer. Ikigami Konko Daijin then helps the minister to further relay the words to Tenchi Kane No Kami.

Tenchi Kane no Kami then replies their message to the minister, who will then relay it back to the person.

By understanding the message of Tenchi Kane No Kami's teachings and advice, the visitor can receive guidance to their issues, or feel relieved from anxieties knowing the deity has heard their words. Toritsugi can help the person put a problem into perspective and find solutions from within their own hearts.

Tenchi Kane No Kami asks people to understand their teachings, thus to make people become aware of their relationship with the Universe and the ways of the Universe. By working within the framework of the laws of the Universe instead of going against it, people can avoid troubles which lead to suffering. While Toritsugi at churches is typically performed by ministers, lay members are also encouraged to perform Toritsugi in their daily lives to help others. When they meet people who are suffering, the Konkōkyō way is to listen to their problems, support them, and pray for their wellbeing and happiness. Tenchi Kane no Kami wishes for all people to become a mediator and help others.

Konkōkyō has churches where people can go to worship and pray. Though Konkōkyō believes that Tenchi Kane No Kami is everywhere, and followers of the way can talk to the deity anytime and anywhere, the church is a place to receive assistance and guidance through Toritsugi, and for people to focus their prayers, to appreciate blessings, apologize for any irreverences they may feel they have made, as well as be a safe and calming center for people to visit.

The faith believes that all people came from and are connected by the universe. This means that all people are connected by Tenchi Kane no Kami and there is no one that does not belong. Konkōkyō desires to have all people, regardless of race, creed, gender, and occupation, work together to resolve the problems of the world. The faith also respects and accepts all ethnic groups and religions.

All people are regarded as equal regardless of race, religion, gender, occupation, social status, and wealth. Women in Konkōkyō are also held in high esteem with many women serving as head ministers at its churches.

Konkōkyō also does not impose any restrictions on food and drink. Konkōkyō believers are permitted to consume alcohol, caffeine, meat, etc.

Celibacy is also not a requirement for the clergy or anyone. There are no restrictions for Konkōkyō believers. Additionally, believers are not obligated or required to pay any dues or make any donations.

Defining Konkōkyō's theology in Western terminology is complex, but panentheism, pantheism, non-dualism, animism, monotheism, and henotheism can be, and have been, used to describe the faith depending on one's definition of those terms. Konkōkyō, like Shinto and Buddhism in general, cannot be definitely categorized into any one of these theological categories.

== Membership ==
The following information is current as of December 1, 2012 (Kondō, 2013, p. 39).

- Churches (教会): 1,550
- Missions (布教所): 10
- Ministers (教師): 3,909
- Ministerʻs assistants/Deacons (補教): 1,855

There are about 450,000 adherents.

Konkōkyō churches and missions are found in the U.S., Canada, Brazil, Germany, Paraguay, and South Korea, and majorly Japan. Due to the Japanese cultural nature of Konkōkyō, it has limited churches overseas.

Through its various churches and missions, Konkōkyō has a number of activities and organizations that help fulfill the necessities of modern-day society: Konkōkyō Peace Activity Center, Konkō Library, Konkō Church of Izuo Miyake Homes (India, Bangladesh, and Nepal), Yatsunami Foundation, Shinkō-kai Medical Foundation, Konkō Academy, Wakaba Orphanage, and Katsuragi Memorial Park (cemetery) (Takahashi, 1994).

== Relationship to Shintō ==
Because of Japanese society being deeply intertwined with Shinbutsu shūgō at the time of Kawate Bunjirō, the founder, Konkōkyō is deeply rooted in Shinto ways, traditions, and rituals.

Due to the Meiji Restoration's new laws on Shinto practices, Konkōkyō was classified as a sect of Shintō. This allowed Konkōkyō to continue practicing as a spiritual way without persecution from the government.

Konkōkyō has never renounced this classification even after it was free to do so at the end of World War II, alongside the abolition of State Shinto and organization turning into shrine-based or Shrine (Jinja) Shinto.

As of June 2025, Konkōkyō maintains membership in the Kyoha Shintō Rengōkai (教派神道連合会, Association of Sectarian Shinto).

However, since Konkōkyō is not dogmatic; interpretations and understandings in regard to its connection to Shinto varies between individuals and regions. Despite this, historically, and to modern time in its beliefs, ceremonies, and other practices, Konkōkyō is a faith aligned within Shinto worldview as a Kyoha Shinto.

Jinja Shinto is the most well-known type of Shinto, so it is thought that Konkōkyō is different than Shinto in some way. However, since Shinto as a whole has no singular founder, doctrine, holy book, or alignment to any one particular Kami-sama or shrine, is more accurate to say it only differs from Jinja Shinto, but is still Shinto. The only few main differences between Jinja Shinto and Konkōkyō as a Kyoha Shinto are:

- Toritsugi Mediation, which is a practice unique to Konkōkyō.
- Not offering items commonly seen in Jinja Shinto shrines; such as ofuda or omamori, due to the teaching from Tenchi Kane no Kami that Konkōkyō churches shouldn't be a place that people feel pressured to donate to receive protection from omamori, or need to donate for an ofuda to call to the power of Tenchi Kane no Kami. In addition, if one has the financial ability and wishes to receive the items, it is taught that it is good to support the other kamis and Buddha's shrines or temples instead. This is also why Konkōkyō does not have set ritual fees, nor requires donations from visitors or parishioners.
- Konkōkyō has also centralized the Tenchi Kakitsuke [Reminder from the Universe, Divine Reminder] as its main focus on the altar and in prayers. Some churches only have a Tenchi Kakitsuke, while others have additional traditional items seen in Shinto shrines, such as sacred mirrors, or gohei, to indicate the presence of the kami.
- The faith also differs in some Jinja Shinto shrines that it does not believe in fears or taboos related to unlucky days, unlucky years (yakudoshi), and ominous directions.
- While not a part of Konkokyo as a whole - it should also be noted that some churches, especially overseas, have been making modern changes to worship style that are different than traditional Shintō style to be more welcoming to those unfamiliar with Japanese culture.
- Additionally, Konkōkyō-unique prayers were also written in 1983 from the original traditional Shintō prayers — Amatsu Norito, Ōharae no Kotoba, Rokkon Shoujyou no Ooharae, and so on — to Shinzen Haishi [Prayer to Kami], Reizen Haishi [Prayer to Ancestral spirits] and other prayers. Despite this, some churches overseas and in Japan, keep traditional Shinto ritual, worship, and prayers. It varies greatly from church to church, and a minister by minister basis. So some cases may be the same as Jinja Shinto, and other cases may be different.

== Comparisons with Christianity ==
D. C. Holtom and other scholars have pointed out striking similarities between Konkokyo and Christianity, with the life, sayings, and teachings of Konko Daijin closely resembling those of Jesus in many ways. Kamstra (1994) argues that Konkokyo and Tenrikyo were indeed influenced by Christianity, although this has been disputed by other scholars who find no evidence for such historical influence.

== Publications ==
The Konkōkyō Kyōten (金光教教典) is Konkokyo's primary scripture. The main volume consists of three parts:

1. Kyōten Konkō Daijin Oboegaki (金光大神御覚書): 25 chapters
2. Kyōten Oshirase-goto Oboe-chō (お知らせ事覚帳): 27 chapters, one for each year from 1857 to 1883
3. Kyōten Gorikai (金光大神御理解集) (This part, by far the largest one, consists of 3 volumes.)
  1. Volume 1: 27 sections ordered according to the name of the disciple
  2. Volume 2: 153 sections ordered according to the name of the disciple
  3. Volume 3: 8 sections, which are (in order) Omichi Annai (御道案内), Shinkai (慎誡), Kyōso Gorikai (教祖御理解), Shinkun (神訓), Konkō Kyōso Gorikai (金光教祖御理解), Gorikai Shūi (御理解拾遺), Jinkyūkyō Goroku (尋求教語録), and Naiden (内伝)

In addition to the main volume, there are also the following supplemental volumes:

- Index (用語索引)
- Announcements (お知らせ事覚書帳注釈) (annotated historical notices and memoranda)
- Biographical dictionary (人物誌)
- Glossary (用語事典)
- Supplement (追補) (122 verses of teachings that 12 followers had received from Konko Daijin)

Various books have been translated into English, Portuguese, Spanish, and Korean. English-language publications include:

- English translation of the Konkokyo Kyoten (金光教教典), published in 5 separate volumes:
  - Kyoten Konko Daijin Oboegaki: Memoirs of Konko Daijin (金光大神御覚書)
  - Kyoten Oshirase-goto Oboe-cho: Record of Revelations (お知らせ事覚帳)
  - Kyoten Gorikai: Teachings of Konko Daijin (金光大神御理解集) (3 volumes)
- Voice of the Universe: Selected teachings of Konkokyo (天地は語る)
  - Portuguese translation: A Voz do Universo: Ensinamentos selecionados de Konkokyo (2008)
- Prayer Book (拝詞集)
- Shine from Within: An Introduction to the Konko Faith (2009) (金光教案内)
- Konko Daijin: A Biography
- Selected Teachings of Konko Daijin (with contemporary explanations)
- From Farmer to Founder: The Biography of Konko Daijin (2020)
- The Founder of the Konko Faith (2015 manga)
- Arigato: One Hundred Times A Day (2023)
- Arigato-kun: Mr. Thank you (2023)

== See also ==
- Shinto sects and schools
- Shinto
- Konjin
- Shinbutsu shūgō
- Kagamitarō Konkō
- Yoshiaki Fukuda
- Yoshinobu Miyake (religionist)
