= Konko Daijin =

Japanese founder of Konkōkyō (1814–1883)

Konkō Daijin 金光大神
- Title: Ikigami Konkō Daijin (生神金光大神)

Personal life
- Born: Kandori Genshichi 香取 源七 (later Kawate Bunjirō 川手 文治郎; also known as Akazawa Bunji 赤沢 文治); 29 September 1814 Urami village, Bitchū Province, Japan (modern Asakuchi, Okayama Prefecture)
- Died: 10 October 1883 (aged 69) Ōtani (now Konkō-chō), Asakuchi, Okayama Prefecture
- Children: Konkō Ieyoshi (金光 宅吉)
- Parents: Kandori Jūhei (香取 十平) (biological) Kawate Kumejirō (川手 粂治郎) (adoptive) (father); Kandori Shimono (香取 しもの) (mother)
- Known for: Founder of Konkōkyō
- Occupation: Religious leader; farmer

Religious life
- Religion: Konkōkyō

Konkō Daijin (金光大神) (September 29, 1814 – October 10, 1883) was the Japanese founder of Konkōkyō (the "Konko Faith"). Born a farmer in present-day Okayama Prefecture of western Japan, he experienced a divine revelation on November 15, 1859. From that time on, he devoted himself to serving Tenchi Kane no Kami (天地金乃神), the golden Kami of Heaven and Earth.

== Biography ==
Konkō Daijin was born Kandori Genshichi (香取源七) in the village of Urami (present-day Konko Town, Asakuchi, Okayama Prefecture). He was born as the second son of a farming family, to Kandori Jūhei (香取十平) and Shimono (しもの). In 1825, he was adopted by the Kawate (川手) family and took the name Kawate Bunjirō (川手文治郎; also known as "Bunji" 文治). At age 23, he became head of the household. Following the wishes of his adoptive father Kawate Kumejirō (川手粂治郎), he changed his family name to Akazawa (赤沢), becoming known as Akazawa Bunji (赤沢文治).

In 1855, at the age of 42, a series of family tragedies and a severe illness catalyzed his turn to religion. Initially interpreting his sickness through popular beliefs about the fearsome deity Konjin (金神), he came to understand that the true, benevolent deity upholding the universe is Tenchi Kane no Kami (天地金乃神).

On November 15, 1859, he received what later followers call the "Divine Call," instructing him to give up farming and assist people through toritsugi (取次, "mediation"). He thereafter devoted himself to religious work at a worship space in his home. In 1868, he received the divine title Ikigami Konkō Daijin (生神金光大神) ("Living Deity, Great Golden Light").

Government policies during the early Meiji period constrained his activities. In 1873, he was ordered to remove his household altar, due to new regulations targeting exorcists and spiritualists. During this period of introspection, he promulgated the Tenchi Kakitsuke (天地書付) ("Reminder of Heaven and Earth"), and toritsugi (取次) soon resumed under close police oversight.

Konkō Daijin died on October 10, 1883. He was succeeded by his son Konkō Ieyoshi (金光宅吉), who is venerated by Konkōkyō followers as the "Second Konkō-Sama" (二代金光様; divine title: Konkō Shijin 金光四神).

== Teachings and practice ==
Konkō Daijin's central practice was toritsugi (取次) — listening to people's troubles and relaying their requests to Tenchi Kane no Kami. His teaching emphasizes the interdependence and "mutual fulfillment" (aiyo kakeyo あいよかけよ) of kami and humanity. He rejected fatalistic divination, geomancy, pollution taboos, and mandatory financial offerings at shrines and temples, and instead advocated faith, gratitude, and ethical self-cultivation.

== Writings and scriptures ==
Konkōkyō Kyōten, which constitutes Konkōkyō's main scriptural collection, include texts attributed to Konko Daijin, as well as compilations of his sayings by his early followers.

- Konkō Daijin Oboegaki (金光大神御覚書) (Memoirs of Konko Daijin), begun in 1874 at age 61; a religious autobiography.
- Oshirase-goto Oboechō (お知らせ事覚帳) (Record of Revelations), documenting revelations and experiences from 1857 to shortly before his death in 1883.
- Gorikai (御理解集) I–III (Teachings of Konko Daijin), compilations of teachings transmitted to and recorded by disciples.

English translations of the Oboegaki (御覚書) and related materials have been published by Konkokyo Headquarters and affiliated organizations.

== Relationship with State Shintō ==
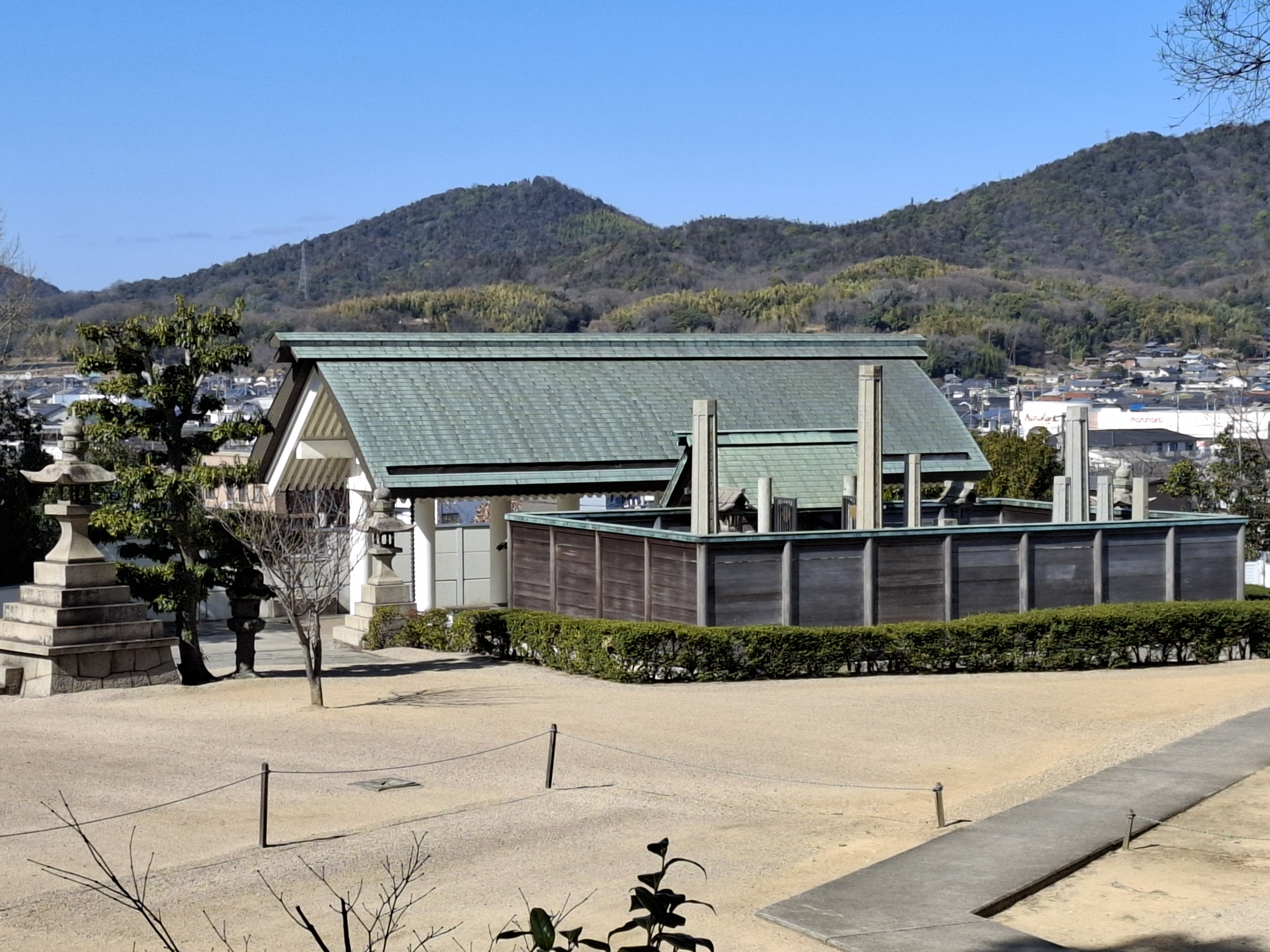
Konko Daijin's gravesite at the Konkokyo Headquarters

During his lifetime, Konkō Daijin obtained a license from the Shirakawa (白川) house of Shintō. After his death, some disciples sought official recognition for Konkokyo as one of the official Sect Shintō organizations in order to comply with Emperor Meiji's religious regulations.

== See also ==
- Konkōkyō
- Kurozumi Munetada, the founder of Kurozumikyō
