= Kagamitarō Konkō =

- 金光 鑑太郎

Personal life
- Born: 26 April 1909
- Died: 10 January 1991 (aged 81)

Religious life
- Religion: Konkōkyō

Kagamitarō Konkō (金光 鑑太郎, Konkō Kagamitarō; 26 April 1909 – 10 January 1991) was a Japanese Konkōkyō leader, calligrapher, poet, cultural leader, and educator.

Konkō founded the Konkō Library and was the first library director. From 1954 to 1990, he advised the Japan Library Association. From 1973 to 1990, he advised the Boy Scouts of Nippon.

Hiroki Kōsai of Saji Observatory, who had a good relationship with him, named asteroid 4526 Konko 1982 KN_{1} and 11254 Konkohekisui (18 February 1977 list^{[A]}) in his honor.

== Works ==
- 『生きる力の贈りもの』（金光教徒社、2001年）
- 『土』1-19（槻の木叢書）
