= Konkokyo Kyoten =

Main scripture of the Konkokyo religion

Konkōkyō Kyōten
- 金光教教典
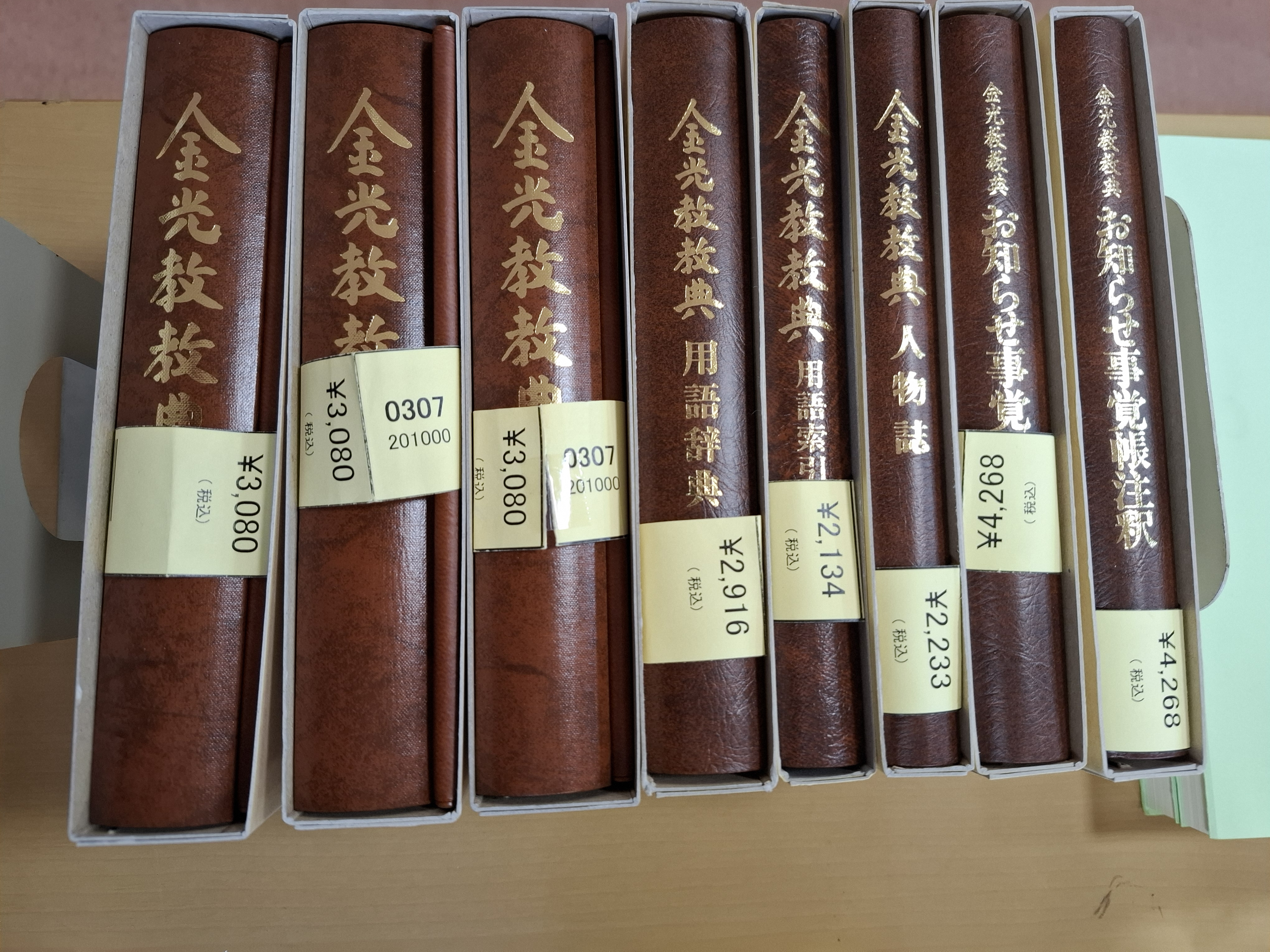
- Konkōkyō Kyōten volumes at the Konkōkyō Headquarters bookstore

Information
- Religion: Konkokyo
- Author: Konkō Daijin, et al.
- Language: Japanese
- Period: 19th century
- Books: 5
- Chapters: 240

The Konkōkyō Kyōten (Japanese: 金光教教典; lit. "Konkokyo Book of Teachings") is the main religious scripture of Konkokyo, a Shinto-derived Japanese religion founded in 1859 by Konkō Daijin (金光大神) (1814–1883). Konkōkyō Kyōten is a compilation of various writings composed by Konkō Daijin and his disciples during the second half of the 19th century.

== Contents ==
The Konkōkyō Kyōten (金光教教典) is Konkokyo's primary scripture. It consists of three parts, of which the third part, Kyōten Gorikai (金光大神御理解集, "Teachings of Konko Daijin"), is the largest one.

1. Kyōten Konkō Daijin Oboegaki (金光大神御覚書, "Memoirs of Konko Daijin"): 25 chapters, which Konko Daijin began writing starting from November 23, 1874.
2. Kyōten Oshirase-goto Oboe-chō (お知らせ事覚帳, "Record of Revelations"): 27 chapters, one for each year from 1857 to 1883.
3. Kyōten Gorikai (金光大神御理解集, "Teachings of Konko Daijin"): This part, by far the largest one, consists of 3 volumes. It consists of Konkō Daijin's orally transmitted teachings as written down by his various disciples.
  1. Volume 1: 27 sections ordered according to the name of the disciple. There are 25 disciples total, since there are 3 sections for one of the disciples, Ichimura Mitsugorō (市村光五郎).
  2. Volume 2: 153 sections ordered according to the name of the disciple
  3. Volume 3: 8 sections
    1. Omichi Annai (御道案内) (A Guide to the Faith)
    2. Shinkai (慎誡) (Admonitions)
    3. Kyōso Gorikai (教祖御理解) (The Founder's Teachings)
    4. Shinkun (神訓) (Instructions of the Faith)
    5. Konkō Kyōso Gorikai (金光教祖御理解) (Selected Teachings of Konko Daijin)
    6. Gorikai Shūi (御理解拾遺) (Collected Teachings)
    7. Jinkyūkyō Goroku (尋求教語録) (A Quest for the Teachings of the Faith)
    8. Naiden (内伝) (Special Stories)

In addition to the main book, there are also the following supplemental volumes:

- Index (用語索引)
- Announcements (お知らせ事覚書帳注釈) (annotated historical notices and memoranda)
- Biographical dictionary (人物誌)
- Glossary (用語事典)
- Supplement (追補) (122 verses of teachings that 12 followers had received from Konko Daijin)

== Editions ==
There is a 1983 Japanese edition of the main volume of the Konkōkyō Kyōten, as well as a more recent revised Japanese edition published in 2009. The English edition is published as 5 separate volumes:

- Kyoten Konko Daijin Oboegaki: Memoirs of Konko Daijin (金光大神御覚書)
- Kyoten Oshirase-goto Oboe-cho: Record of Revelations (お知らせ事覚帳)
- Kyoten Gorikai: Teachings of Konko Daijin (金光大神御理解集) (3 volumes)

== List of disciples ==
Below is a list of disciples in volumes 1 and 2 of the Kyōten Gorikai (金光大神御理解集). Some disciple names are repeated in both volumes.

Volume 1

1. Aoi Saki (青井サキ)
2. Ishihara Ginzō (石原銀造)
3. Ichimura Mitsugorō (市村光五郎) (1)
4. Ichimura Mitsugorō (市村光五郎) (2)
5. Ichimura Mitsugorō (市村光五郎) (3)
6. Ōkida Kisaburō (大喜田喜三郎)
7. Ogihara Sugi (荻原須喜)
8. Katsuta Tōzaemon (勝田藤左衛門)
9. Kanbara Yaematsu (神原八重松)
10. Kondō Fujimori (近藤藤守)
11. Saitō Sōjirō (斎藤宗次郎)
12. Satō Norio (佐藤範雄)
13. Satō Hikotarō (佐藤彦太郎)
14. Sawada Chōzaburō (沢田長三郎)
15. Shimamura Hachitarō (島村八太郎)
16. Tsugawa Haruo (津川治雄)
17. Dōgan Nui (道願縫)
18. Tokunaga Kenji (徳永健次)
19. Nakamura Yakichi (中村弥吉)
20. Nanba Kō (難波幸)
21. Nishina Shika (仁科志加)
22. Hatoya Koichi (鳩谷古市)
23. Fujimoto Jinkichi (藤本仁吉)
24. Matsuoka Kinjirō (松岡金次郎)
25. Yamamoto Sadajirō (山本定次郎)
26. Yoshimoto Kichihyōe (吉本吉兵衛)
27. Wada Yasube'e (和田安兵衛)

Volume 2

1. Aizawa Shinzō (相沢新造)
2. Aoi Saki (青井サキ)
3. Aoyama Kin'emon (青山金右衛門)
4. Akiyama Kinoe (秋山甲)
5. Akiyama Ko'ume (秋山小梅)
6. Akiyama Jinkichi (秋山甚吉)
7. Akiyama Yonezō (秋山米造)
8. Asano Kijūrō (浅野喜十郎)
9. Asano Torakichi's wife (浅野寅吉妻)
10. Asuwa Tokuhei (足羽徳平)
11. Amano Kihachi (天野喜八)
12. Ikegami Tami (池上タミ)
13. Ikeda Tomisuke (池田富助)
14. Ishii Kono (石井この)
15. Ishii Satoji (石井里次)
16. Ishii Tomoshichi (石井友七)
17. Ishii Tora (石井虎)
18. Ishida Tomosuke (石田友助)
19. Ishihara Ginzō (石原銀造)
20. Ishihara Minekichi (石原峰吉)
21. Ichimura Mitsugorō (市村光五郎)
22. Eura Hisakichi (江浦寿吉)
23. Ōkida Kisaburō (大喜田喜三郎)
24. Ōkura Taka (大倉たか)
25. Ōnishi Hide (大西秀)
26. Ōmoto Fujio (大本藤雄)
27. Oka Shigezō (岡繁蔵)
28. Oka Hidematsu (岡秀松)
29. Okada Katsu (岡田加津)
30. Okada Kiku (岡田キク)
31. Okano Torajirō (岡野寅次郎)
32. Okamoto Shige (岡本しげ)
33. Oshiki Masu (押木マス)
34. Kageyama Tsurukichi (影山鶴吉)
35. Kajitani Yasuzō (梶谷保蔵)
36. Kashiwabara Toku (柏原とく)
37. Kataoka Umakichi (片岡馬吉)
38. Kataoka Jirōshirō (片岡次郎四郎)
39. Katsura Matsuhei (桂松平)
40. Katsura Mitsu (桂ミツ)
41. Kanemitsu Umejirō (金光梅次郎)
42. Karahi Tsunezō (唐樋常蔵)
43. Kitamura Shūzō (北村周造)
44. Kunieda Sangorō (国枝三五郎)
45. Kōmoto Toratarō (河本虎太郎)
46. Goka Keishun (伍賀慶春)
47. Kotani Kuwa (小谷くわ)
48. Kobayashi Saisaburō (小林財三郎)
49. Kobayashi, Sunami, Toshimori (小林・角南・利守)
50. Konkō Ieyoshi (金光宅吉)
51. Konkō Nao (金光なほ)
52. Konkō Hagio (金光萩雄)
53. Kondō Tsuru (近藤ツル)
54. Kondō Fujimori (近藤藤守)
55. Kondō Yozaemon (近藤与左衛門)
56. Saitō Jūemon (斎藤重右衛門)
57. Saitō Matsuyo (斎藤松代)
58. Sakane Risaburō (坂根利三郎)
59. Satō Isogorō (佐藤礒五郎)
60. Satō Teru (佐藤照)
61. Satō Norio (佐藤範雄)
62. Satō Hikotarō (佐藤彦太郎)
63. Satō Mitsujirō (佐藤光治郎)
64. Shiota Mohachi (塩田茂八)
65. Shibuya Sen (渋谷仙)
66. Shimada Kinjirō (島田金次郎)
67. Shirakami Shin'ichirō (白神新一郎)
68. Shirakami Shin'ichirō II (二代白神新一郎)
69. Shiwaku Kiyo (塩飽きよ)
70. Sugita Tsuneo (杉田つねを)
71. Sugita Masajirō (杉田政次郎)
72. Sugihara Iwasuke (杉原岩助)
73. Suzuki Cho (鈴木てふ)
74. Sunada Kiyomatsu (砂田喜代松)
75. Sunami Sanokichi (角南佐之吉)
76. Senda Shima (千田志満)
77. Senda Taneji (千田種治)
78. Takahashi Tomie (高橋富枝)
79. Takeda Yojūrō (竹田与十郎)
80. Tanabe Tamigorō (田辺民五郎)
81. Tabuchi Aizō (田淵愛造)
82. Tamura Chūhei (田村忠平)
83. Tsuga (given name unknown) (津賀某)
84. Tsugawa Haruo (津川治雄)
85. Tsutsumi Seishirō (堤清四郎)
86. Teramasa Yosabe'e (寺政与三兵衛)
87. Doi Rikizō's father (土居力造父)
88. Toki Shūjirō (土岐周治郎)
89. Toshimori Shino (利守志野)
90. Tomita Tomi (富田トミ)
91. Tominaga Katsujirō (富永勝治郎)
92. Torigoe Shirōkichi (鳥越四郎吉)
93. Nakamura Mojirō (中村茂次郎)
94. Narumoto Shoichi (成本初市)
95. Nanba Kō (難波幸)
96. Nanba Nami (難波なみ)
97. Nanba Miyo (難波三代)
98. Nishina Matsutarō (仁科松太郎)
99. Nishina Waichi (仁科和市)
100. Nogami Nijūrō (野上仁十郎)
101. Noda Gihei (野田儀平)
102. Hōgetsu Kensuke (法月健助)
103. Happō Matakichi (八方又吉)
104. Hatoya Koichi (鳩谷古市)
105. Higuchi Shikatarō (樋口鹿太郎)
106. Hitomi Mine (人見峯)
107. Himeji Maki (姫路まき)
108. Hirano Goryoshirō (平野五良四郎)
109. Hirano Tomi (平野登美)
110. Fukushima Gihe'e (福嶋儀兵衛)
111. Fujii Kichi (藤井キチ)
112. Fujii Kiyono (藤井きよの)
113. Fujii Kura (藤井くら)
114. Fujii Tsunejirō (藤井恒治郎)
115. Fujii Hirotake (藤井広武)
116. Fujiwara Kazō (藤原嘉造)
117. Fujiwara Zenpei (藤原善平)
118. Furukawa Kono (古川この)
119. Furukawa Sansaku (古川参作)
120. Furukawa Teru (古川てる)
121. Horimoto Rikichi (堀本利吉)
122. Maki Tsune (槙つね)
123. Masumura Sekitarō (益村関太郎)
124. Matsumoto Taishichi (松本太七)
125. Matsuyama Katsuzō (松山勝蔵)
126. Mandai Mitsuzō (万代光造)
127. Mizutani Zenshichi (水谷善七)
128. Mimura Sano (三村佐野)
129. Miyanaga Sukeshirō (宮永助四郎)
130. Miyanaga Nobuzō (宮永延蔵)
131. Muraki Masu (村木マス)
132. Muroyama Motozō (室山本造)
133. Mori Kiku (森キク)
134. Morimasa Kenkichi (森政謙吉)
135. Morimasa Sadano (森政さだの)
136. Morimoto Nobu (森本伸)
137. Yamagata Shunzō (山形春蔵)
138. Yamashita Sanoichi (山下佐之市)
139. Yamashita Seisaku (山下清作)
140. Yamashita Yoshi (山下よし)
141. Yamada Matasuke (山田又助)
142. Yamamoto Sadajirō (山本定次郎)
143. Yamamoto Tome (山本留)
144. Yuasa Jingorō (湯浅甚五郎)
145. Yuasa Tsui (湯浅津伊)
146. Yokota Hisa (横田ヒサ)
147. Yoshida Tasaburō (吉田多三郎)
148. Yoshida Yoshisuke (吉田芳助)
149. Yoshihara Ryōzō (吉原良三)
150. Wada Kahei (和田嘉平)
151. Wada Yasube'e (和田安兵衛)
152. Watanabe Tome (渡辺登免)
153. (unknown) (伝承者不明)

== Tenchi wa kataru ==
400 selected passages from the Konkōkyō Kyōten are organized topically in Tenchi wa kataru (天地は語る), a book published by the Konkokyo headquarters. The English translation is titled Voice of the Universe: Selected teachings of Konkokyo, while the Portuguese translation, published in 2008, is titled A Voz do Universo: Ensinamentos selecionados de Konkokyo. There are also Spanish and Korean translations of Tenchi wa kataru.

The table below gives the corresponding Konkōkyō Kyōten verse numbers for each of the 400 quotations in Voice of the Universe (天地は語る).

No. in Voice	Order in Kyōten	Volume (Kyōten)	Section (Kyōten)	Verse number (Kyōten)
298	1	Oboegaki	21	1:3-5
353	2	Oboegaki	C13	1:7
390	3	Oboechō	20	16:2
190	4	Oboechō	23	23:3-4
389	5	Oboechō	26	22:3
72	6	Oboechō	C24	25:1-3
361	7	Oboechō	C27	15:2
226	8	I	Hatoya Koichi	4
17	9	I	Ichimura Mitsugorō 1	3:1
93	10	I	Ichimura Mitsugorō 1	10:1
113	11	I	Ichimura Mitsugorō 1	11
346	12	I	Ichimura Mitsugorō 1	17
94	13	I	Ichimura Mitsugorō 1	20:1
181	14	I	Ichimura Mitsugorō 1	27:1
102	15	I	Ichimura Mitsugorō 1	28:1
27	16	I	Ichimura Mitsugorō 1	30
207	17	I	Ichimura Mitsugorō 1	35:1-2
342	18	I	Ichimura Mitsugorō 1	40:3
111	19	I	Ichimura Mitsugorō 1	44:1
48	20	I	Ichimura Mitsugorō 2	8
110	21	I	Ichimura Mitsugorō 2	9
79	22	I	Ichimura Mitsugorō 2	13:1
153	23	I	Ichimura Mitsugorō 2	28
149	24	I	Ichimura Mitsugorō 2	31:1-3
82	25	I	Ichimura Mitsugorō 2	33:1-2
321	26	I	Ichimura Mitsugorō 2	43
334	27	I	Ichimura Mitsugorō 2	55
347	28	I	Ichimura Mitsugorō 3	24
1	29	I	Ishihara Ginzō	1
89	30	I	Ishihara Ginzō	3
267	31	I	Kanbara Yaematsu	1
230	32	I	Kondō Fujimori	4
13	33	I	Kondō Fujimori	9
36	34	I	Kondō Fujimori	10
229	35	I	Kondō Fujimori	11
193	36	I	Kondō Fujimori	16:1-2
189	37	I	Kondō Fujimori	26
307	38	I	Kondō Fujimori	30
327	39	I	Kondō Fujimori	40
296	40	I	Kondō Fujimori	43:1-3
277	41	I	Kondō Fujimori	46
376	42	I	Kondō Fujimori	61
92	43	I	Kondō Fujimori	66:1
394	44	I	Kondō Fujimori	80
225	45	I	Ogihara Sugi	3:5, 7-9
372	46	I	Ogihara Sugi	6:5-7
223	47	I	Ogihara Sugi	17
237	48	I	Ogihara Sugi	18
258	49	I	Ogihara Sugi	19
340	50	I	Ogihara Sugi	25
216	51	I	Ogihara Sugi	27
231	52	I	Ogihara Sugi	35
283	53	I	Saito Sojiro	9:2-3
300	54	I	Saito Sojiro	17
249	55	I	Saito Sojiro	18:1-2
338	56	I	Saito Sojiro	26:1
139	57	I	Satō Norio	4:4
206	58	I	Satō Norio	15
208	59	I	Satō Norio	20
55	60	I	Satō Norio	21:20-21
14	61	I	Shimamura Hachitarō	1
20	62	I	Shimamura Hachitarō	2
123	63	I	Shimamura Hachitarō	5
158	64	I	Shimamura Hachitarō	7:1-2
370	65	I	Shimamura Hachitarō	10
359	66	I	Shimamura Hachitarō	11
302	67	I	Shimamura Hachitarō	20
133	68	I	Shimamura Hachitarō	21
322	69	I	Shimamura Hachitarō	22
116	70	I	Shimamura Hachitarō	25
117	71	I	Shimamura Hachitarō	29
180	72	I	Shimamura Hachitarō	33
254	73	I	Shimamura Hachitarō	37
103	74	I	Shimamura Hachitarō	39
282	75	I	Shimamura Hachitarō	40
253	76	I	Shimamura Hachitarō	44
60	77	I	Shimamura Hachitarō	45
273	78	I	Tsugawa Haruo	7
44	79	I	Yamamoto Sadajirō	2:6
23	80	I	Yamamoto Sadajirō	3:1-2
43	81	I	Yamamoto Sadajirō	4
25	82	I	Yamamoto Sadajirō	5:1-3
47	83	I	Yamamoto Sadajirō	19
46	84	I	Yamamoto Sadajirō	21:1-3
325	85	I	Yamamoto Sadajirō	21:4
318	86	I	Yamamoto Sadajirō	22:5
303	87	I	Yamamoto Sadajirō	28
316	88	I	Yamamoto Sadajirō	31:3-4
331	89	I	Yamamoto Sadajirō	35:1-2
387	90	I	Yamamoto Sadajirō	36:1-5
240	91	I	Yamamoto Sadajirō	38:1-2
294	92	I	Yamamoto Sadajirō	41:1
355	93	I	Yamamoto Sadajirō	48:3
386	94	I	Yamamoto Sadajirō	49
106	95	I	Yamamoto Sadajirō	53:2-3
205	96	I	Yamamoto Sadajirō	56:2
224	97	I	Yamamoto Sadajirō	57:4
335	98	I	Yamamoto Sadajirō	59:1-3
125	99	I	Yamamoto Sadajirō	61
308	100	I	Yamamoto Sadajirō	61:6
200	101	I	Yamamoto Sadajirō	62
191	102	I	Yamamoto Sadajirō	64:3
49	103	I	Yamamoto Sadajirō	65:1-3
297	104	I	Yamamoto Sadajirō	66:1-2
151	105	I	Yamamoto Sadajirō	67:2-3
309	106	I	Yamamoto Sadajirō	68
143	107	I	Yoshimoto Kichihyoe	1:4-5
212	108	II	Aizawa Shinano	2
332	109	II	Akiyama Kinoe	1:2-3
74	110	II	Aoi Saki	3
109	111	II	Aoyama Kin’emon	3
64	112	II	Fujii Kiyono	3:1
286	113	II	Fujizawa Zenpei	1:1-3
363	114	II	Fukushima Gihe'e	1:4 & 6
45	115	II	Fukushima Gihe'e	2:2-3
95	116	II	Fukushima Gihe’e	3:1-3
166	117	II	Fukushima Gihe'e	4:1-2
5	118	II	Fukushima Gihe'e	8:1
213	119	II	Fukushima Gihe'e	8:1
201	120	II	Fukushima Gihe'e	8:2
351	121	II	Fukushima Gihe’e	8:3
345	122	II	Fukushima Gihe'e	9:1-2
9	123	II	Fukushima Gihe'e	10
379	124	II	Fukushima Gihe'e	10:4
368	125	II	Fukushima Gihe'e	11:1-2
31	126	II	Fukushima Gihe'e	14:2
233	127	II	Fukushima Gihe'e	18:2
360	128	II	Fukushima Gihe'e	22:1
304	129	II	Furukawa Kono	6
21	130	II	Goka Keishun	5
19	131	II	Goka Keishun	8
210	132	II	Goka Keishun	20:1
317	133	II	Higuchi Shikatarō	4:1-2
167	134	II	Hirano Goroshirō	2:2
381	135	II	Horimoto Rikichi	1
16	136	II	Ichimura Mitsugorō	2:2-3
15	137	II	Ichimura Mitsugorō	2:17:2
37	138	II	Ichimura Mitsugorō	3:1-2
281	139	II	Ishida Tomosuke	3:1
261	140	II	Ishida Tomosuke	11
339	141	II	Ishihara Ginzō	3:1
232	142	II	Ishii Kono	1
263	143	II	Karahi Tsunezō	2
358	144	II	Karahi Tsunezō	4:2
236	145	II	Kashiwabara Toku	4
57	146	II	Kashiwabara Toku	5
288	147	II	Kashiwabara Toku	6
182	148	II	Kashiwabara Toku	8
383	149	II	Kashiwabara Toku	10:2
374	150	II	Kataoka Jirōshirō	3:2
66	151	II	Kataoka Jirōshirō	6
26	152	II	Katsura Matsuhei	1:6
187	153	II	Kobayashi Saisaburō	11
391	154	II	Kobayashi Saisaburō	13
38	155	II	Kōmoto Toratarō	2
257	156	II	Kōmoto Toratarō	3
198	157	II	Kōmoto Toratarō	5
197	158	II	Kōmoto Toratarō	6
262	159	II	Kōmoto Toratarō	9:1
352	160	II	Kondō Fujimori	3:1-5
10	161	II	Kondō Fujimori	6:2
278	162	II	Kondō Fujimori	10
11	163	II	Kondō Fujimori	13:4
8	164	II	Kondō Fujimori	15
30	165	II	Kondō Fujimori	17
203	166	II	Kondō Fujimori	20:1-3
104	167	II	Kondō Fujimori	22
85	168	II	Kondō Fujimori	25
87	169	II	Kondō Fujimori	28
118	170	II	Kondō Fujimori	29
147	171	II	Kondō Fujimori	30
219	172	II	Kondō Fujimori	30
330	173	II	Kondō Fujimori	35:1-3
349	174	II	Kondō Fujimori	48
397	175	II	Kondō Fujimori	53
396	176	II	Kondō Fujimori	54
157	177	II	Kondō Fujimori	57
68	178	II	Kondō Tsuru	1
86	179	II	Konkō Hagio	2
176	180	II	Konkō Hagio	13
400	181	II	Konkō Hagio	21
279	182	II	Konkō Ieyoshi	2
170	183	II	Kunieda Sangorō	1:1-2
329	184	II	Kunieda Sangorō	4
83	185	II	Kunieda Sangorō	5:1-2
395	186	II	Kunieda Sangorō	11
90	187	II	Kunieda Sangorō	12
366	188	II	Kunieda Sangorō	13
137	189	II	Matsumoto Tashichi	1
186	190	II	Mimura Sano	1:2-3
73	191	II	Mimura Sano	2:2
269	192	II	Morimasa Sadano	2
177	193	II	Morimasa Sadano	6:1
155	194	II	Nanba Kō	6
315	195	II	Nanba Kō	7:1-4
241	196	II	Nanba Kō	12
65	197	II	Nanba Kō	13:2-3
142	198	II	Okada Kiku	1
377	199	II	Okamoto Shige	2
159	200	II	Ōkida Kisaburō	3:2
171	201	II	Ōkida Kisaburō	4:2
373	202	II	Ōkida Kisaburō	16:1-2
378	203	II	Ōkida Kisaburō	17
275	204	II	Ōnishi Hide	5:1
276	205	II	Ōnishi Hide	7:1-2
375	206	II	Ōnishi Hide	8:1-2
274	207	II	Ōnishi Hide	9
78	208	II	Ōnishi Hide	15
76	209	II	Oshiki Masu	1:2
356	210	II	Sakane Risaburo	3:3
33	211	II	Satō Mitsujiro	3:1-3
272	212	II	Satō Mitsujiro	5:1-2
40	213	II	Satō Mitsujiro	12
53	214	II	Satō Mitsujiro	14:1-2
18	215	II	Satō Mitsujiro	14:3
202	216	II	Satō Mitsujiro	18:1-2
75	217	II	Satō Mitsujiro	27:1-2
63	218	II	Satō Mitsujiro	28:1-3
59	219	II	Satō Mitsujiro	29:2-4
134	220	II	Satō Mitsujiro	30:1-2
54	221	II	Satō Norio	4:3-5
204	222	II	Satō Norio	12
354	223	II	Satō Norio	14:3
174	224	II	Satō Teru	1:3
369	225	II	Senda Shima	3:1-3
156	226	II	Shiota Mohachi	2
341	227	II	Shiota Mohachi	3
365	228	II	Shirakami Shin'ichirō	1
287	229	II	Shiwaku Kiyo	2
251	230	II	Sunami Sanokichi	4
114	231	II	Sunami Sanokichi	8:1
168	232	II	Takahashi Tomie	15:1
392	233	II	Takahashi Tomie	26
246	234	II	Takahashi Tomie	30
209	235	II	Takahashi Tomie	33
311	236	II	Takahashi Tomie	47:1-2
398	237	II	Teramasa Yasube'e	1:2
150	238	II	Tomita Tomi	1:1-3
188	239	II	Torigoe Shirōkichi	1
56	240	II	Toshimori Shino	1
371	241	II	Tsugawa Haruo	1:3
336	242	II	Tsugawa Haruo	3
175	243	II	Tsugawa Haruo	6:1-2
248	244	II	Tsugawa Haruo	9:1-3
148	245	II	Tsugawa Haruo	10:3
239	246	II	Tsugawa Haruo	12:1-3
130	247	II	Tsugawa Haruo	14
265	248	II	Tsugawa Haruo	16:1-2
255	249	II	Tsugawa Haruo	17:1-4
259	250	II	Tsugawa Haruo	18:1
260	251	II	Tsugawa Haruo	18:3
238	252	II	Yamamoto Sadajirō	1:11
22	253	II	Yamamoto Sadajirō	3
319	254	II	Yamamoto Sadajirō	4:1-2
24	255	II	Yamamoto Sadajirō	5:1-2
380	256	II	Yamamoto Sadajirō	6:6-7
310	257	II	Yamamoto Sadajirō	7:1-3
67	258	II	Yamamoto Sadajirō	9:1-2
195	259	II	Yoshihara Ryōzō	1:2-5
178	260	II	Unknown	2:1-2
357	261	II	Unknown	7
62	262	II	Unknown	10
289	263	II	Unknown	22
183	264	II	Unknown	23
348	265	II	Unknown	24
61	266	III	Omichi Annai	22:2
344	267	III	Kyōso Gorikai	15:1
71	268	III	Kyōso Gorikai	22
127	269	III	Kyōso Gorikai	30
227	270	III	Shinkun	1:4
4	271	III	Shinkun	1:5
165	272	III	Shinkun	1:6
199	273	III	Shinkun	1:8
290	274	III	Shinkun	1:13
228	275	III	Shinkun	1:19
42	276	III	Shinkun	1:33
41	277	III	Shinkun	2:2
128	278	III	Shinkun	2:3
138	279	III	Shinkun	2:4
115	280	III	Shinkun	2:7
107	281	III	Shinkun	2:8
266	282	III	Shinkun	2:11
108	283	III	Shinkun	2:12
295	284	III	Shinkun	2:13
293	285	III	Shinkun	2:14
291	286	III	Shinkun	2:15
323	287	III	Shinkun	2:16-17
243	288	III	Shinkun	2:18
51	289	III	Shinkun	2:19
105	290	III	Shinkun	2:21
80	291	III	Shinkun	2:24
6	292	III	Shinkun	2:30
343	293	III	Shinkun	2:36
314	294	III	Shinkun	2:38
50	295	III	Shinkun	2:42
252	296	III	Shinkun	2:46
12	297	III	Shinkun	2:49
399	298	III	Shinkun	2:50
70	299	III	Konkō Kyōso Gorikai	3:1
222	300	III	Konkō Kyōso Gorikai	5:1-2
7	301	III	Konkō Kyōso Gorikai	6
3	302	III	Konkō Kyōso Gorikai	7:1-2
34	303	III	Konkō Kyōso Gorikai	8
194	304	III	Konkō Kyōso Gorikai	15
362	305	III	Konkō Kyōso Gorikai	18
81	306	III	Konkō Kyōso Gorikai	20:1-2
96	307	III	Konkō Kyōso Gorikai	23
91	308	III	Konkō Kyōso Gorikai	26:2
99	309	III	Konkō Kyōso Gorikai	26
256	310	III	Konkō Kyōso Gorikai	29
122	311	III	Konkō Kyōso Gorikai	30
196	312	III	Konkō Kyōso Gorikai	33
161	313	III	Konkō Kyōso Gorikai	34:1-2
100	314	III	Konkō Kyōso Gorikai	35
101	315	III	Konkō Kyōso Gorikai	37
163	316	III	Konkō Kyōso Gorikai	41
179	317	III	Konkō Kyōso Gorikai	43
69	318	III	Konkō Kyōso Gorikai	44
270	319	III	Konkō Kyōso Gorikai	45:2-3
324	320	III	Konkō Kyōso Gorikai	46
333	321	III	Konkō Kyōso Gorikai	47
235	322	III	Konkō Kyōso Gorikai	48
172	323	III	Konkō Kyōso Gorikai	51
242	324	III	Konkō Kyōso Gorikai	52
141	325	III	Konkō Kyōso Gorikai	54
121	326	III	Konkō Kyōso Gorikai	55
367	327	III	Konkō Kyōso Gorikai	61:1-3
119	328	III	Konkō Kyōso Gorikai	62:2
140	329	III	Konkō Kyōso Gorikai	64
98	330	III	Konkō Kyōso Gorikai	67
144	331	III	Konkō Kyōso Gorikai	68:1
169	332	III	Konkō Kyōso Gorikai	68:2
97	333	III	Konkō Kyōso Gorikai	69:1-2
52	334	III	Konkō Kyōso Gorikai	72
135	335	III	Konkō Kyōso Gorikai	78:1-3
305	336	III	Konkō Kyōso Gorikai	80:1
285	337	III	Konkō Kyōso Gorikai	83:1-2
271	338	III	Konkō Kyōso Gorikai	84
393	339	III	Konkō Kyōso Gorikai	96:1-2
364	340	III	Konkō Kyōso Gorikai	99
136	341	III	Konkō Kyōso Gorikai	100
388	342	III	Gorikai Shūi	13:1-2
299	343	III	Gorikai Shūi	18
350	344	III	Gorikai Shūi	24
250	345	III	Jinkyūkyōgoroku	2:1-2
32	346	III	Jinkyūkyōgoroku	4
29	347	III	Jinkyūkyōgoroku	5
112	348	III	Jinkyūkyōgoroku	8
244	349	III	Jinkyūkyōgoroku	10
28	350	III	Jinkyūkyōgoroku	12
215	351	III	Jinkyūkyōgoroku	17
234	352	III	Jinkyūkyōgoroku	19:1
132	353	III	Jinkyūkyōgoroku	21
58	354	III	Jinkyūkyōgoroku	23:1-3
313	355	III	Jinkyūkyōgoroku	24:1-2
384	356	III	Jinkyūkyōgoroku	26
280	357	III	Jinkyūkyōgoroku	28
145	358	III	Jinkyūkyōgoroku	29
162	359	III	Jinkyūkyōgoroku	30:2
146	360	III	Jinkyūkyōgoroku	31:1-2
247	361	III	Jinkyūkyōgoroku	32:2-3
39	362	III	Jinkyūkyōgoroku	32
326	363	III	Jinkyūkyōgoroku	34
131	364	III	Jinkyūkyōgoroku	35:1-2
245	365	III	Jinkyūkyōgoroku	42
220	366	III	Jinkyūkyōgoroku	49:1-2
126	367	III	Jinkyūkyōgoroku	51
154	368	III	Jinkyūkyōgoroku	56:1-2
312	369	III	Jinkyūkyōgoroku	63:1-2
88	370	III	Jinkyūkyōgoroku	74
84	371	III	Jinkyūkyōgoroku	79:1-3
306	372	III	Jinkyūkyōgoroku	84:3
184	373	III	Jinkyūkyōgoroku	89
129	374	III	Jinkyūkyōgoroku	90:1-2
185	375	III	Jinkyūkyōgoroku	92:1-2
292	376	III	Jinkyūkyōgoroku	100:1-2
2	377	III	Jinkyūkyōgoroku	104
124	378	III	Jinkyūkyōgoroku	105:1-2
337	379	III	Jinkyūkyōgoroku	116:3
218	380	III	Jinkyūkyōgoroku	122
214	381	III	Jinkyūkyōgoroku	135:1-2
211	382	III	Jinkyūkyōgoroku	150
164	383	III	Jinkyūkyōgoroku	151
77	384	III	Jinkyūkyōgoroku	152
152	385	III	Jinkyūkyōgoroku	155
120	386	III	Jinkyūkyōgoroku	156
35	387	III	Jinkyūkyōgoroku	163
320	388	III	Jinkyūkyōgoroku	164
173	389	III	Jinkyūkyōgoroku	167:1-2
385	390	III	Jinkyūkyōgoroku	168
284	391	III	Jinkyūkyōgoroku	170:1-2
328	392	III	Jinkyūkyōgoroku	171:1-2
268	393	III	Jinkyūkyōgoroku	184
217	394	III	Jinkyūkyōgoroku	185
264	395	III	Jinkyūkyōgoroku	191:3-5
221	396	III	Jinkyūkyōgoroku	198:1-2
301	397	III	Jinkyūkyōgoroku	201
192	398	III	Naiden	2:2
160	399	III	Naiden	6:6
382	400	III	Naiden	6:8
