= Yakudoshi =

Ages traditionally considered unlucky in Japan

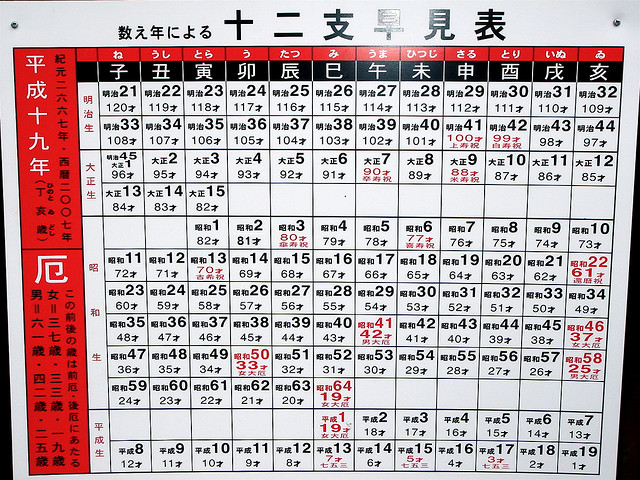
Table of bad luck years

Yakudoshi (厄年), or "calamitous years," are ages that in Japan are traditionally believed to be unlucky.

== Unlucky years ==
The ages most often considered unlucky in Japan are 25, 42, and 61 for men, and 19, 33, and 37 for women, though there is much regional variation. Note that yakudoshi are calculated by traditional age reckoning in Japan, according to which children are considered to be one year old at birth, and add to their age every New Year's Day. In some communities, the sixty-first year, which was traditionally the year for retirement, has been held to be lucky rather than unlucky. Among the unlucky years, the most unlucky are thought to be the ages of 42 for men and 33 for women, which are known as daiyakudoshi, or "great-calamity years." The year preceding a yakudoshi year, called a maeyaku (前厄) year, is also considered dangerous, as is the year following one, called atoyaku.

Although yakudoshi is a folk belief, it is shared even by many sophisticated urban Japanese, though the anthropologist David C. Lewis noted in a 1998 study that "Even if a person does visit a shrine or buy a charm on account of social pressures, some inner scepticism about the 'truth' of the yakudoshi beliefs might remain." The superstition is taken very seriously, for example, by the high-status family at the heart of Tanizaki's novel The Makioka Sisters.

Different historical sources specify different ages as yakudoshi. For example, the Iroha Jiruishō, a Japanese dictionary from the Heian period (12th century), states that the years 13, 25, 37, 49, 61, 73, 85, 97 are unlucky. On the other hand, the Shūgaishō (拾芥抄), from the Kamakura period, states that 13, 25, 37, 49, 61, 73, and 99 are yakudoshi. The 16th-century source Kanei (寛永) states that 13, 25, 37, 49, 61, 85, and 99 are the yakudoshi numbers. And in Buddhist teachings, meanwhile, 7, 13, 33, 37, 42, 49, 52, 61, 73, 85, 97, and 105 are considered to be unlucky.

== Remedies ==
To ward off the misfortunes believed to occur during a yakudoshi, individuals may engage in prayer to Shinto or Buddhist deities, attend rituals, purchase protective charms, make pilgrimages, exchange gifts, or hold special festivities, usually at the beginning or end of the year. An anthropologist reported in 1955 that to send away the danger associated with a yakudoshi, individuals sometimes abandoned a personal item such as a comb or a writing brush at a crossroads, and that in one region, men wore underwear in the lucky color of red during their forty-second year.

A yakudoshi festival is held annually at Hachiman shrines in the Kansai region of Japan on January 18 and 19. During the two-day period, people entering either a maeyaku or yakudoshi year attend the shrine to undergo a harae ritual called yakubarai (厄払い). The ceremony involves a priest reciting a prayer whilst waving a haraegushi above the person in order to ward off the unlucky spirits. People also purchase items to display in their home or carry on their person to protect them during the year.

== Origins ==
Some elements of yakudoshi beliefs probably stem from the Chinese-derived astrological system known as Onmyōdō, though yakudoshi practice today is more closely associated with Shinto institutions. Several scholars find it suggestive, for example, that the Chinese lunar-solar calendar runs on a sixty-year cycle, so that in one's unlucky sixty-first year, one is at the same point in the cycle as in the year of one's birth. The yakudoshi superstitions may also be related to indigenous traditional Japanese beliefs regarding ritual purification and affinity by age. In some rural communities, it was thought necessary to avoid exchange yakudoshi gifts with, or attending the yakudoshi festivities of, one's age-mates during an unlucky year.

Many Japanese believe that the bad luck associated with some ages derives from puns that it is possible to make with their numerals. The numeral 33, for example, can be pronounced sanzan, which may mean either "troublesome" or "birth difficulty," the numeral 42 can be pronounced shi ni, meaning "to death," and the number 19 can be pronounced jū ku, meaning "intense suffering." In 1955, the anthropologist Edward Norbeck dismissed such explanations as folk etymology, arguing that when yakudoshi practices first arose, literacy was not widespread enough for homonyms to have caused them, but in 1998, another scholar, David C. Lewis, suggested that such puns involve only simple Chinese characters for numbers and could indeed have been widely known even in early periods. The term yakudoshi may also carry a second, more positive connotation. Those entering such a year are traditionally encouraged to undergo a period of purification and ritual seclusion (monoimi, saikai) and to take on active Shinto duties, such as carrying a shrine's portable palanquin (mikoshi) or joining its parishioners' guild (miyaza), a usage reflecting the alternate reading of yaku as "duty" or "office," rather than solely "misfortune." In modern times, however, this original sense of yakudoshi as an age of assumed responsibility has largely faded, leaving the association with taboo and misfortune dominant.

When asked about yakudoshi, Japanese sometimes say that they mark the boundaries of significant life-stages or that they mark significant moments of change in the human body.
