= Yoshinobu Miyake (religionist) =

Japanese Shinto priest and scholar (born 1958)

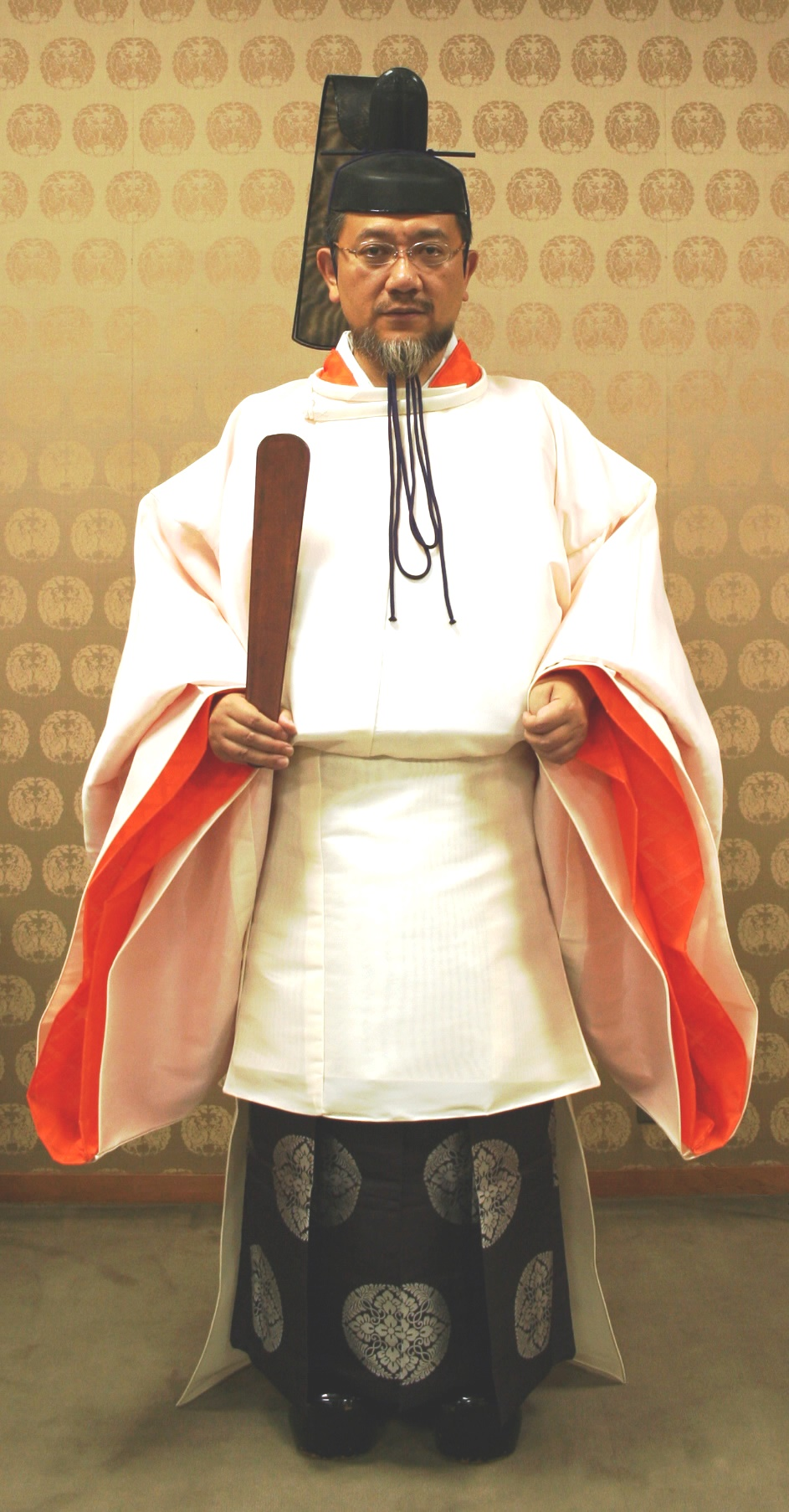
- Born: 24 July 1958 (age 67); Osaka, Japan
- Relatives: Most Rev. Toshio Miyake (grandfather)

Yoshinobu Miyake (jp:三宅善信 Miyake Yoshinobu, born July 27, 1958) is a Japanese Shinto priest and scholar. Rev. Miyake was appointed the Superior General of Konko Church of Izuo in 2006 and appointed chair of the Board of International Shinto Studies Association in 2013.

== Personal background and the Miyake family ==
Born in Osaka, Rev. Yoshinobu Miyake worked as a Shinto priest after graduating from Divinity School of Doshisha University, Konko Theological Seminary, and Center for the Study of World Religions at Harvard University.

As a scholar, he belongs to the Japanese Association for Religious Studies, the International Shinto Studies Association, and the Conference on Religion and Modern Society.

He has received honorary doctorates from Meadville Lombard Theological School, Chicago, and Wonkwang University, Korea.

=== Most Rev. Toshio Miyake ===
His grandfather Most Rev. Toshio Miyake (1903–1999) was Founder of the Konko Church of Izuo and established many interfaith organizations such as Religions for Peace (RfP) and the International Religious Fellowship, and humanitarian aid programs such as the Asian Youth Centre (AYC) of the World Federalist Movement, and Miyake Homes & Schools (MHS) in South Asian countries. He was vice president of the World Constitution and Parliament Association (WCPA).

== Interfaith activities ==
In 1998 he established the “RELNET” website which delivers information on religions.

He has held UN-related positions for groups such as the International Association for Religious Freedom, Religions for Peace and Japan UN Association.

He served as General Secretary of the G8 Religious Leaders Summit and the International Religious Fellowship.

He gave a speech at the plenary session of the 3rd World Summit focused on “Religious Voices for Peace and Development” which took place on August 29, 2015, in Seoul. He also gave a speech at the para session of G20 Interfaith Summit 2015 which took place on 16–18 November 2015 in Istanbul, Turkey.

His work in interfaith dialogue began after he met with Pope Paul VI in 1977. He has since met many times with successive Popes and the Dalai Lama XIV and attended interfaith conferences around the world.

== Publishing ==
- The Living of Peace (1991, Heiwa Publishing)
- Mojibakeshita Rekishiwo Yomitoku (2006, Bun'en-sha)
- Gendaino Shito Homuriwo Kangaeru (2014, Minerva-shobo)
- KAZAMIDORI: How Humanity Has Confronted Infectious Diseases (2019, Shuko-sha)
- Interfaith Worship And Prayer: We Must Pray Together (2019, Jessica Kingsley Publishers)
- Islamic State and Japan: What is the Nation (2019, Shuko-sha)
- Shinto DNA: How Much Do We Know About Japan (2020, Shuko-sha)
- Epidemics and Ritual Practice in Japan (2021, Pro Universitaria)
- Religion and Technology (2024, JUSUR)
- Continued Moral Pressure for Responsible Globalization (2025, Brill)
- AI and Humans: On the Responsibility of Knowledge (2026, Shuko-sha)
- Monsters Re-Visited: The Fantastic Creatures of Japan (2026, Pro Universitaria)
- Studies in Christianity Vol.88, No1 (2026, School of Theology Doshisha University)
